= William Bonac =

Ghanaian-Dutch professional bodybuilder (born 1982)

- Professional bodybuilder
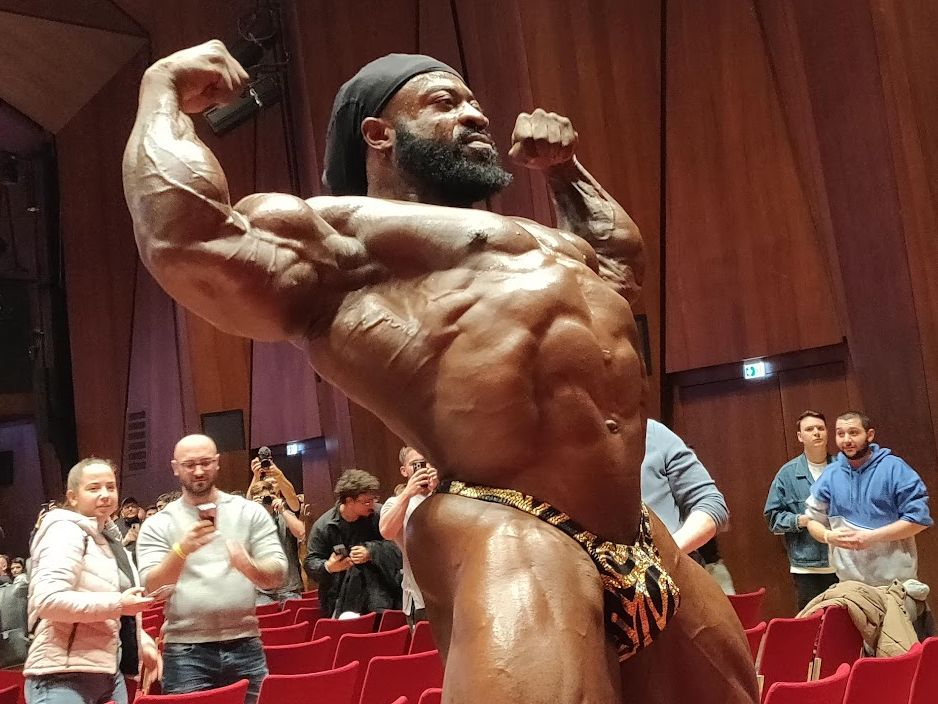
- Bonac in 2022

Personal info
- Nickname: The Conqueror
- Born: 18 May 1982 (age 44); Ghana

Best statistics

Professional (Pro) career
- Pro-debut: British Grand Prix; 2012
- Best win: Arnold Classic; 2018, 2020

William Bonac (born 18 May 1982) is a Ghanaian-Dutch professional bodybuilder who competes in the men's open bodybuilding division in the IFBB Pro League. He is a two-time winner of the Arnold Classic, having won the competition in 2018 and 2020, and was runner-up at the 2019 Mr. Olympia.

== Biography ==
William Bonac was born in Ghana on May 18, 1982, and spent his early childhood there before later living in the Netherlands. He began weight training at the age of 13. Bonac later competed as an amateur bodybuilder and placed third in the heavyweight division at the 2011 Arnold Amateur.

Bonac made his professional debut in 2012, competing in the 212-pound division at the British Grand Prix and Europa Supershow before moving into the Men's Open division. He recorded his first professional victories in the middle of the decade, including wins at the Golden State Pro in 2014 and the Nordic Pro in 2015 and 2016. Bonac made his Mr. Olympia debut in 2014, finishing 15th. He improved to eighth in 2015, fifth in 2016 and third at the 2017 Mr. Olympia.

In 2018, Bonac won the Arnold Classic in Columbus, Ohio, his first victory at the competition. He finished fourth at the 2018 Mr. Olympia. In 2019, he placed second at the Arnold Classic and won the Arnold Classic Australia. Later that year, Bonac finished second to Brandon Curry at the 2019 Mr. Olympia, the highest Olympia placing of his career. Bonac won the Arnold Classic for a second time in 2020 and later placed fifth at the 2020 Mr. Olympia.

Bonac finished sixth at the 2021 Mr. Olympia. In 2022, he placed second at the Arnold Classic and won the Boston Pro before finishing ninth at the 2022 Mr. Olympia. He did not compete at the 2023 Mr. Olympia. Bonac returned to the Olympia stage in 2024 after winning the Empro Pro and placed seventh at the 2024 Mr. Olympia. In 2025, he placed fifth at the Arnold Classic, won the Detroit Pro, finished fourth at the Pittsburgh Pro and second at both the New York Pro and Dubai Pro. He later placed ninth at the 2025 Mr. Olympia.

In 2026, Bonac won the Tsunami Nutrition Showdown Pro and the Empro Classic Spain Pro, qualifying for the 2026 Mr. Olympia. Ahead of the 2026 Mr. Olympia, Bonac stated that the competition would be his final appearance at the Olympia and that he planned to conclude his competitive career following further appearances at the Arnold Classic.

== Competitive history ==
- 2011 Arnold Amateur – 3rd (Heavyweight)
- 2012 British Grand Prix – 6th (212 lb)
- 2012 Europa Supershow – 3rd (212 lb)
- 2012 EVLS Prague Pro – 4th (212 lb)
- 2013 EVLS Prague Pro – 5th (Men's Open)
- 2014 Australia Pro Grand Prix – 2nd (Men's Open)
- 2014 Arnold Classic Brazil – 7th (Men's Open)
- 2014 Golden State Pro – 1st (Men's Open)
- 2014 Tampa Pro – 2nd (Men's Open)
- 2014 Mr. Olympia – 15th (Men's Open)
- 2014 Arnold Classic Europe – 6th (Men's Open)
- 2014 EVLS Prague Pro – 8th (Men's Open)
- 2014 San Marino Pro – 11th (Men's Open)
- 2015 Nordic Pro – 1st (Men's Open)
- 2015 Mr. Olympia – 8th (Men's Open)
- 2015 Arnold Classic Europe – 6th (Men's Open)
- 2015 EVLS Prague Pro – 5th (Men's Open)
- 2015 Dayana Cadeau Classic – 1st (Men's Open)
- 2015 San Marino Pro – 2nd (Men's Open)
- 2016 Mr. Olympia – 5th (Men's Open)
- 2016 Arnold Classic Europe – 3rd (Men's Open)
- 2016 Nordic Pro – 1st (Men's Open)
- 2016 EVLS Prague Pro – 1st (Men's Open)
- 2016 Kuwait Pro – 5th (Men's Open)
- 2016 Olympia Europe – 3rd (Men's Open)
- 2017 Mr. Olympia – 3rd (Men's Open)
- 2017 Arnold Classic Europe – 2nd (Men's Open)
- 2017 EVLS Prague Pro – 2nd (Men's Open)
- 2018 Arnold Classic – 1st (Men's Open)
- 2018 Arnold Classic Australia – 2nd (Men's Open)
- 2018 Mr. Olympia – 4th (Men's Open)
- 2019 Arnold Classic – 2nd (Men's Open)
- 2019 Arnold Classic Australia – 1st (Men's Open)
- 2019 Mr. Olympia – 2nd (Men's Open)
- 2020 Arnold Classic – 1st (Men's Open)
- 2020 Mr. Olympia – 5th (Men's Open)
- 2021 Mr. Olympia – 6th (Men's Open)
- 2022 Arnold Classic – 2nd (Men's Open)
- 2022 Boston Pro – 1st (Men's Open)
- 2022 Mr. Olympia – 9th (Men's Open)
- 2024 Empro Pro – 1st (Men's Open)
- 2024 Mr. Big Evolution Portugal Pro – 2nd (Men's Open)
- 2024 Dubai Pro – 2nd (Men's Open)
- 2024 Mr. Olympia – 7th (Men's Open)
- 2025 Arnold Classic – 5th (Men's Open)
- 2025 Detroit Pro – 1st (Men's Open)
- 2025 Pittsburgh Pro – 4th (Men's Open)
- 2025 New York Pro – 2nd (Men's Open)
- 2025 Dubai Pro – 2nd (Men's Open)
- 2025 Mr. Olympia – 9th (Men's Open)
- 2026 Tsunami Nutrition Showdown Pro – 1st (Men's Open)
- 2026 Empro Classic Spain Pro – 1st (Men's Open)
- 2026 FLEX Weekend Italy Pro – 2nd (Men's Open)

Preceded by Cedric McMillan	Arnold Classic; 2018	Succeeded by Brandon Curry
Preceded by Brandon Curry	Arnold Classic; 2020	Succeeded by Nick Walker
