= Derek Lunsford =

American professional bodybuilder (born 1993)

- Professional bodybuilder
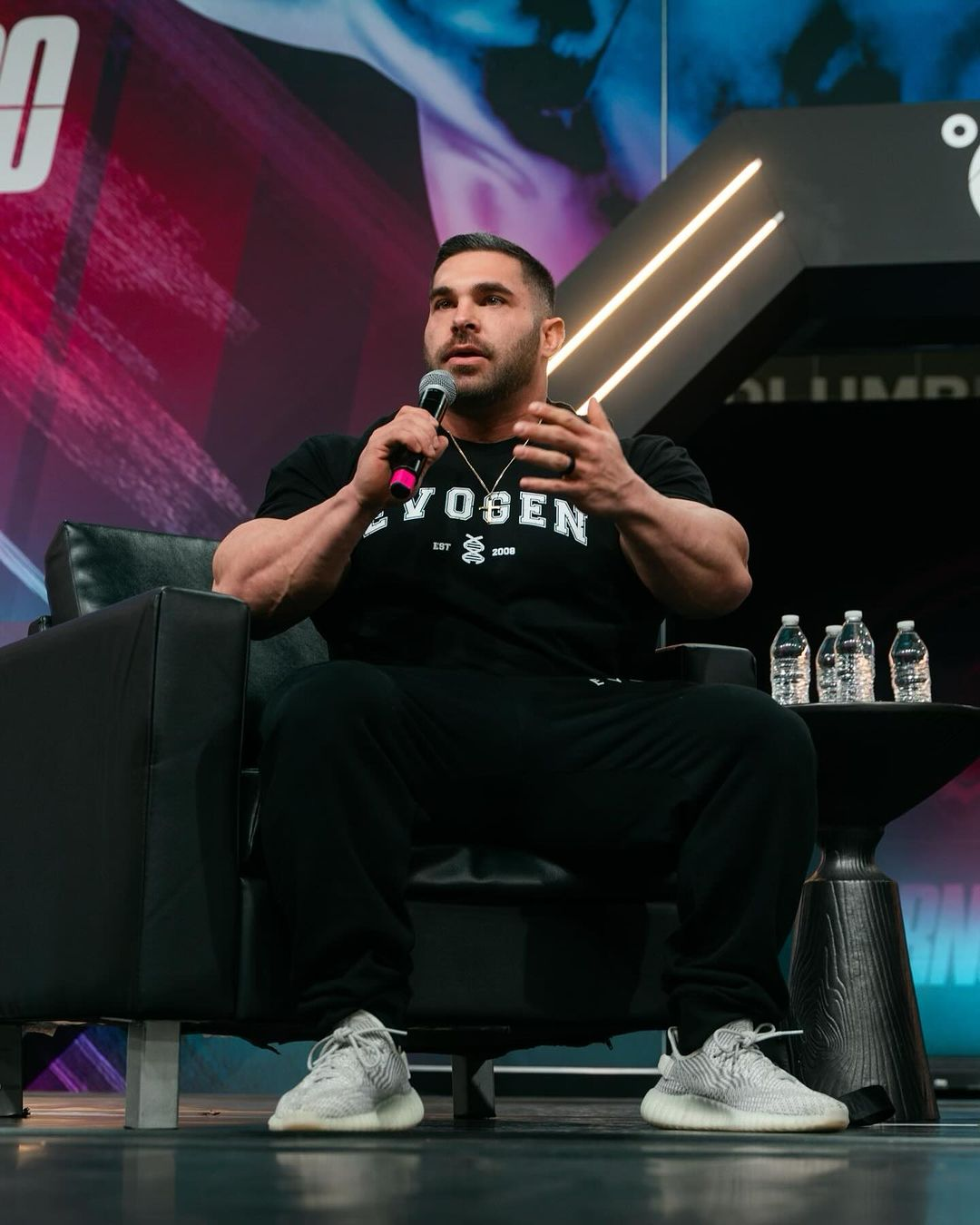
- Lunsford at the Arnold Classic, 2024

Personal info
- Born: May 14, 1993 (age 33); Petersburg, Indiana, U.S.

Best statistics
- Height: 5 ft 6 in (1.68 m)
- Weight: Contest: 225 lb (102 kg); Off season: 240 lb (109 kg)

Professional (Pro) career
- Pro-debut: IFBB Tampa Pro; 2017
- Best win: IFBB Mr. Olympia; 2023, 2025
- Predecessor: Hadi Choopan (2022), Samson Dauda (2024)
- Successor: Samson Dauda (2024), Nick Walker (2026)
Medal record
Men's bodybuilding
IFBB Mr. Olympia
2nd	2018 Mr. Olympia	Men's 212
2nd	2019 Mr. Olympia	Men's 212
4th	2020 Mr. Olympia	Men's 212
1st	2021 Mr. Olympia	Men's 212
2nd	2022 Mr. Olympia	Men's Open
1st	2023 Mr. Olympia	Men's Open
3rd	2024 Mr. Olympia	Men's Open
1st	2025 Mr. Olympia	Men's Open
3rd	2026 Mr. Olympia	Men's Open
Other IFBB Pro contests
1st	2017 Tampa Pro	Men's 212
1st	2025 Arnold Classic US	Men's Open
1st	2025 Pittsburgh Pro	Men's Open

Derek Lunsford (born May 14, 1993) is an American professional bodybuilder who competes in the men's open bodybuilding division in the IFBB Pro League. He won the 212 Olympia title in 2021 and the Men's Open Mr. Olympia title in 2023 and 2025, becoming the first competitor to win the Mr. Olympia in two divisions.

== Biography ==
Derek Lunsford was born in Petersburg, Indiana on May 14, 1993. He was an active child who participated in various sports, including soccer and high school wrestling. Lunsford's interest in bodybuilding began during his college years when he shifted from his earlier sports pursuits to weightlifting. He sought the guidance of a personal trainer, James Brown, to achieve better results.

In 2015, Derek Lunsford made his amateur bodybuilding debut at the NPC Indianapolis Championships, where he competed in the Men's Open Welterweight division and emerged as the winner. He continued to establish himself as a competitive amateur bodybuilder by winning the 2015 and 2016 NPC Junior Nationals. He earned his Pro Card in 2017 NPC USA Championships, marking his transition to professional bodybuilding.

Lunsford made his professional bodybuilding debut at the 2017 IFBB Tampa Pro, competing in the 212 lb division, and won his first professional show. His victory at the Tampa Pro earned him an invitation to the 2017 Mr. Olympia where he took 5th place. Over the years, Derek Lunsford consistently competed in the 212 division of the Mr. Olympia competition and consistently achieved top-5 placements. In March 2021, it was announced that he started training with bodybuilding coach Hany Rambod. In October 2021, he won the 212 Mr. Olympia, overtaking the then-current winner, Shaun Clarida.

In May 2022, Derek Lunsford appeared on IFBB Pittsburgh Pro stage as a guest poser, weighing 257 pounds. In September 2022, it was announced that he received a special invitation to compete in the open division of the 2022 Mr. Olympia. He achieved a second-place finish behind Hadi Choopan in his first attempt competing in the new division. In 2023, Derek Lunsford won both the Mr. Olympia title and the People's Champion Award, becoming the first winner of the competition in two weight divisions: 212 and Open.

In 2024, Lunsford fell to third place at the Mr. Olympia. At the end of the season, his coach, Hany Rambod, announced his retirement. Early in 2025, Lunsford began working with Brazilian trainer Fabrício Pacholok and Chris Aceto.

In March 2025, Lunsford won the Arnold Classic, finishing ahead of Samson Dauda and Andrew Jacked. In May 2025, he won the inaugural Men's Open contest at the Pittsburgh Pro, defeating Nick Walker and Martin Fitzwater. At the 2025 Mr. Olympia, Lunsford reclaimed the Men's Open title, finishing ahead of Hadi Choopan and Andrew Jacked. He became a two-time Men's Open Mr. Olympia champion and the first competitor since Jay Cutler in 2009 to regain the title after losing it the previous year.

Lunsford returned to defend his title at the 2026 Mr. Olympia. He finished third behind runner-up Samson Dauda and winner Nick Walker, who captured his first Mr. Olympia title.

== Competitive history ==
- 2015 NPC Indianapolis Championships – 1st (Welterweight)
- 2015 NPC Junior Nationals – 1st (Welterweight)
- 2016 NPC Junior Nationals – 1st (Middleweight/Overall)
- 2016 NPC USA Championships – 2nd (Middleweight)<https://contests.npcnewsonline.com/contests/2016/npc_usa_championships>
- 2017 NPC USA Championships – 1st (Light Heavyweight)
- 2017 IFBB Tampa Pro – 1st (212 lb)
- 2017 IFBB Mr. Olympia – 5th (212 lb)
- 2018 IFBB Mr. Olympia – 2nd (212 lb)
- 2019 IFBB Mr. Olympia – 2nd (212 lb)
- 2020 IFBB Mr. Olympia – 4th (212 lb)
- 2021 IFBB Mr. Olympia – 1st (212 lb)
- 2022 IFBB Mr. Olympia – 2nd (Men's Open)
- 2023 IFBB Mr. Olympia – 1st (Men's Open)
- 2024 IFBB Mr. Olympia – 3rd (Men's Open)
- 2025 Arnold Classic – 1st (Men's Open)
- 2025 IFBB Pittsburgh Pro – 1st (Men's Open)
- 2025 IFBB Mr. Olympia – 1st (Men's Open)
- 2026 IFBB Mr. Olympia – 3rd (Men's Open)

Preceded by Hadi Choopan	Mr. Olympia; 2023	Succeeded by Samson Dauda

Preceded by Samson Dauda	Mr. Olympia; 2025	Succeeded by Nick Walker

Preceded by Shaun Clarida	212 Mr. Olympia; 2021	Succeeded by Shaun Clarida
