= Ramon Dino =

Brazilian professional bodybuilder

Ramon Queiroz
- ♂ Professional bodybuilder
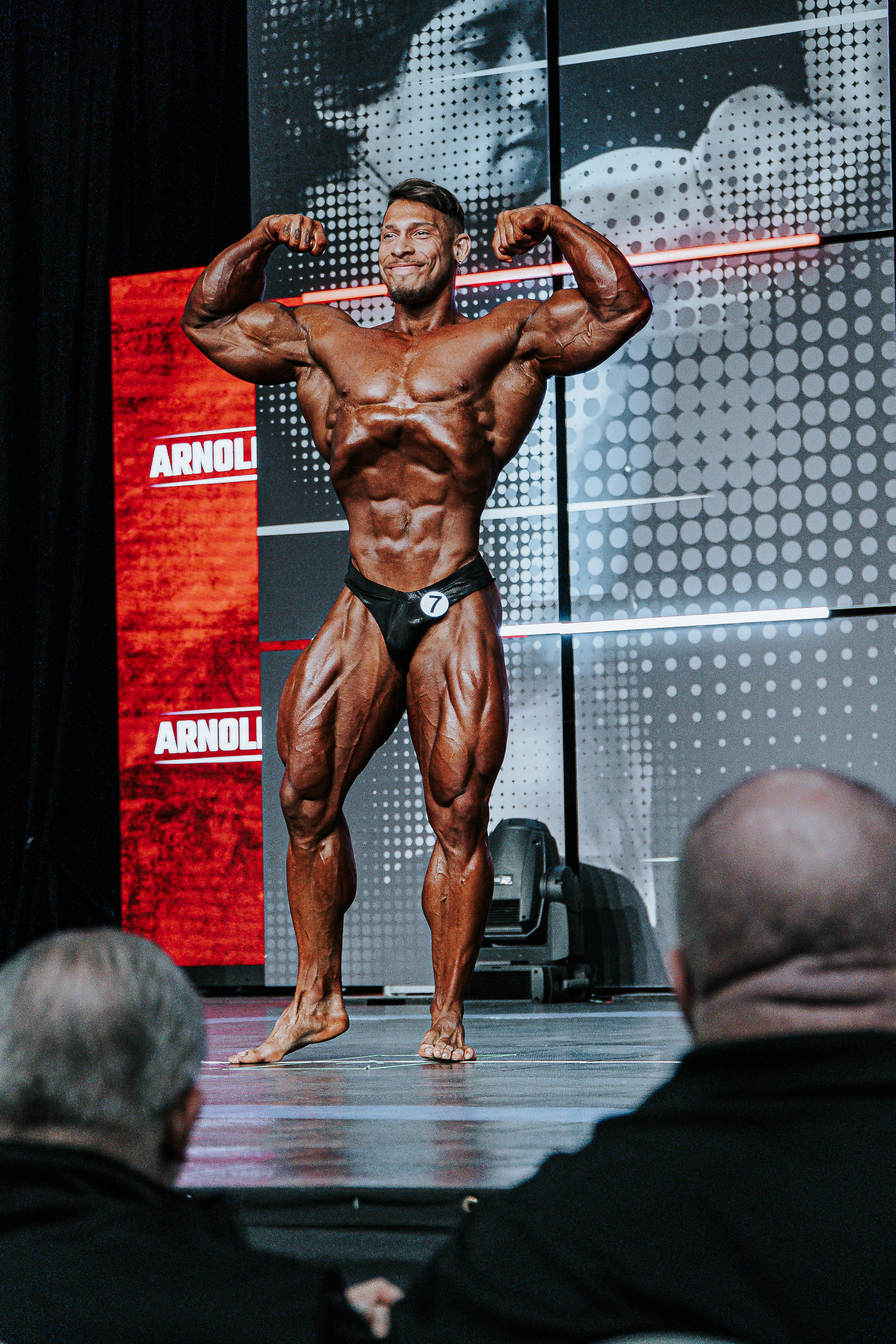
- Dino at the 2022 Arnold Classic

Personal info
- Nickname: Ramon Dino, Dinossauro do Acre
- Born: 9 February 1995 (age 31); Rio Branco, Acre, Brazil

Best statistics
- Height: 5 ft 11 in (1.80 m)
- Weight: Contest: 225 lb (102 kg); Off-season: 260 lb (118 kg)

Professional (Pro) career
- Best win: Mr. Olympia Classic Physique winner; 2025
- Predecessor: Chris "CBum" Bumstead
- Successor: Niall Darwen
- Coach: Fabrício Pacholok; Chris Aceto
Medal record
Men's Bodybuilding
IFBB Mr. Olympia
2nd	2022 Mr. Olympia	Classic Physique
2nd	2023 Mr. Olympia	Classic Physique
1st	2025 Mr. Olympia	Classic Physique
3rd	2026 Mr. Olympia	Classic Physique

Ramon Rocha Queiroz (born 9 February 1995), commonly known as Ramon Dino or "O Dinossauro do Acre" (Dinosaur from Acre), is a Brazilian professional bodybuilder. He is the leading Classic Physique athlete in Brazil and Latin America. His weight limit in his category is 103 kilograms (227 pounds). He became the first Brazilian man to be crowned a Mr. Olympia champion, at the 2025 Edition on Classic Physique category. Another major achievement is his Arnold Classic Ohio title in 2023.

In 2018, Dino competed in Olympia Brasil, one of Brazil's most prestigious bodybuilding competitions. At this event, he earned his Pro Card in the Classic Physique category. In 2021, he made his international debut at the Mr. Olympia, placing fifth. Shortly after, he secured a spot at the 2022 Olympia at the Expo Super Show in Rio de Janeiro.

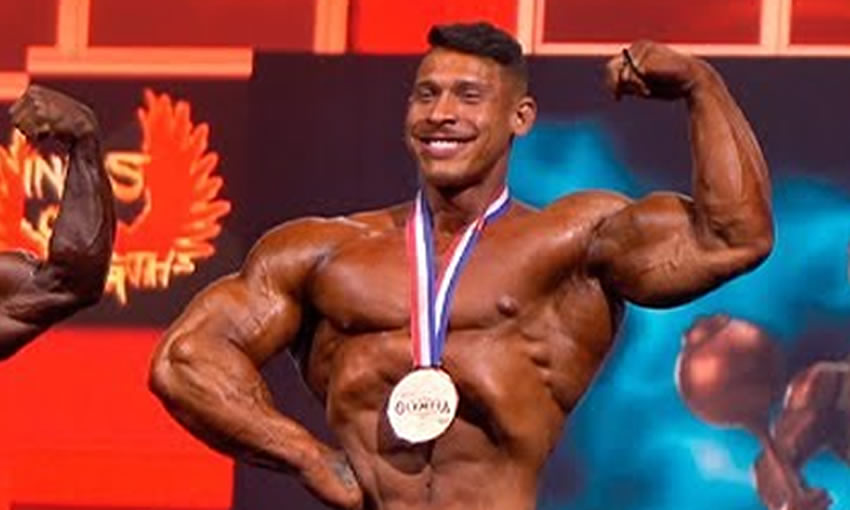
Dino in the 2022 edition of Mr. Olympia, where he placed 2nd.

In December 2022, Dino returned to compete in the Mr. Olympia for his second time. He finished that edition as a runner-up, behind Canadian Chris "CBum" Bumstead who won his fourth title. Four months later, the Brazilian participated in the 2023 Arnold Classic Ohio and earned his first big title at international level.

In November 2023, Dino participated in the 2023 Mr. Olympia and was once again the runner-up in Classic Physique category behind CBum. He competed again in the 2024 Mr. Olympia and placed fourth in the Classic Physique division.

In October 2025, Dino ultimately got his first world champion title at Mr. Olympia, when he surpassed German Mike Sommerfeld and American Terrence Ruffin and won the Men's Classic Physique category.

== Competition history ==
- Regional Championship 2016 Men's Physique – 2nd
- Regional Championship 2017 Men's Physique – 2nd
- 2018 Mr. Olympia Brasil - 1st (earned IFBB Pro Card)
- 2021 Europa Pro - 2nd
- 2021 Mr. Olympia - 5th
- 2021 Muscle Contest Brasil - 1st
- 2022 Arnold Classic - 2nd
- 2022 Mr. Olympia - 2nd
- 2023 Arnold Classic - 1st
- 2023 Mr. Olympia - 2nd
- 2024 Arnold Classic - 2nd
- 2024 Mr. Olympia - 4th
- 2025 Mr. Olympia - 1st
- 2026 Mr. Olympia - 3rd

== Sponsorships ==
- 2020 - 2021: Growth Suplementos
- 2021–Present: Max Titanium
