= 2025 Mr. Olympia =

Bodybuilding competition held in Las Vegas, USA

- Genre: Professional bodybuilding competition
- Begins: October 6, 2025
- Ends: October 12, 2025
- Venue: Resorts World Las Vegas
- Locations: Las Vegas, Nevada
- Country: United States
- Previous event: 2024 Mr. Olympia
- Next event: 2026 Mr. Olympia
- Organizer: IFBB

The 2025 Mr. Olympia contest was an IFBB professional bodybuilding competition and expo held from October 6–12, 2025, at the Resorts World Las Vegas, in Las Vegas, Nevada. It was the 61st Mr. Olympia competition held. Other events at the exhibition included the 2025 212 Olympia Showdown, as well as finals in Men's Classic, Men's Physique, 2025 Ms. Olympia, Fitness, 2025 Figure, 2025 Bikini Olympia, among other contests.

== Venue ==
The venue returned to Las Vegas after switching to Orlando, Florida in 2023. Las Vegas has served as host city for bodybuilding competition since the days of Coleman-Cutler rivalry.

== Results ==
Derek Lunsford won the 61st edition of Mr. Olympia Men's Open competition in 2025, with a prize of $600,000, reclaiming the title he lost in 2024 to Samson Dauda. Hadi Choopan came in second, for the third time in a row, with a prize of $250,000. Ten other winners from multiple divisions were crowned during the two days of division finals, including Ramon Queiroz, who won his first Classic Physique title.

Table key

Winner
Runner-Up
Third place

Place	Prize	Name	Country	Judging	Finals	Total
1	$600,000	Derek Lunsford	United States	6	8	14
2	$250,000	Hadi Choopan	Iran	9	7	16
3	$100,000	Andrew Jacked	Nigeria	17	15	32
4	$40,000	Samson Dauda	United Kingdom	18	20	38
5	$30,000	Martin Fitzwater	United States	26	25	51
6		Nick Walker	United States	29	30	59
7		Brandon Curry	United States	35	35	70
8		Tonio Burton	United States	40	40	80
9		William Bonac	Netherlands	46	46	92
10		Vitalii Ugolnikov	Brazil	48	48	96
11		Behrooz Tabani	Iran	55	58	113
12		Jordan Hutchinson	United States	60	57	117
13		Urs Kalecinski	Germany	69	65	134
14		Regan Grimes	France	75	70	145
15		Rubiel Mosquera	Colombia	70	76	146
16		Sasan Heirati	United Kingdom	78	79	157
16		Chenglong Shen	China	80	80	160
16		Dorian Haywood	United States	80	80	160
16		Akim Williams	United States	80	80	160
16		Brett Wilkin	United States	80	80	160

== 2025 Men’s 212 Olympia Results ==
Keone Pearson entered the weekend as the man to beat in the 212 division after back-to-back victories. In a battle between familiar rivals, Pearson once again came out on top, securing his third straight title. Shaun Clarida finished second for the second consecutive year.

Table key

Winner
Runner-Up
Third place

Place	Prize	Name	Country	Judging	Finals	Total
1	$50,000	Keone Pearson	United States	5		5
2	$20,000	Shaun Clarida	United States	10		10
3	$12,000	Lucas Garcia	Brazil	16		16
4	$7,000	Nihat Kaya	Turkey	19		19
5	$6,000	Courage Opara	United States	27		27
6		Kerrith Bajjo	United States	28		28
7		Francisco Barrios Vlk	Brazil	36		36
8		Vitor Alves Porto De Oliveira	Brazil	40		40
9		Marco Ruz	France	43		43
10		Giuseppe Zagarella	Italy	51		51
11		Luiz Esteves	Brazil	55		55
12		Frankie Mercado	United States	60		60
13		Jose Maria Mete Bueriberi	Spain	64		64
14		Sung Yeop Jang	South Korea	70		70
15		Mazin Al Rahbi	Oman	76		76
16		Radoslav Angelov	Bulgaria	80		80
16		Lucas Coelho	Brazil	80		80
16		Roman Iushchenko	Ukraine	80		80
16		Ching Chieh Lin	Taiwan	80		80
16		Samir Troudi	Sweden	80		80

== 2025 Classic Physique Olympia Results ==
Ramon Dino has been a major player in Classic Physique in recent years, having battled through many intense showdowns with Chris Bumstead. During prejudging, Queiroz emerged as part of a clear top three alongside Mike Sommerfeld and Terrence Ruffin. Sommerfeld finished as the runner-up for the second year in a row.

Table key

Winner
Runner-Up
Third place

Place	Prize	Name	Country	Judging	Finals	Total
1	$100,000	Ramon Rocha Queiroz	Brazil	7		7
2	$40,000	Mike Sommerfeld	Germany	8		8
3	$20,000	Terrence Ruffin	United States	15		15
4	$10,000	Josema Munoz	Spain	20		20
5	$6,000	Niall Darwen	United Kingdom	25		25
6		Diego Galindo	Colombia	30		30
7		Matheus Menegate	Brazil	35		35
8		Michael Daboul	United Arab Emirates	40		40
9		Justin Badurina	United States	45		45
10		Matthew Greggo	United States	50		50
11		Fabian Mayr	Austria	58		58
12		Logan Franklin	United States	59		59
13		Piotr Wojtowicz	Poland	67		67
14		Breon Ansley	United States	68		68
15		Jaehun Park	South Korea	75		75
16		Eric Abelon	United States	80		80
16		Yemi Adefioye	United Kingdom	80		80
16		Kim Angel	Spain	80		80
16		Franklyn Audu	Canada	80		80
16		Alex Cambronero	United States	80		80
16		Yu Bin Chen	Taiwan	80		80
16		Mahmood Al Durrah	Canada	80		80
16		Meysam Esggandari	Iran	80		80
16		Austin Espy	United States	80		80
16		Fanni Fuadi	Indonesia	80		80
16		Sunmeet Gill	India	80		80
16		Fabio Junio	Brazil	80		80
16		Chen Kang	China	80		80
16		Paul Kanu	Sierra Leone	80		80
16		Kyrylo Khadaiev	Ukraine	80		80
16		Eric Wildberger Lisboa	Brazil	80		80
16		Kai Liu	China	80		80
16		Miguel Malimo	Mozambique	80		80
16		Andrea Mammoli	Italy	80		80
16		Horse Marcello	Brazil	80		80
16		Kenny Moreira	Brazil	80		80
16		Richard Nagy	Hungary	80		80
16		Phil Niu	China	80		80
16		Andy Paredes	United States	80		80
16		Seonghun Park	South Korea	80		80
16		German Pastor	Spain	80		80
16		Damien Patrick	United States	80		80
16		Zhivko Petkov	Bulgaria	80		80
16		Luca Reger	Germany	80		80
16		Emanuele Ricotti	Italy	80		80
16		Abdullah Al Sairafi	Kuwait	80		80
16		Jesus Rodriguez Sendra	Spain	80		80
16		Daryn Shirbayev	Kazakhstan	80		80
16		Reiner Stimmler	Germany	80		80
16		Patrick Teutsch	Germany	80		80
16		Kai Wang	China	80		80
16		Kellen Wilson	Canada	80		80
16		Mustafa Yildiz	Turkey	80		80

== 2025 Men’s Physique Olympia Results ==
It was a familiar battle in the Men’s Physique finals on Saturday night between Ryan Terry and Ali Bilal, mirroring last year’s top two finish. This showdown, once again, did not disappoint. Ryan Terry earned his third consecutive Men’s Physique Olympia title with another dominant performance.

Table key

Winner
Runner-Up
Third place

Place	Prize	Name	Country	Judging	Finals	Total
1	$50,000	Ryan Terry	United Kingdom	5		5
2	$20,000	Ali Bilal	Afghanistan	12		12
3	$12,000	Brandon Hendrickson	United States	13		13
4	$7,000	Erin Banks	United States	20		20
5	$6,000	Edvan Palmeira	Brazil	25		25
6		Juxian He	China	30		30
7		Andrei Deiu	Romania	35		35
8		Jeremy Buendia	United States	41		41
9		Corey Morris	United States	46		46
10		Vitor Chaves	Brazil	48		48
11		Emanual Hunter	United States	55		55
12		Benquil Marigny	United States	59		59
13		Mauro Fialho	Spain	65		65
14		Isai Kesek	Indonesia	70		70
15		Carlos Asiedu Ocran	Ghana	75		75
16		Jo Uezato	Japan	78		78
16		Dustin Alvis	United States	80		80
16		Yemi Awoyemi	United Kingdom	80		80
16		Christopher Barr	United States	80		80
16		Diogo Basaglia	Brazil	80		80
16		Dallas Botchway	Ghana	80		80
16		Steven Cao	United States	80		80
16		Alessandro Cavagnola	Italy	80		80
16		Ricardo Cenat	United States	80		80
16		Bong Seok Choi	South Korea	80		80
16		Rhyan Clark	United States	80		80
16		Emerson Costa	Brazil	80		80
16		Emmanuel Costa	Brazil	80		80
16		Riccardo Croci	Italy	80		80
16		Drew Cullen	United States	80		80
16		Aj Ellison	United States	80		80
16		Andre Ferguson	United States	80		80
16		Reuben Glass	United States	80		80
16		Juan Gochez	United States	80		80
16		Felipe Goncalves	Brazil	80		80
16		Guilherme Gualberto	Brazil	80		80
16		Paul Gustave	France	80		80
16		Jason Huynh	United States	80		80
16		Farouq Ishimoto	Japan	80		80
16		Miroslav Juricek	Czech Republic	80		80
16		Mehdi Kabbadj	United States	80		80
16		Shun Kaneko	Japan	80		80
16		Hossein Karimi	Iran	80		80
16		Ozcan Kirant	Turkey	80		80
16		Joseph Haekyum Lee	United States	80		80
16		Yoon Sung Lee	South Korea	80		80
16		Jefferson Lima	Brazil	80		80
16		Vincius Mateus Viera Lima	Brazil	80		80
16		Mengyi Liu	China	80		80
16		Titus Mbayoh	Canada	80		80
16		Elton Pinto Mota	Portugal	80		80
16		Rafael Oliveira	Brazil	80		80
16		Burak Ozkul	Turkey	80		80
16		Manoj Patil	India	80		80
16		Chao Peng	China	80		80
16		Sidy Pouye	Spain	80		80
16		Victor Ramirez	Venezuela	80		80
16		Alexander Rogers	United States	80		80
16		Joven Sagabain	Philippines	80		80
16		Tyler Smith	United Kingdom	80		80
16		Julio Soares	Brazil	80		80
16		Omar Suleiman	United Kingdom	80		80
16		Junpei Taguchi	Japan	80		80
16		Leonardo Vecchiato	Italy	80		80
16		Lucas Viudes	Brazil	80		80
16		Deke Walker	United Kingdom	80		80
16		Emile Walker	United Kingdom	80		80
16		Heng Zhao	China	80		80

== 2025 Ms. Olympia Results ==
The Ms. Olympia division made its return to bodybuilding’s biggest stage in 2020 and has since been dominated by Andrea Shaw. That dominance continued in 2025, as Shaw secured her **sixth straight** Ms. Olympia title on Friday night, further solidifying her legacy in the sport.

Table key

Winner
Runner-Up
Third place

Place	Prize	Name	Country	Judging	Finals	Total
1	$50,000	Andrea Shaw	United States	5		5
2	$20,000	Ashley Lynnette Jones	United States	10		10
3	$12,000	Leyvina Barros	Brazil	15		15
4	$7,000	Angela Yeo	United States	20		20
5	$6,000	Alcione Santos Barreto	Brazil	27		27
6		Melissa Teich	United States	28		28
7		Natalia Kovaleva	United States	35		35
8		Nadia Capotosto	Italy	40		40
9		Tiana Flex	South Africa	45		45
10		Hunter Henderson	United States	52		52
11		Selyka Givan	United States	54		54
12		Chelsea Dion	United States	60		60
13		Martina Lopez	Spain	63		63

== 2025 Women's Fitness Olympia Results ==
The Fitness division was wide open in 2025 following reigning champion Missy Truscott’s move to the Figure category. That allowed rising star Michelle Fredua-Mensah to shine, as she made the most of the opportunity and earned her first Fitness Olympia title with a standout performance.

Table key

Winner
Runner-Up
Third place

Place	Prize	Name	Country	Judging	Finals	Total
1	$50,000	Michelle Fredua-Mensah	United Kingdom	7	38	45
2	$20,000	Jaclyn Baker	United States	16	38	54
3	$12,000	Taylor Learmont	Canada	45	10	55
4	$7,000	Amber Steffen	United States	40	28	68
5	$6,000	Anna Fomina	United States	35	52	87
6		Allison Kramer	United States	8	88	96
7		Amy Hamilton	Spain	29	74	103
8		Tamara Vahn	Canada	19	84	103
9		Andrea Glass	United States	55	56	111
10		Jenny Worth	United States	50	76	126
11		Jessica Zehr	Canada	25	110	135

== 2025 Women's Figure Olympia Results ==
With eight-time champion Cydney Gillon stepping away from competition after last year’s victory, the contest was wide open in 2025. During prejudging, a tight battle emerged between Rhea Gayle and Lola Montez, while Masters Olympia champion Jessica Reyes Padilla rounded out the top three.

Table key

Winner
Runner-Up
Third place

Place	Prize	Name	Country	Judging	Finals	Total
1	$50,000	Rhea Gayle	United Kingdom	7		7
2	$20,000	Lola Montez	Canada	8		8
3	$12,000	Jessica Reyes Padilla	Puerto Rico	15		15
4	$7,000	Denise Zwinger-Tynek	Germany	19		19
5	$6,000	Nicole Zenobia Graham	United States	27		27
6		Natalia Soltero	Mexico	29		29
7		Lena Ramsteiner	Germany	32		32
8		Ericka Morgan	Guatemala	38		38
9		Jennifer Zienert	Germany	46		46
10		Missy Truscott	United States	50		50
11		Adela Ondrejovicova	Slovakia	55		55
12		Manuella Lima	Brazil	59		59
13		Tamera Malone	United States	66		66
14		Maria Diaz	United States	72		72
15		Sandra Grajales	Mexico	73		73
16		Dorethane Agathina	Germany	80		80
16		Ayra Bahar	Germany	80		80
16		Kristina Bodnariuk	Russia	80		80
16		Anna Borin	Ukraine	80		80
16		Sherlyn Chee	Indonesia	80		80
16		Rejoice Godwin	Spain	80		80
16		Sophie Jenkins	United Kingdom	80		80
16		Chelsea Mooney	Canada	80		80
16		Taylor Santucci	United States	80		80
16		Aksana Yukhno	United States	80		80
16		Thais Cabrices Werner	United States	80		80
16		Helen Zavitsanou	Greece	80		80

== 2025 Women’s Physique Olympia Results ==
The long-standing rivalry in the Women’s Physique division added a new chapter in 2025. Natalia Abraham Coelho—after finishing second to Sarah Villegas in 2020 and 2021 before capturing her first win—reclaimed her throne this year. Villegas, following two consecutive titles of her own, was once again overtaken by Coelho, who returned to the top.

Table key

Winner
Runner-Up
Third place

Place	Prize	Name	Country	Judging	Finals	Total
1	$50,000	Natalia Abraham Coelho	Brazil	5		5
2	$20,000	Sarah Villegas	United States	10		10
3	$12,000	Zama Benta	Brazil	15		15
4	$7,000	Brittany Herrera	United States	20		20
5	$6,000	Sheronica Henton	United States	25		25
6		Barbara Menage	France	30		30
7		Nana Silva	Brazil	37		37
8		Meghan Morrison	United States	38		38
9		Paula Ranta	Finland	46		46
10		Evon Pennington	United States	49		49
11		Elena Aviles Romero	Spain	57		57
12		Amanda Machado	Brazil	58		58
13		Birgit Andersch	Austria	65		65
14		Sarah Crail	Australia	70		70
15		Julia Glazycheva	Russia	75		75
16		Robyn Mays	United States	78		78
16		Karla Melissa Torres Cruz	Mexico	80		80
16		Trisha Pollydore	Canada	80		80

== 2025 Bikini Olympia Results ==
Maureen Blanquisco claimed her first Bikini Olympia title in 2022. She placed second to Jennifer Dorie in 2023 but withdrew from last year’s event due to unforeseen setbacks. Returning stronger than ever in 2025, Maureen brought her best physique yet and secured her second Olympia crown.

Table key

Winner
Runner-Up
Third place

Place	Prize	Name	Country	Judging	Finals	Total
1	$50,000	Maureen Blanquisco	Philippines	5		5
2	$20,000	Ashlyn Little	United States	10		10
3	$12,000	Jasmine Gonzalez	United States	17		17
4	$7,000	Aimee Delgado	United States	19		19
5	$6,000	Ashley Kaltwasser	United States	25		25
6		Lauralie Chapados	Canada	30		30
7		Ivanna Escandar	Spain	35		35
8		Vania Auguste	United States	42		42
9		Maria Acosta	Venezuela	43		43
10		Ariana Brothers	United States	50		50
11		Reyna Perez Mecalco	Mexico	58		58
12		Jourdanne Lee	Canada	61		61
13		Jordan Brannon	United States	64		64
14		Sally-Anne Kato	Japan	70		70
15		Viktoria Csicsayova	Hungary	75		75
16		Ji Bin Park	South Korea	79		79
16		Iulia Baba	Romania	80		80
16		Uyanga Bataa	Mongolia	80		80
16		Wu Bi	China	80		80
16		Liang Bin	China	80		80
16		Nivea Campos	Brazil	80		80
16		Kate Carroll	New Zealand	80		80
16		Xinyi Chen	China	80		80
16		Sara Choi	South Korea	80		80
16		Lu Corzo	Argentina	80		80
16		Taylor Crowell	United States	80		80
16		Deanna Dang	United States	80		80
16		Wenjun Duan	China	80		80
16		Marie-Eve Duchesneau	Canada	80		80
16		Lawna Dunbar	United States	80		80
16		Valeria Fedorenko	Ukraine	80		80
16		Jess Feeney	Ireland	80		80
16		Brittany Gillespie	United States	80		80
16		Gulsah Gorgulu	Turkey	80		80
16		Tara Grier	United States	80		80
16		Ashley Hampton	United States	80		80
16		Kerryne Henich	United States	80		80
16		Chantal Hill	Spain	80		80
16		Dahye Jeon	South Korea	80		80
16		Adrianna Kaczmarek	Poland	80		80
16		Nittaya Kongthun	Thailand	80		80
16		Lauren Kralovec	United States	80		80
16		Yume Kurokawa	Japan	80		80
16		Adair Libbrecht	Canada	80		80
16		Jessica Liu	Canada	80		80
16		Alice Marchisio	Italy	80		80
16		Zsofia Molnar	Hungary	80		80
16		Ndeye Ndour	United States	80		80
16		Yurika Noda	United States	80		80
16		Hye-Yeon Park	South Korea	80		80
16		Sara Punzetti	Italy	80		80
16		Sharon Ramos	Dominican Republic	80		80
16		Lisa Reith	Germany	80		80
16		Alice Rocha	United States	80		80
16		Lacy Rutland	United States	80		80
16		Jil Meret Schmitz	Thailand	80		80
16		Anna Setlak	Italy	80		80
16		Kerry Sexton	United Kingdom	80		80
16		Eugenia Shatova	Russia	80		80
16		Li Shuai	China	80		80
16		Allison Testu	France	80		80
16		Cristobalina Pajares Torres	Spain	80		80
16		Patrizia Vaccaro	Italy	80		80
16		Ally Vatthauer	United States	80		80
16		Savannah Watchman	United States	80		80
16		Tianna Weymouth	United States	80		80
16		Jessica Wilson	United States	80		80
16		Mengru Zhang	China	80		80

== 2025 Women’s Wellness Olympia Results ==
With three-time champion Francielle Mattos absent from this year’s competition, the 2025 Wellness Olympia division was wide open and fiercely competitive. Rising contender Eduarda Bezerra faced off against the reigning champion Isabelle Nunes, ultimately capturing her first Olympia title in dominant fashion.

Table key

Winner
Runner-Up
Third place

Place	Prize	Name	Country	Judging	Finals	Total
1	$50,000	Eduarda Bezerra	Brazil	5		5
2	$20,000	Isabelle Nunes	Brazil	12		12
3	$12,000	Elisa Alcantara	Dominican Republic	13		13
4	$7,000	Rayane Fogal	Brazil	20		20
5	$6,000	Leonida Ciobu	Moldova	25		25
6		Valquiria Lopes	Brazil	30		30
7		Lisa Meiswinkel	Germany	37		37
8		Camile Luz	Brazil	38		38
9		Raeli Dias	Brazil	47		47
10		Daniele Mendonca	Brazil	49		49
11		Liza Kazanina	Ukraine	56		56
12		Kassandra Gillis	Canada	62		62
13		Alexis Nicole	United States	69		69
14		Danai Theodoropoulou	Australia	71		71
15		Giselle Machado	Brazil	72		72
16		Isamara Santos	Brazil	79		79
16		Emily Azzarello	Canada	80		80
16		Karol Borrero	Colombia	80		80
16		Jade Cristaldo	Spain	80		80
16		Klaudia Vanessza Csuri	Hungary	80		80
16		Shanique Grant	United States	80		80
16		Renata Soares Guaraciaba	Brazil	80		80
16		Michelle Ibata	Brazil	80		80
16		Maria Rita Penteado	United States	80		80
16		Tiffany Sam	Lebanon	80		80
16		Pamela Rodrigues De Paula	Brazil	80		80
16		Rosemary Rodriguez	Paraguay	80		80
16		Alicia Romero	Spain	80		80
16		Nicole Salazar	Costa Rica	80		80
16		Sina Maria Teresa	Angola	80		80

== 2025 Men's Wheelchair Olympia Results ==
With six-time champion Harold Kelley absent from the 2025 Wheelchair Olympia, the title was up for grabs. Rising competitor James Berger capitalized on the opportunity, making a strong impression and earning his first Olympia title.

Table key

Winner
Runner-Up
Third place

Place	Prize	Name	Country	Judging	Finals	Total
1		James Berger	United States	5		5
2		Kevin Secundino	France	10		10
3		Rajesh John	India	15		15
4		Josue Fabiano Barretto Monteiro	Brazil	20		20
5		Gabriele Andriulli	Italy	25		25
6		Antonio Matkovic	Montenegro	30		30
7		Jason Metcalf	United States	37		37
8		Oscar Gonzalez Gil	Spain	38		38
9		Brayden Hofman	Canada	45		45
10		Cosmo Trikes	United States	50		50
