= Nick Walker (bodybuilder) =

American professional bodybuilder (born 1994)

- Professional bodybuilder
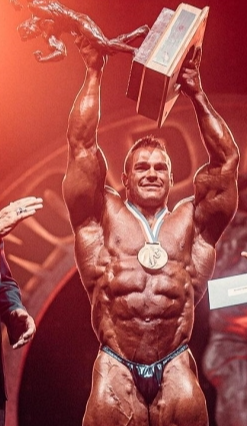
- Walker in 2021

Personal info
- Nickname: The Mutant
- Born: August 3, 1994 (age 32); Pine Hill, New Jersey, U.S.

Best statistics
- Height: 5 ft 7 in (170 cm)
- Weight: 270–295 lb (122–134 kg)

Professional (Pro) career
- Pro-debut: Chicago Pro; 2020
- Best win: Mr. Olympia; 2026
- Predecessor: Derek Lunsford
Medal record
Men's bodybuilding
IFBB Mr. Olympia
5th	2021 Mr. Olympia	Men's Open
3rd	2022 Mr. Olympia	Men's Open
6th	2025 Mr. Olympia	Men's Open
1st	2026 Mr. Olympia	Men's Open
Arnold Classic
1st	2021 Arnold Classic	Men's Open
2nd	2023 Arnold Classic	Men's Open
2nd	2026 Arnold Classic	Men's Open
Other IFBB Pro contests
4th	2020 Chicago Pro	Men's Open
1st	2021 New York Pro	Men's Open
1st	2024 New York Pro	Men's Open
2nd	2025 Pittsburgh Pro	Men's Open
1st	2025 New York Pro	Men's Open
1st	2026 Tampa Pro	Men's Open

Nick Walker (born August 3, 1994) is an American professional bodybuilder who competes in the men's open bodybuilding division in the IFBB Pro League. He won the Mr. Olympia in 2026 and the Arnold Classic in 2021.

== Biography ==
Nick Walker was born on August 3, 1994, in Pine Hill, New Jersey.. He began competing in bodybuilding in 2012 and competed in several amateur contests before reaching the professional level. In 2019, he placed second in the super-heavyweight division at the NPC USA Championships. The following year, Walker won the super-heavyweight and overall titles at the 2020 NPC North American Championships, which earned him professional status in the IFBB Pro League.

Walker made his professional debut at the 2020 Chicago Pro, where he finished fourth in the Men's Open division. His breakthrough season came in 2021. He won the New York Pro, earning his first professional victory, and later won the Arnold Classic in Columbus, Ohio, ahead of Iain Valliere and Steve Kuclo. Walker made his Mr. Olympia debut later that year and finished fifth.

Walker returned to the Mr. Olympia in 2022 and placed third behind winner Hadi Choopan and runner-up Derek Lunsford. He also received the People's Champion Award. In March 2023, he competed at the Arnold Classic and finished second behind Samson Dauda. Walker was scheduled to compete at the 2023 Mr. Olympia but withdrew shortly before the competition after suffering a hamstring tear during his preparation.

Walker returned to competition at the 2024 New York Pro, where he won the Men's Open division for the second time. The victory qualified him for the 2024 Mr. Olympia, but he later withdrew from the competition. In 2025, Walker finished second at the Pittsburgh Pro behind Derek Lunsford before winning the New York Pro for a third time. He subsequently competed at the 2025 Mr. Olympia, finishing sixth.

In March 2026, Walker finished second at the Arnold Classic behind Andrew Jacked. On August 1, he won the Tampa Pro, securing qualification for the 2026 Mr. Olympia. Walker won the 2026 Mr. Olympia in Las Vegas, finishing ahead of Samson Dauda and Derek Lunsford. He also received the People's Champion Award for the second time.

== Competitive history ==
- 2016 NPC South Jersey Championships – 1st (Heavyweight)
- 2019 NPC South Jersey Championships – 1st (Super Heavyweight)
- 2019 NPC USA Championships – 2nd (Super Heavyweight)
- 2020 NPC North American Championships – 1st (Super Heavyweight/Overall)
- 2020 Chicago Pro – 4th (Men's Open)
- 2021 New York Pro – 1st (Men's Open)
- 2021 Arnold Classic – 1st (Men's Open)
- 2021 Mr. Olympia – 5th (Men's Open)
- 2022 Mr. Olympia – 3rd (Men's Open)
- 2023 Arnold Classic – 2nd (Men's Open)
- 2024 New York Pro – 1st (Men's Open)
- 2025 Pittsburgh Pro – 2nd (Men's Open)
- 2025 New York Pro – 1st (Men's Open)
- 2025 Mr. Olympia – 6th (Men's Open)
- 2026 Arnold Classic – 2nd (Men's Open)
- 2026 Tampa Pro – 1st (Men's Open)
- 2026 Mr. Olympia – 1st (Men's Open)

Preceded by Derek Lunsford	Mr. Olympia; 2026	Succeeded by —
