= Samson Dauda =

Nigerian-British professional bodybuilder

- Professional bodybuilder

Personal info
- Nickname: The Nigerian Lion
- Born: 11 March 1986 (age 40); Kaduna, Nigeria

Best statistics
- Height: 5 ft 11 in (180 cm)
- Weight: 275–330 lb (125–150 kg)

Professional (Pro) career
- Pro-debut: EVLS Prague Showdown; 2018
- Best win: IFBB Mr. Olympia; 2024
- Predecessor: Derek Lunsford
- Successor: Derek Lunsford
Medal record
Men's bodybuilding
IFBB Mr. Olympia
5th	2022 Mr. Olympia	Men's Open
3rd	2023 Mr. Olympia	Men's Open
1st	2024 Mr. Olympia	Men's Open
4th	2025 Mr. Olympia	Men's Open
2nd	2026 Mr. Olympia	Men's Open
Other IFBB Pro contests
2nd	2021 IFBB Romania Muscle Fest Pro
1st	2021 IFBB EVLS Prague Pro
2nd	2022 Arnold Classis UK
1st	2023 Arnold Classis US
1st	2023 IFBB Romania Muscle Fest Pro
1st	2023 IFBB EVLS Prague Pro
2nd	2024 Arnold Classis US
2nd	2024 Arnold Classis US
1st	2024 IFBB Tsunami France Pro
2nd	2025 Arnold Classis US
2nd	2025 IFBB EVLS Prague Pro
1st	2026 IFBB Europa Pro

Samson Dauda (born 11 March 1986) is a British-Nigerian professional bodybuilder who competes in the men's open bodybuilding division in the IFBB Pro League. He won the 2024 Mr. Olympia and the Arnold Classic in 2023.

== Biography ==
Samson Dauda was born in Kaduna, Nigeria, on 11 March 1986. He moved to the United Kingdom during his teenage years from Kaduna, where he initially focused on playing rugby. Dauda holds both British and French citizenship. His introduction to bodybuilding came through encouragement from his rugby teammates and a gym owner, Chris Jones. After witnessing Phil Heath at the 2013 Mr. Olympia, Dauda shifted his focus to competitive bodybuilding and entered his first bodybuilding competition in April 2014. Before committing to bodybuilding full-time, Dauda worked in construction and as a care home maintenance worker, eventually deciding to leave his job in 2020 during a show in South Korea to focus entirely on his bodybuilding career.

Dauda earned his IFBB Pro card in 2017 after winning the overall title at the IFBB Amateur Diamond Cup Rome, marking a turning point in his bodybuilding career. The following year, he made his professional debut at the EVLS Prague Showdown in 2018, placing 5th. His first victory as an IFBB Pro athlete came in 2021 at the EVLS Prague Pro, which earned him qualification for the 2022 Mr. Olympia, where he made his debut and finished 6th. In 2023, he won the Arnold Classic US and later improved his standing at the 2023 Mr. Olympia, finishing 3rd. In 2024, Dauda won the 2024 Mr. Olympia by surpassing Hadi Choopan and Derek Lunsford, and also claimed the People's Champion title. He became the first bodybuilder of Nigerian descent to win the Mr. Olympia competition.

In March 2025, Dauda finished second at the Arnold Classic, behind Derek Lunsford and ahead of Andrew Jacked. He returned to the 2025 Mr. Olympia as the defending champion but finished fourth behind Lunsford, Hadi Choopan and Andrew Jacked. Later that month, he placed second to Martin Fitzwater at the EVLS Prague Pro.

In September 2026, Dauda won the Europa Pro in Offenbach, Germany, finishing ahead of Regan Grimes and John Jewett. Two weeks later, he competed at the 2026 Mr. Olympia and finished second behind Nick Walker, with Derek Lunsford placing third.

Dauda was initially coached by his wife, Marlena Gustowska, who gave up her own bodybuilding career to focus on Dauda's career. Miloš Šarčev was Dauda's coach for 13 professional shows and departed in 2024; Dauda's wife again assumed the role of his coach.

== Competitive history ==
- 2014 WABBA World Championships – 2nd (Tall)
- 2015 IFBB Amateur Olympia UK – 8th (Over 100 kg)
- 2015 IFBB British Championships – 3rd (Super heavyweight)
- 2016 IFBB British Championships – 4th (Super heavyweight)
- 2017 IFBB Amateur Arnold Classic Europe – 5th (Over 100 kg)
- 2017 IFBB Amateur Diamond Cup Rome – 1st (Over 90 kg and overall)
- 2018 EVLS Prague Showdown – 5th
- 2018 George Farah Classic Pro Italy – 9th
- 2018 IFBB Prague Pro – 5th
- 2018 IFBB Romania Muscle Fest Pro – 11th
- 2019 IFBB British Grand Prix – 2nd
- 2019 IFBB Chicago Pro – 7th
- 2019 IFBB Portugal Pro – 5th
- 2019 IFBB Vancouver Pro – 8th
- 2020 IFBB British Grand Prix – 6th
- 2020 IFBB Europa Dallas Pro – 5th
- 2020 IFBB Monsterzym Pro – 2nd
- 2021 IFBB Romania Muscle Fest Pro – 2nd
- 2021 IFBB EVLS Prague Pro – 1st
- 2021 IFBB KO Egypt Pro – 3rd
- 2021 IFBB Yamamoto Cup Pro – 3rd
- 2022 IFBB Arnold Classic US – 4th
- 2021 IFBB Arnold Classic UK – 2nd
- 2022 IFBB Boston Pro – 4th
- 2022 IFBB Mr. Olympia – 6th
- 2023 IFBB Arnold Classic US – 1st
- 2023 IFBB Mr. Olympia – 3rd
- 2023 IFBB Romania Muscle Fest Pro – 1st
- 2023 IFBB EVLS Prague Pro – 1st
- 2024 IFBB Arnold Classic US – 2nd
- 2024 IFBB Arnold Classic UK – 2nd
- 2024 IFBB Tsunami France Pro – 1st
- 2024 IFBB Mr. Olympia – 1st
- 2025 IFBB Arnold Classic US – 2nd
- 2025 IFBB Mr. Olympia – 4th
- 2026 IFBB Europa Pro – 1st
- 2026 IFBB Mr. Olympia – 2nd

Preceded by Derek Lunsford	Mr. Olympia; 2024	Succeeded by Derek Lunsford
