= Andrzej Maszewski =

Polish bodybuilder

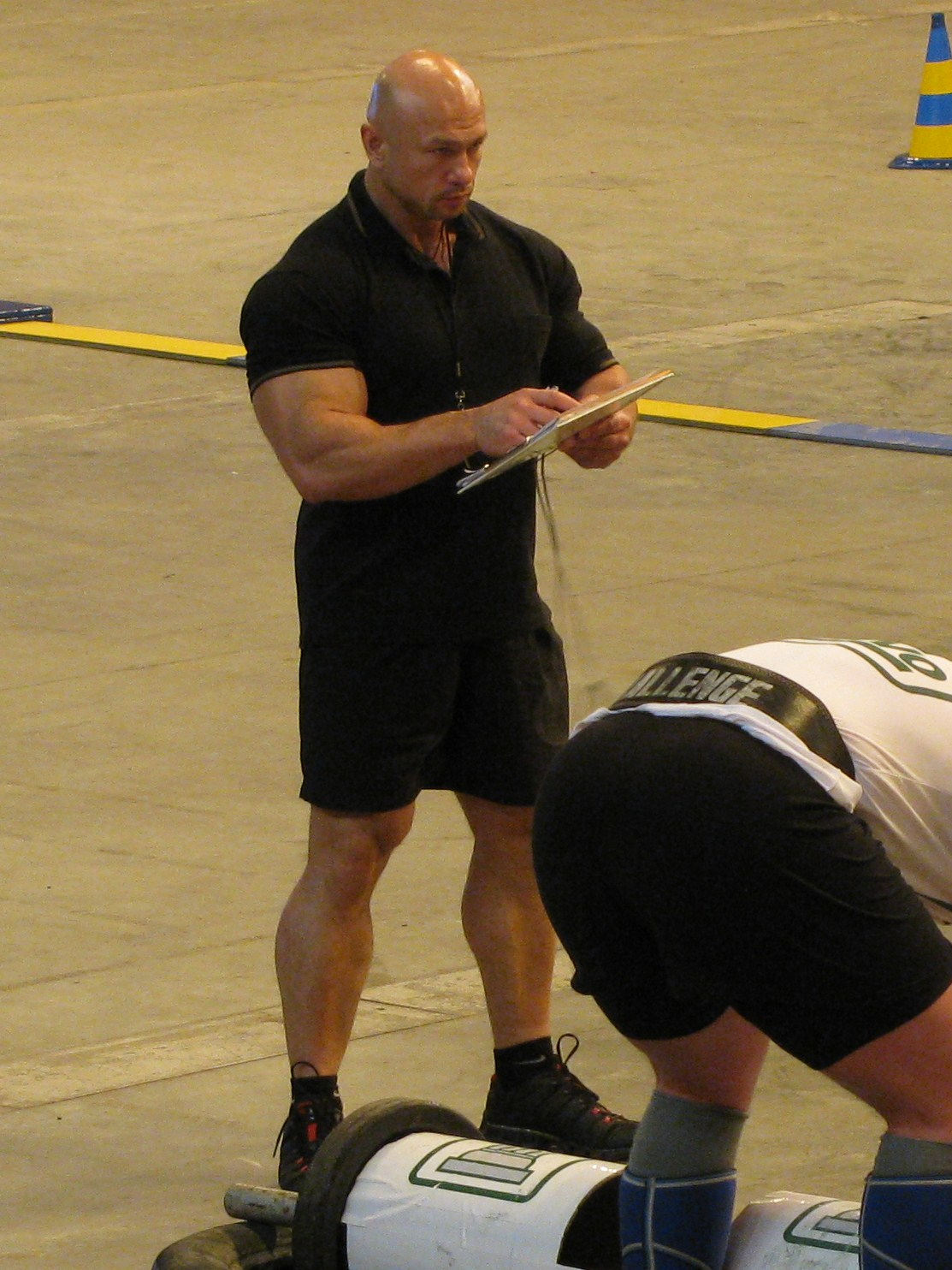
Andrzej Maszewski (2009).

Andrzej Maszewski (born May 31, 1970) is a Polish bodybuilder. He started training at the age of 16. He received several medals during the European Weightlifting Championships in 2003-2006.

At the 2009 Arnold Amateur contest, Andrzej placed 4th in the heavyweight class. In 2010 he won the class, but lost the overall to super heavyweight Essa Hassan-Obaid. In November 2009, Maszewski won the Fitness Authority Grand Prix in Poland.
