= Wesley Vissers =

Dutch IFBB professional bodybuilder (born 1993)

- Professional bodybuilder

Personal info
- Nickname: The Dutch Oak
- Born: May 6, 1993 (age 33); Oosterhout, Netherlands

Best statistics
- Height: 6 ft 2.5 in (1.89 m)
- Weight: 255 lb (116 kg) (Contest); 299 lb (136 kg) (Off-Season)

Professional (Pro) career
- Pro-debut: IFBB Chicago Pro; 2018
- Best win: Arnold Classic Ohio; 2024 & 2026
- Active: Yes

Wesley Vissers (born May 6, 1993) is a Dutch IFBB professional bodybuilder. He won the Arnold Classic physique in 2024 and 2026, and earlier in his career the IFBB Romanian, the IFBB Poland and IFBB France Pro competition in 2019, 2021 and 2022.

== Early life ==
Wesley Vissers was born in the Netherlands during the spring of 1993 in the city of Oosterhout. He began lifting weights at age 14 after being inspired by his father. Vissers studied Nutrition & Dietetics at HAN University of Applied Sciences.

== Career ==
=== Amateur career ===
Wesley Vissers' first competition was the 2013 Flexcup where he placed first overall in the junior division. He then followed that result up the next year by taking first overall in the open division of the same show. That same year he also claimed first overall in the junior division of the 2014 Juliette Bergmann Grand Prix.

After a two-year gap between competitions Vissers returned to the stage in 2016 to compete in the European Arnold Classic. Here he placed fifth overall in the junior division.

Vissers followed this performance in the 2016 Juliette Bergman Grand Prix where he placed first overall amongst the junior division and second overall in super heavy-weight division. The next year he placed first overall in the 2017 Juliette Bergman Grand Prix open division.

In 2018, Vissers entered and took first overall in the classic division of Royal London Pro qualifier. Here he earned his IFBB pro card officially making him a professional bodybuilder.

=== Professional career ===
In 2018, Vissers traveled to the United States to enter his first IFBB professional competition, the 2018 Chicago Pro. Here he placed first overall amongst 18 men in the classic division to claim his invitation to the 2018 Mr. Olympia competition.

In the 2018 Mr. Olympia, Vissers went head to head with the top classic physique athletes in the world including the previous year's top two of Breon Ansley and Chris Bumstead. Vissers would finish a tied 14th place among the 26 competitors.

Vissers returned to the stage the following year in the 2019 Arnold Classic. Here he placed outside of the top 6 in the classic physique division. Vissers skipped the 2019 Mr. Olympia competition, but returned to the Classic Physique pro stage later the same year at the 2019 IFBB Romania Pro, which he won, securing his 2020 Mr. Olympia qualification.

The following years Vissers went on to win 2021 IFBB Poland Pro, 2022 IFBB France Pro, 2023 IFBB European Championships and 2023 IFBB Romania Pro.

In the 2024 he won two back-to-back Arnold Classic Physique competitions (Arnold Classic US and Arnold Classic UK).

== Contest history ==
- 1st - FlexCup, 2013, Junior Division, Veldhoven, Netherlands
- 1st - FlexCup, 2014, Open Division, Veldhoven, Netherlands
- 2nd - Ironman & Ironmaiden, 2014, Junior Division, Sommelsdijk, Netherlands
- 1st - Juliette Bergman Grand Prix, 2014, Junior Division, Sommelsdijk, Netherlands
- 5th - Arnold Classic Europe, 2016, Junior Division, Barcelona, Spain
- 1st - Juliette Bergman Grand Prix, 2016, Junior Division, Hilversum, Netherlands
- 1st - Mr Golden Era, 2017, NSP Online Competition
- 4th - Pepa Grand Prix, 2017, Open Division, Opava, Czech Republic
- 1st - Juliette Bergman Grand Prix, 2017, Open Division, Hilversum, Netherlands
- 1st - Royal London Pro, 2018, Classic Physique, London, England, United Kingdom (earned the IFBB pro card)
- 1st - Chicago Pro, 2018, Classic Physique, Chicago, Illinois, United States
- 16th - Mr Olympia, 2018, Classic Physique, Las Vegas, Nevada, United States
- 10th - Arnold Classic, 2019, Classic Physique, Columbus, Ohio, United States
- 1st - Romania Muscle Fest Pro, 2019, Classic Physique, Bucharest, Romania
- 11th - Mr Olympia, 2020, Classic Physique, Orlando, Florida, United States
- 3rd - Mr Big Evolution Pro Portugal, 2021, Classic Physique, Estorl, Portugal
- 1st - Battle of Champions Pro Poland, 2021, Classic Physique, Warsaw, Poland
- 11th - Mr Olympia, 2021, Classic Physique, Orlando, Florida, United States
- 3rd - Arnold Classic UK, 2022, Classic Physique, Birmingham, England, United Kingdom
- 1st - Yamamoto Pro Cup France, 2022, Classic Physique, Lille, France
- 8th - Mr Olympia, 2022, Classic Physique, Las Vegas, Nevada, United States
- 1st - Europa Pro, 2023, Classic Physique, Alicante, Spain
- 3rd - Dubai Pro, 2023, Classic Physique, Dubai, Emirate of Dubai, United Arab Emirates
- 7th - Mr Olympia, 2023, Classic Physique, Orlando, Florida, United States
- 1st - Romania Muscle Fest Pro, 2023, Classic Physique, Bucharest, Romania
- 1st - Arnold Classic, 2024, Classic Physique, Columbus, Ohio, United States
- 1st - Arnold Classic UK, 2024, Classic Physique, Birmingham, England, United Kingdom
- 8th - Mr Olympia, 2024, Classic Physique, Las Vegas, Nevada, United States
- 5th - Arnold Classic, 2025, Classic Physique, Columbus, Ohio, United States
- 2nd - Detroit Pro, 2025, Classic Physique, Detroit, Michigan, United States
- 1st - Arnold Classic, 2026, Classic Physique, Columbus, Ohio, United States
- 1st - Detroit Pro, 2026, Classic Physique, Detroit, Michigan, United States
- 2nd - Arnold Classic UK, 2026, Classic Physique, Birmingham, England, United Kingdom
- 4th - Mr Olympia, 2026, Classic Physique, Las Vegas, Nevada, United States

== Vintage Genetics ==
Wesley Vissers along with his family founded and run the Vintage Genetics brand. They offer bodybuilding inspired clothing, footwear, training gear, and online personal coaching. In 2017 Vintage Genetics worked together with Nutritech to produce a bodybuilding supplement line. As of 2019, the owner of Vintage Genetics, Wesley Vissers, has started his own supplement line named Gladiator Sports Pro of which each supplement is personally formulated by Vissers himself.

== Personal life ==
Wesley Vissers's is residing in Best, Netherlands. His girlfriend, former judoka Marly Nooijen, is the owner of 100% FitGym, the gym that Vissers has used since late 2017 to work for the achievement of his IFBB Pro card, his IFBB Pro League Win and every other accomplishment thereafter. The gym is located in Best, the Netherlands and is also used to accommodate coaching and posing lessons for eager bodybuilders. Wesley Vissers also has a younger brother named Kane who is an aspiring amateur bodybuilder. Vissers and his girlfriend have a son named Dexter, and a daughter named Lara.
