= Rajesh John =

Indian professional bodybuilder

- Professional bodybuilder
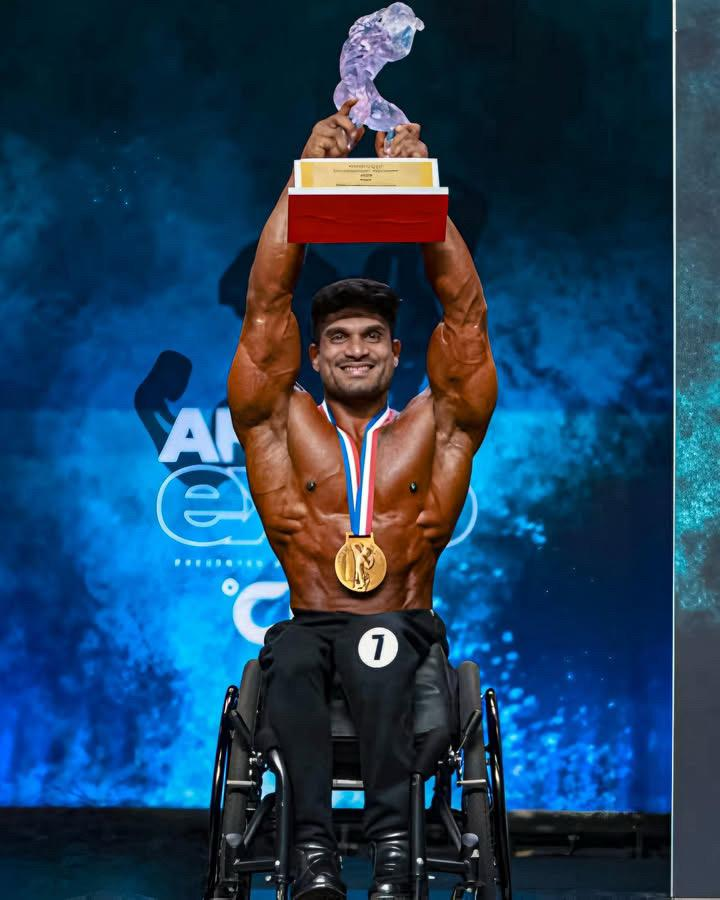
- Rajesh John at the Arnold Sports Festival 2025 in Ohio

Personal info
- Born: Kollam, Kerala, India

Best statistics
- Height: 5 ft 4 in (163 cm)
- Weight: 150 lb (68 kg)

Professional (Pro) career
- Pro-debut: Mr. Kerala; 2009
- Best win: Arnold Classic Pro Wheelchair; 2025
- Active: 2009 - Present

Rajesh John is an Indian bodybuilder and fitness trainer from Kerala, best known for his achievements in professional wheelchair bodybuilding. He was the first Indian to win the Arnold Classic Pro Wheelchair title at the Arnold Sports Festival in 2024 and successfully defended his title in 2025. At the Mr. Olympia Pro Wheelchair competition, he secured fifth place in 2026, third place in 2025, and sixth place in 2024. The competition is part of the Mr. Olympia event. John also won the Mr. World title for the differently abled in 2016 and won the World Fitness Federation’s Mr. India title for the differently abled twice, in 2016 and 2018.

== Personal life ==
Rajesh was born to Ummarapallil M.D. John and Omana John in Thazhathuvadaku, Kollam district in the Indian State of Kerala. He completed his schooling from Holy Trinity School Thiruvananthapuram and Mar Thoma Dynoysius School Pathanapuram. After attaining higher secondary education from IHRD T.H.S.S. Adoor, he completed a diploma in electronics and computer networking from NSS College, Pathanamthitta. Rajesh works as a fitness trainer and he runs a gym at Enathu in Pathanamthitta district, Kerala.

== Career and achievements ==
Rajesh was the runner-up in the 2009 Mr. Kerala competition and won the title 2010, 2011, and 2012. He won the Mr. India title (differently abled category) three times, in 2009 (IBBF, Ludhiana), 2011 (IBBF, Nashik), and 2013 IBBF, Khammam). He won the WFF Mr. World title for differently abled 2016 at Ireland, WFF Eurasia Championship 2018 at Kyiv.

In 2023, he won the Sheru Classic India Pro Wheelchair, in Mumbai which helped him qualify for the Arnold Classic Pro Wheelchair competition in 2024. He became the first Indian to win the title at the Arnold Sports Festival in 2024, held at the Greater Columbus Convention Center in Columbus and successfully defended his title in 2025.

At the Mr.Olympia Pro Wheelchair competition, he secured sixth place in 2024, third place in 2025 and fifth place in 2026.
