= Arnold Sports Festival =

IFBB Pro annual multi-sport event

- The official logo of the Arnold Sports Festival
- Founded: 1989; 37 years ago
- Country: United States
- Venues: Greater Columbus Convention Center, Columbus, Ohio
- Most recent champion: (United Arab Emirates) Andrew Jacked (2026)
- Tournament format: Multi-event competition
- Website: arnoldsports.com

The IFBB Pro Arnold Sports Festival, also known as the Arnold Schwarzenegger Sports Festival, is an annual multi-sport event consisting of professional bodybuilding (Arnold Classic), strongman (Arnold Strongman Classic), armlifting, fitness, figure, bikini and several others as a weekend expo. It was established in 1989 and is named after Arnold Schwarzenegger. The main event is held annually around late February or early March in Columbus, Ohio, by the International Federation of Bodybuilding & Fitness Professional League (IFBB Pro League). It is considered one of the most prestigious events in professional men's bodybuilding, physique, figure and bikini after Joe Weider's Olympia. When the Ms. International competition was hosted, until 2013, it was one of the most prestigious events in professional female bodybuilding (after Ms. Olympia).

== History ==
A sports competition, the ASF offers a number of large prizes. Most notably, first prize in bodybuilding consists of a $130,000 check, a Hummer vehicle, and an Audemars Piguet watch. Since the Mr. Olympia bodybuilding title pre-dates and offers higher prize money than the ASF, a rivalry in prestige and popularity has sprung up. The ASF is always hotly contested, often with one or two competition points separating the winners.

All-star cheerleading competitions span a two-day period (usually all day Saturday, and to midday Sunday). More than 4,000 competitors entered the cheerleading event in 2014. Each team (of 15–30 cheerleaders) prepares to perform a two and one-half minute routine. After the teams' routines are complete, they are scored by a panel of judges, each judge being an expert on one area of cheerleading (jumps, tumbling, stunting, etc.). Once scoring is complete, every team entered in the competition is called to the mat for awards, during which each team has a chance of winning multiple times. The ASF's awards consist of the following: National Champion jackets, trophies for every team, custom medals, limited edition patches and Grand Champion banners, and possible partial or full paid bid to Cheerleading World contests.

On June 7, 2013, the ASF's event promoter, Jim Lorimer, announced that from 2014 on, the ASF's "212" (a professional, men's bodybuilding division) would permanently replace the Ms. International women's bodybuilding competition. Lorimer, in a statement, said "The Arnold Sports Festival was proud to support women's bodybuilding through the Ms. International for the past quarter century, but in keeping with demands of our fans, the time has come to introduce the Arnold Classic 212 beginning in 2014. We are excited to create a professional competitive platform for some of the IFBB Pro League's most popular competitors."

On March 3, 2020 Ohio governor Mike DeWine cancelled most of the Arnold Sports Festival due to the oncoming COVID-19 pandemic in Ohio, before any cases or deaths had been reported. The cancellation was widely regarded as 'radical' at the time.

== Champions ==
Year	Arnold Classic					Ms. International			Fitness International	Figure International	Bikini International	212	Women's Physique	Men's Physique	Classic Physique
Year	Overall	Best Poser	Most Muscular	Fan's Choice Award	Most Entertaining Routine	Overall	Heavyweight	Lightweight							
1989	(United States) Rich Gaspari					(United States) Jackie Paisley									
1990	(United States) Mike Ashley					(Canada) Laura Creavalle									
1991	(United States) Shawn Ray					(United States) Tonya Knight									
1992	(United States) Vince Taylor					(Germany) Anja Schreiner									
1993	(United States) Flex Wheeler					(United States) Kim Chizevsky-Nicholls									
1994	(United States) Kevin Levrone					(Canada) Laura Creavalle			(United States) Carol Semple-Marzetta						
1995	(United States) Mike Francois					(Canada) Laura Creavalle			(United States) Carol Semple-Marzetta						
1996	(United States) Kevin Levrone					(United States) Kim Chizevsky-Nicholls			(Hungary) Alexandra Béres						
1997	(United States) Flex Wheeler					(United States) Yolanda Hughes-Heying			(United States) Carol Semple-Marzetta						
1998	(United States) Flex Wheeler					(United States) Yolanda Hughes-Heying			(United States) Susie Curry						
1999	(Serbia and Montenegro) Nasser El Sonbaty					(United States) Vickie Gates			(United States) Susie Curry						
2000	(United States) Flex Wheeler					(United States) Vickie Gates	(United States) Vickie Gates	(United States) Brenda Raganot	(United States) Kelly Ryan						
2001	(United States) Ronnie Coleman					(United States) Vickie Gates	(United States) Vickie Gates	(Canada) Dayana Cadeau	(Canada) Jenny Worth						
2002	(United States) Jay Cutler					(Venezuela) Yaxeni Oriquen-Garcia	(Venezuela) Yaxeni Oriquen-Garcia	(Ukraine) Valentina Chepiga	(United States) Susie Curry						
2003	(United States) Jay Cutler					(Venezuela) Yaxeni Oriquen-Garcia	(Venezuela) Yaxeni Oriquen-Garcia	(Canada) Cathy LeFrançois	(United States) Susie Curry	(United States) Jenny Lynn					
2004	(United States) Jay Cutler					(United States) Iris Kyle	(United States) Iris Kyle	(Canada) Dayana Cadeau	(United States) Adela Garcia-Friedmansky	(United States) Jenny Lynn					
2005	(United States) Dexter Jackson					(Venezuela) Yaxeni Oriquen-Garcia	(Venezuela) Yaxeni Oriquen-Garcia	(United States) Brenda Raganot	(United States) Jen Hendershott	(United States) Jenny Lynn					
2006	(United States) Dexter Jackson					(United States) Iris Kyle	Heavyweight category not held.	Lightweight category not held.	(United States) Adela Garcia-Friedmansky	(United States) Mary Lado					
2007	(Dominican Republic) Víctor Martínez					(United States) Iris Kyle	Heavyweight category not held.	Lightweight category not held.	(United States) Kim Klein	(United States) Mary Lado					
2008	(United States) Dexter Jackson					(Venezuela) Yaxeni Oriquen-Garcia	Heavyweight category not held.	Lightweight category not held.	(United States) Kim Klein	(United States) Gina Aliotti					
2009	(United States) Kai Greene	(United States) Kai Greene	(United States) Branch Warren			(United States) Iris Kyle	Heavyweight category not held.	Lightweight category not held.	(United States) Jen Hendershott	(Lithuania) Živilė Raudonienė					
2010	(United States) Kai Greene	(United States) Kai Greene	(United States) Branch Warren			(United States) Iris Kyle	Heavyweight category not held.	Lightweight category not held.	(United States) Adela Garcia-Friedmansky	(United States) Nicole Wilkins-Lee					
2011	(United States) Branch Warren	(Germany) Dennis Wolf	(United States) Branch Warren	(United States) Branch Warren		(United States) Iris Kyle	Heavyweight category not held.	Lightweight category not held.	(United States) Adela Garcia-Friedmansky	(United States) Nicole Wilkins-Lee	(United States) Nicole Nagrani				
2012	(United States) Branch Warren	Best Poser category not held.	(United States) Branch Warren	Fan's Choice Award category not held.	(United States) Branch Warren	(Venezuela) Yaxeni Oriquen-Garcia	Heavyweight category not held.	Lightweight category not held.	(United States) Adela Garcia-Friedmansky	(United States) Nicole Wilkins-Lee	(United States) Sonia Gonzales				
2013	(United States) Dexter Jackson	Best Poser category not held.	Most Muscular category not held.	Fan's Choice Award category not held.	Most Entertaining Routine category not held.	(United States) Iris Kyle	Heavyweight category not held.	Lightweight category not held.	(United States) Tanji Johnson	(United States) Candice Keene	(United States) India Paulino				
2014	(Germany) Dennis Wolf	Best Poser category not held.	Most Muscular category not held.	Fan's Choice Award category not held.	Most Entertaining Routine category not held.	Ms. International category not held.			(Russia) Oksana Grishina	(United States) Candice Keene	(United States) Ashley Kaltwasser	(United Kingdom) James Lewis			
2015	(United States) Dexter Jackson	Best Poser category not held.	Most Muscular category not held.	Fan's Choice Award category not held.	Most Entertaining Routine category not held.	Ms. International category not held.			(Russia) Oksana Grishina	(United States) Camala Rodriguez-McClure	(United States) Ashley Kaltwasser	(United States) Jose Raymond	(Brazil) Juliana Malacarne	(Bosnia and Herzegovina) Sadik Hadzovic	
2016	(United States) Kai Greene					Ms. International category not held.			(Russia) Oksana Grishina	(United States) Latorya Watts	(United States) India Paulino	(Japan) Hidetada Yamagishi	(United States) Autumn Swansen	(United States) Brandon Hendrickson	
2017	(United States) Cedric McMillan					Ms. International category not held.			(Russia) Oksana Grishina	(United States) Candice Lewis-Carter	(Brazil) Angelica Teixeira	(Kuwait) Ahmad Ashkanani	(Brazil) Daniely Castilho	(United Kingdom) Ryan Terry	
2018	(Netherlands) William Bonac	(United States) Fred Smalls	(Curaçao) Roelly Winklaar			Ms. International category not held.			(United States) Whitney Jones	(United States) Candice Lewis-Carter	(Brazil) Angelica Teixeira	(Libya) Kamal Elgargni	(United States) Shanique Grant	(United States) Andre Ferguson	(United States) Breon Ansley
2019	(United States) Brandon Curry	(Australia) Joshua Lenartowicz	(Netherlands) William Bonac			Ms. International category not held.			(Canada) Ryall Graber	(United States) Cydney Gillon	(United States) Janet Layug	212 category not held.	(United States) Natalia Abraham Coelho	(United States) Andre Ferguson	(United States) George Peterson
2020	(Netherlands) William Bonac	(United States) Dexter Jackson	(Egypt) Mamdouh Elssbiay			Ms. International category not held.			(United States) Missy Truscott	(Mexico) Natalia Soltero	(Brazil) Elisa Pecini	212 category not held.	(United States) Natalia Abraham Coelho	(United States) Andre Ferguson	(Costa Rica) Alex Cambronero
2021	(United States) Nick Walker	(United States) Iain Valliere	(United States) Steve Kuclo			Ms. International category not held.			(United States) Missy Truscott	Figure International category not held.	(Canada) Jennifer Dorie	212 category not held.	Women's Physique category not held.	Men's Physique category not held.	(United States) Terrence Ruffin
2022	(United States) Brandon Curry	(Netherlands) William Bonac	(United States) Steve Kuclo		(United States) Ariel Khadr	Ms. International category not held.			(United States) Cydney Gillon	(Canada) Lauralie Chapados	(United States) Erin Banks	212 category not held.	Women's Physique category not held.		(United States) Terrence Ruffin
2023	(United Kingdom) Samson Dauda	(United Arab Emirates) Andrew Jacked	(United States) Nick Walker		(United States) Ariel Khadr	Ms. International category not held.				(Canada) Lauralie Chapados	(United States) Erin Banks		Women's Physique category not held.	(United States) Ariel Khadr	(Brazil) Ramon Dino
2024	(Iran) Hadi Choopan	(United Kingdom) Samson Dauda	(Brazil) Rafael Brandão		(United States) Ariel Khadr	Ms. International category not held.				(Canada) Lauralie Chapados					(Netherlands) Wesley Vissers
2025	(United States) Derek Lunsford	(United Kingdom) Samson Dauda	(United Arab Emirates) Andrew Jacked			Ms. International category not held.									(Germany) Mike Sommerfeld
2026	(United Arab Emirates) Andrew Jacked	(United Arab Emirates) Andrew Jacked	(United States) Nick Walker			Ms. International category not held.			(United Kingdom) Michelle Fredua-Mensah		(United States) Aimee Delgado			(United States) Brandon Hendrickson	(Netherlands) Wesley Vissers

== Arnold Classic International ==
Arnold Classic branding is also used for:

- Arnold Classic Europe in Spain (since 2011)
- Arnold Classic South America in Brazil (since 2013)
- Arnold Classic Australia in Australia (since 2015)
- Arnold Classic Africa in South Africa (since 2016)
- Arnold Classic Asia in Hong Kong (only 2016)
- Arnold Classic UK in England (since 2021)
- Arnold Classic Russia in Russia

=== Winners ===
Year	Europe	South America	Australia	Africa	Asia	UK
2011	(Dominican Republic) Victor Martinez	Event not held.	Event not held.	Event not held.	Event not held.	Event not held.
2012	(Jamaica) Shawn Rhoden	Event not held.	Event not held.	Event not held.	Event not held.	Event not held.
2013	(United States) Phil Heath	(United States) Brandon Curry	Event not held.	Event not held.	Event not held.	Event not held.
2014	(Germany) Dennis Wolf	(United States) Steve Kuclo	Event not held.	Event not held.	Event not held.	Event not held.
2015	(United States) Dexter Jackson	(Egypt) Mamdouh Elssbiay	(United States) Dexter Jackson	Event not held.	Event not held.	Event not held.
2016	(United States) Dexter Jackson	(United States) Kai Greene	(United States) Kai Greene	(United States) Dexter Jackson	(United States) Justin Compton	Event not held.
2017	(Egypt) Mamdouh Elssbiay	(Czech Republic) Lukas Osladil	(United States) Brandon Curry	(United States) Johnnie O. Jackson	Event not held.	Event not held.
2018	(Slovakia) Michal Krizanek	(Brazil) Marcelo da Cruz	(Curaçao) Roelly Winklaar	(Czech Republic) Tomas Kaspar	Event not held.	Event not held.
2019	(Slovakia) Michal Krizanek	(United States) Juan Morel	(Netherlands) William Bonac	(Slovakia) Michal Krizanek	Event not held.	Event not held.
2020	Event not held.					
2021	(Slovakia) Michal Krizanek					(United Kingdom) Nathan De Asha

== See also ==
- Statue of Arnold Schwarzenegger
- Arnold Strongman Classic
- Ms. International
- Rogue Invitational
