= Andrew Jacked =

Nigerian bodybuilder (born 1984)

- Born: Chinedu Andrew Obiekea; 1984 (age 41–42); Kaduna, Nigeria
- Other name: Nuestro hombre el chaquetas The Mona Lisa
- Occupations: Bodybuilder and fitness influencer
- Height: 189 cm (6 ft 2 in)

Chinedu Andrew Obiekea (born 1984), better known as Andrew Jacked, is a Nigerian-French professional bodybuilder who competes under the flag of the United Arab Emirates in the men's open bodybuilding division in the IFBB Pro League. Residing in Dubai, UAE, Obiekea first rose to prominence training with powerlifter Larry Wheels.

== Early life and amateur career ==
Obiekea was born in Kaduna, Nigeria, in 1984, where he completed his education in engineering, working in various fields as an electrical engineer and military officer before switching to sport, first as a kickboxer. He moved to Paris where he continued to train as a gym trainer and gained French citizenship. He later moved to Dubai, where he continued to train at Binous Gym. Obiekea first came to prominence in 2019 as the training partner of American fitness influencer and powerlifter, Larry "Wheels" Williams. In 2021, Obiekea competed in the inaugural EBBF Ajman Bodybuilding and Physique Contest, held in the United Arab Emirates. He won first place in the competition, thereby earning an IFBB Elite Pro card at his debut bodybuilding show.

== Professional career ==
The Nigerian bodybuilder won another IFBB Elite Pro League (IFBB) show just one week later. He switched to the IFBB Pro League and participated in the 2022 Arnold Classic Amateur. Another win at the show earned him the IFBB Pro card. Former competitors such as Jay Cutler, Chris Cormier, and Milos Sarcev predicted Obiekea to rise.

On August 14, 2022, Andrew Jacked competed in and won the Texas Pro bodybuilding competition, qualifying for the Mr. Olympia contest.

Andrew Jacked grew from 260 lbs at his Arnold Classic debut to 290 lbs at the 2022 Mr. Olympia. He placed eighth in the Men's Open division, ahead of top contender William Bonac as well as fellow debutantes Michael Krizanek and Blessing Awodibu.

He won the 2023 Texas Pro in Arlington, Texas.

In March 2026, Jacked took first place as the overall winner in the prestigious professional competition, the Arnold Classic, edging out Nick Walker and Hadi Choopan in 2nd and 3rd place respectively. For his win, Jacked was awarded $760,000 in prize money.

== Profile ==
Obiekea is known in the sport for his aesthetic physique which stands out from the larger and blockier mass physiques that have traditionally dominated the sport since the 1990s. At 6'2" and 290 lbs in the off season, he stands taller than most competitors, yet has chosen to present a more aesthetic look which he often presented through well choreographed posing routines that reminded many of the late Cedric McMillan as well as the bodybuilders from the 1980s—a distinct contrast to heavyweight bodybuilders like Ronnie Coleman or Big Ramy Obiekea credits his relatively small waistline to dietary restrictions and food intolerances that limit him to about four meals and a shake per day.

== Personal life ==
Andrew Jacked currently resides in Dubai, training at Binous Gym. As of 2026, he now resides in the Tampa Bay area during pre-contest for his North American shows, training with Kamal El-Gargni, former Libyan-British bodybuilder.

== Competition history ==
- 2021 EBBF Ajman Bodybuilding and Physique Contest – 1st (earned the IFBB Elite Pro Card)
- 2021 IFBB Elite Pro League Show – 1st
- 2022 Arnold Classic Amateur – 1st (earned the IFBB Pro Card)
- 2022 Texas Pro – 1st (2022 Olympia Qualifier)
- 2022 Arnold Classic UK – 1st
- 2022 Mr. Olympia – 8th
- 2023 Arnold Classic – 3rd
- 2023 Texas Pro – 1st (2023 Mr. Olympia qualifier)
- 2023 Mr. Olympia – 5th
- 2024 Texas Pro – 1st (2024 Mr. Olympia qualifier)
- 2024 Mr. Olympia – 5th
- 2025 Arnold Classic – 3rd
- 2025 Fibo Pro – 1st (2025 Mr. Olympia qualifier)
- 2025 Mr. Olympia – 3rd
- 2025 Romania Muscle Fest Pro – 1st
- 2026 Arnold Classic – 1st
- 2026 Arnold Classic UK – 1st
- 2026 Mr. Olympia – 4th

== See also ==
- 2023 Mr. Olympia
- 2022 Mr. Olympia
- Mamdouh Elssbiay
- Cedric McMillan
