= 2026 Mr. Olympia =

Bodybuilding competition held in Las Vegas, USA

- Genre: Professional bodybuilding competition
- Begins: September 24, 2026
- Ends: September 27, 2026
- Venue: Orleans Arena
- Locations: Las Vegas, Nevada
- Country: United States
- Previous event: 2025 Mr. Olympia
- Next event: 2027 Mr. Olympia
- Organizer: IFBB
- Website: mrolympia.com

The 2026 Mr. Olympia contest was an IFBB professional bodybuilding competition and expo held from September 24–27, 2026, in Las Vegas, Nevada. The Friday and Saturday evening finals were held at Orleans Arena, while the Olympia World Fitness Expo and prejudging were held at the Las Vegas Convention Center. It was the 62nd Mr. Olympia competition held. Other events at the exhibition included the 2026 212 Olympia, Classic Physique Olympia, Men's Physique Olympia, 2026 Ms. Olympia, Fitness Olympia, 2026 Figure Olympia, 2026 Bikini Olympia, Women's Physique Olympia, Wellness Olympia, Wheelchair Olympia, and Fit Model Olympia.

== Venue ==
The 2026 Mr. Olympia was held in Las Vegas, Nevada. The Olympia finals were held at Orleans Arena, while the Olympia World Fitness Expo and prejudging took place at the Las Vegas Convention Center.

== Results ==
Nick Walker won the 62nd edition of the Mr. Olympia Men's Open competition in 2026, with a prize of $600,000, earning his first Mr. Olympia title. Samson Dauda came in second, with a prize of $200,000, while Derek Lunsford finished third.

Table key

Winner
Runner-Up
Third place

Place	Prize	Name	Country	Judging	Finals	Total
1	$600,000	Nick Walker	United States	8	10	18
2	$250,000	Samson Dauda	United Kingdom	15	5	20
3	$100,000	Derek Lunsford	United States	9	15	24
4	$40,000	Andrew Jacked	United Arab Emirates	20	20	40
5	$30,000	Tonio Burton	United States	25	25	50
6		Michal Krizanek	Slovakia	30	34	64
7		Regan Grimes	Canada	36	41	77
8		Behrooz Tabani Abarghani	Iran	49	33	82
9		Brandon Curry	United States	40	49	89
10		James Hollingshead	United Kingdom	55	45	100
11		Jordan Hutchinson	United States	46	55	101
12		Martin Fitzwater	United States	59	60	119
13		Leandro Sencini Peres	Brazil	75	66	141
14		Edward Kargbo	United Arab Emirates	65	78	143
15		Sasan Heirati	United Kingdom	80	69	149
16		Mohamed Foda	United Arab Emirates	70	80	150
16		William Bonac	Netherlands	80	76	156
16		Quinton Eriya	Canada	80	80	160
16		Damian Kuffel	Poland	80	80	160
16		Sergei Danilov	Russia	80	80	160
16		Patrick Moore	United States	80	80	160
16		Andrea Presti	Italy	80	80	160

== 2026 Men's 212 Results ==
Keone Pearson won the Men's 212 competition, earning his fourth consecutive Mr. Olympia 212 title. Lucas Garcia finished second, while Shaun Clarida finished third.

Table key

Winner
Runner-Up
Third place

Place	Prize	Name	Country	Judging	Total
1	$50,000	Keone Pearson	United States	5	5
2	$20,000	Lucas Garcia	Brazil	10	10
3	$12,000	Shaun Clarida	United States	17	17
4	$7,000	Vitor Alves Porto De Oliveira	Brazil	18	18
5	$6,000	Nihat Kaya	Turkey	26	26
6		Felipe Moraes	Brazil	29	29
7		Naotaka Yokokawa	Japan	35	35
8		Nasser Mohammad	Kuwait	40	40
9		Cameron George	Australia	46	46
10		Radoslav Angelov	Bulgaria	50	50
11		Esteban Fuquene	Colombia	55	55
12		Juan Aleman	Mexico	60	60
13		Breon Ansley	United States	67	67
14		Andrey Pereira	Brazil	69	69
15		Angel Calderon Frias	Spain	75	75
16		Michael Condell	United States	80	80
16		Felipe Isaac Fierro Lobos	Chile	80	80
16		Zhaofeng He	China	80	80
16		Ching Chieh Lin	Taiwan	80	80
16		Yinka Majolagbe	United Kingdom	80	80

== 2026 Classic Physique Results ==
Niall Darwen won the Classic Physique competition, earning his first Mr. Olympia title. [Mike Sommerfeld] finished second, while Ramon Rocha Queiroz finished third.

Table key

Winner
Runner-Up
Third place

Place	Prize	Name	Country	Judging	Total
1	$100,000	Niall Darwen	United Kingdom	7	7
2	$40,000	Mike Sommerfeld	Germany	10	10
3	$20,000	Ramon Rocha Queiroz	Brazil	14	14
4	$10,000	Wesley Vissers	Netherlands	21	21
5	$6,000	Terrence Ruffin	United States	24	24
6		Piotr Wojtowicz	Poland	30	30
7		Anton Ratushnyi	United States	35	35
8		Diego Alejandro Galindo Garavito	Colombia	40	40
9		Fabio Junio	Brazil	47	47
10		Andrea Mammoli	Italy	50	50
11		Luca Reger	Germany	54	54
12		Chen Kang	China	60	60
13		Tom Stanley	Australia	67	67
14		Jaehun Park	South Korea	68	68
15		Murat Can Karahasanlar	Turkey	75	75
16		Kyrylo Khudaiev	Ukraine	79	79
16		David Aguilar Rosales	United States	80	80
16		Mohammad Ali	Austria	80	80
16		Abdullah Alrabiah	Saudi Arabia	80	80
16		Eric Brown Jr.	United States	80	80
16		Joaquim Camps Angel	Spain	80	80
16		Cezar Falcao	Brazil	80	80
16		Ethan Gohari	Australia	80	80
16		Matthew Greggo	United States	80	80
16		Seungchan Hong	South Korea	80	80
16		Tae Min Jung	South Korea	80	80
16		Kai Liu	China	80	80
16		Ferran Minana Ibanez	Spain	80	80
16		Richard Nagy	Hungary	80	80
16		Prosper Nwafor	United Kingdom	80	80
16		Samuel Paquin	Canada	80	80
16		Andy Paredes	United States	80	80
16		German Pastor	Spain	80	80
16		Zhivko Petkov	Bulgaria	80	80
16		Jordan Plantiko	United States	80	80
16		Shuai Ren	China	80	80
16		Tomislav Strmecki	Croatia	80	80
16		Paulin Tsamezeu	United States	80	80
16		Luis Roberto Valenzuela Ramos	Mexico	80	80
16		Kellen Wilson	Canada	80	80
16		Gabriel Zancanelli	Brazil	80	80

== See also ==
- Ms. Olympia
