= Statue of Arnold Schwarzenegger =

Statue in Columbus, Ohio, U.S.

- Medium: Bronze sculpture
- Subject: Arnold Schwarzenegger
- Dimensions: 2.4 m (8 ft)
- Location: Columbus, Ohio, U.S.; 39°58′20″N 83°00′08″W

The statue of Arnold Schwarzenegger is an 8-foot-tall (2.4 m), 600 lb (272 kg) bronze sculpture of bodybuilding legend Arnold Schwarzenegger performing his signature 'twisted double biceps pose'. It is installed in Columbus, Ohio, United States and was donated by Robert M. Goldman on behalf of the International Sports Hall of Fame. The statue was designed by the California based sculptor Ralph Crawford.

== History ==
The statue was originally installed in 2012 outside the Franklin County Veterans Memorial auditorium, the venue of the 1970 Mr. World competition, where the 23-year-old Schwarzenegger defeated the reigning world champion Sergio Oliva. In 2014, it was relocated and rededicated outside the Greater Columbus Convention Center, the home of the annual Arnold Sports Festival. Schwarzenegger, Governor John Kasich, and Columbus Mayor Michael B. Coleman attended the ceremony.

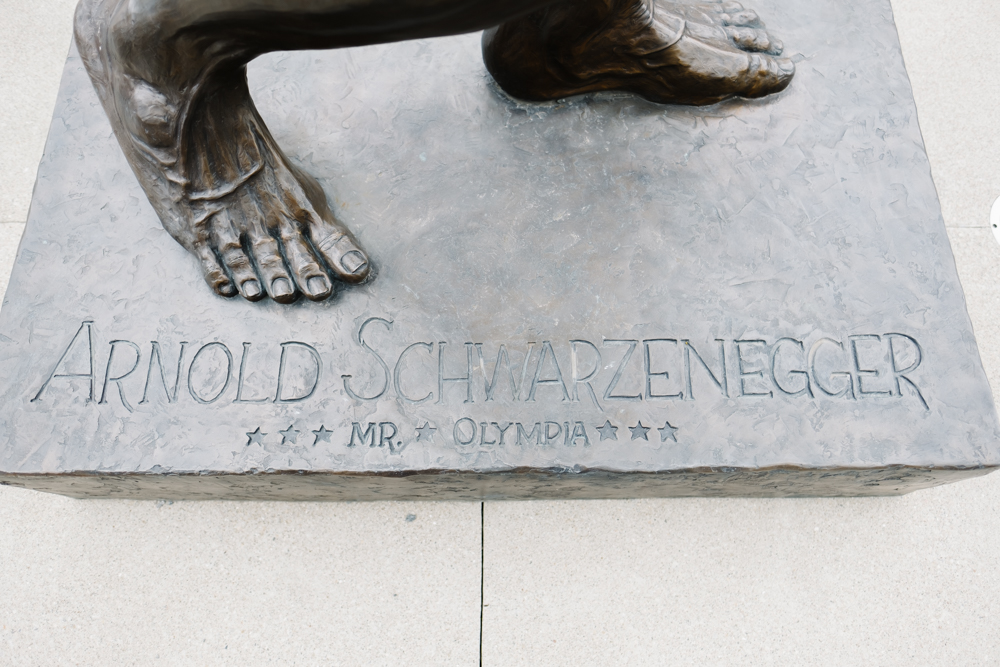
Inscription

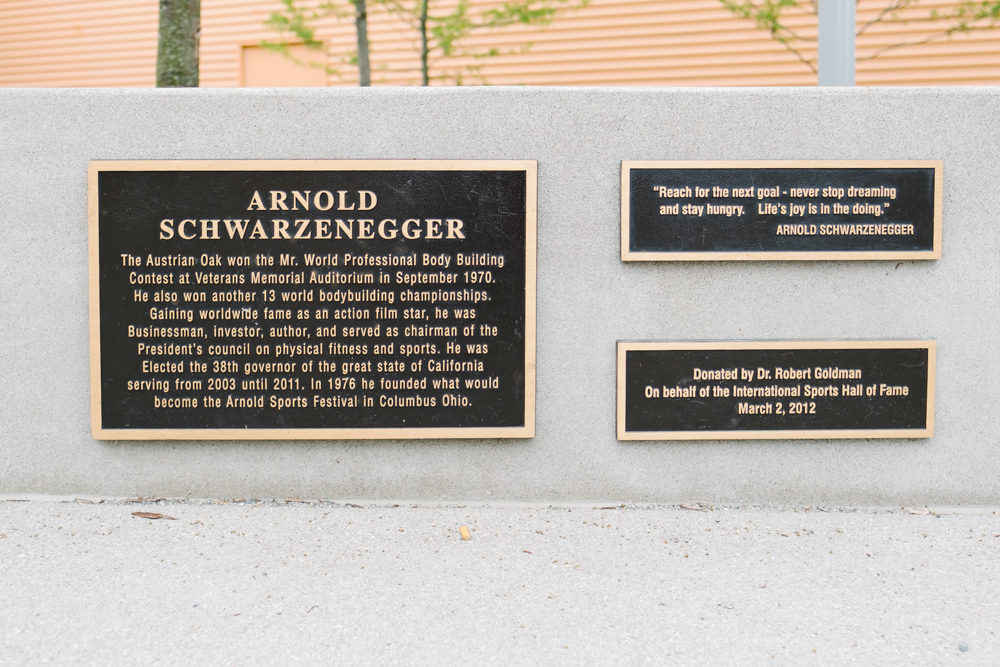
Plaques by the statue

== See also ==
- Arnold Sports Festival, an event hosted at the convention center
