= Mamdouh Elssbiay =

Egyptian IFBB professional bodybuilder

- ممدوح محمد حسن السبيعي
- Professional bodybuilder
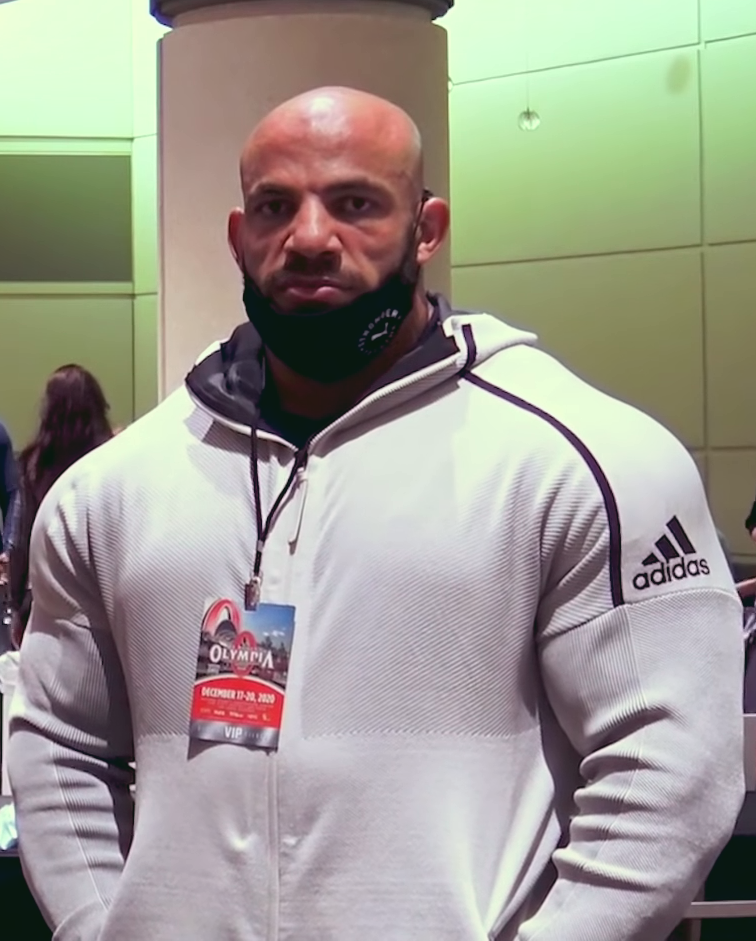
- Elssbiay in December 2020

Personal info
- Nickname: Big Ramy
- Born: September 16, 1984 (age 41); Kafr El Sheikh, Egypt

Best statistics
- Height: 5 ft 9 in (1.75 m)
- Weight: Contest: 295 lb (134 kg); Off season: 310 lb (141 kg)

Professional (Pro) career
- Pro-debut: IFBB New York Pro; 2013
- Best win: IFBB Mr. Olympia; 2020 2021
- Predecessor: Brandon Curry
- Successor: Hadi Choopan
Medal record
Men's bodybuilding
IFBB Mr. Olympia
8th	2013 Mr. Olympia	Men's Open
7th	2014 Mr. Olympia	Men's Open
5th	2015 Mr. Olympia	Men's Open
4th	2016 Mr. Olympia	Men's Open
2nd	2017 Mr. Olympia	Men's Open
6th	2018 Mr. Olympia	Men's Open
1st	2020 Mr. Olympia	Men's Open
1st	2021 Mr. Olympia	Men's Open
5th	2022 Mr. Olympia	Men's Open
Other IFBB Pro contests
1st	2013 New York Pro	Men's Open
1st	2014 New York Pro	Men's Open
1st	2015 Arnold Classic Brazil	Men's Open
1st	2016 Kuwait Pro	Men's Open

Mamdouh Mohammed Hassan Elssbiay (Arabic: ممدوح محمد حسن السبيعي; born 16 September 1984), also known as Big Ramy, is an Egyptian retired professional bodybuilder who competed in the men's open bodybuilding division inside the IFBB Pro League. Known for his size and conditioning during competitions. Elssbiay is a two time Mr. Olympia champion, by winning back-to-back in the years 2020, and 2021. He is known for his wide frame and quad development.

Born in Kafr El Sheikh, Elssbiay started to train professionally as a bodybuilder in 2009 after moving to Kuwait. He eventually earned his pro card by winning the overall title at the 2012 Amateur Olympia in Kuwait City. In 2013, he made his IFBB Pro-debut at the New York Pro, which he won. He won the Arnold Classic Brazil in 2015, becoming the first Egyptian to win the title. In 2020, he became the first Egyptian bodybuilder to win the Mr. Olympia title, the second Middle Eastern bodybuilder to win after Lebanese Samir Bannout in 1983, and the first non-American since British champion Dorian Yates in 1997.

Outside his competitive bodybuilding career, Elssbiay is involved in several business ventures as an athlete and entrepreneur. After several years of representing multiple supplement companies, he started his own brand, Red Rex, in 2022, and has worked as a show promoter.

== Early life ==
Mamdouh Mohammed Hassan Elssbiay was born on 16 September 1984 in Al-Sebea, a town in Kafr El Sheikh, Egypt. He worked as a fisherman before moving to Kuwait, where he started to train professionally in Kuwait City in 2009.

== Bodybuilding career ==
Elssbiay earned his pro card by winning the overall title at the 2012 Amateur Olympia in Kuwait City. In 2010, he joined Oxygen Gym in Kuwait. By 2011, he weighed 200 lbs, and when he stepped on the 2012 Amateur Olympia Kuwait stage, he weighed in at 286 lbs and was declared the champion. In 2013, Elssbiay made his IFBB Pro-debut at the New York Pro, which he won. In 2020 and 2021, he won the Mr. Olympia contest.

== Personal life ==
In October 2020, Elssbiay tested positive for COVID-19, preventing him from participating in the 2020 Europa Pro Bodybuilding Championships.

== Competitive history ==
Amateur

- 2012 Kuwait Golden Cup – 1st
- 2012 Amateur Olympia Kuwait – 1st (Earned Pro Card)

Professional

- 2013 New York Pro Championship – 1st
- 2013 Mr. Olympia – 8th
- 2014 New York Pro Championship – 1st
- 2014 Mr. Olympia – 7th
- 2015 Arnold Classic Brazil – 1st
- 2015 Mr. Olympia – 5th
- 2015 Arnold Classic Europe - 4th
- 2015 EVLS Prague Pro – 2nd
- 2016 Mr. Olympia – 4th
- 2016 Arnold Classic Europe – 2nd
- 2016 IFBB Kuwait Pro – 1st
- 2016 EVLS Prague Pro – 2nd
- 2017 Mr. Olympia – 2nd
- 2017 Arnold Classic Europe – 1st
- 2018 Mr. Olympia – 6th
- 2020 Arnold Classic – 3rd
- 2020 Mr. Olympia – 1st
- 2021 Mr. Olympia – 1st
- 2022 Mr. Olympia – 5th
- 2023 Arnold Classic – 4th
