= Hossein Karimi (bodybuilder) =

Iranian bodybuilder

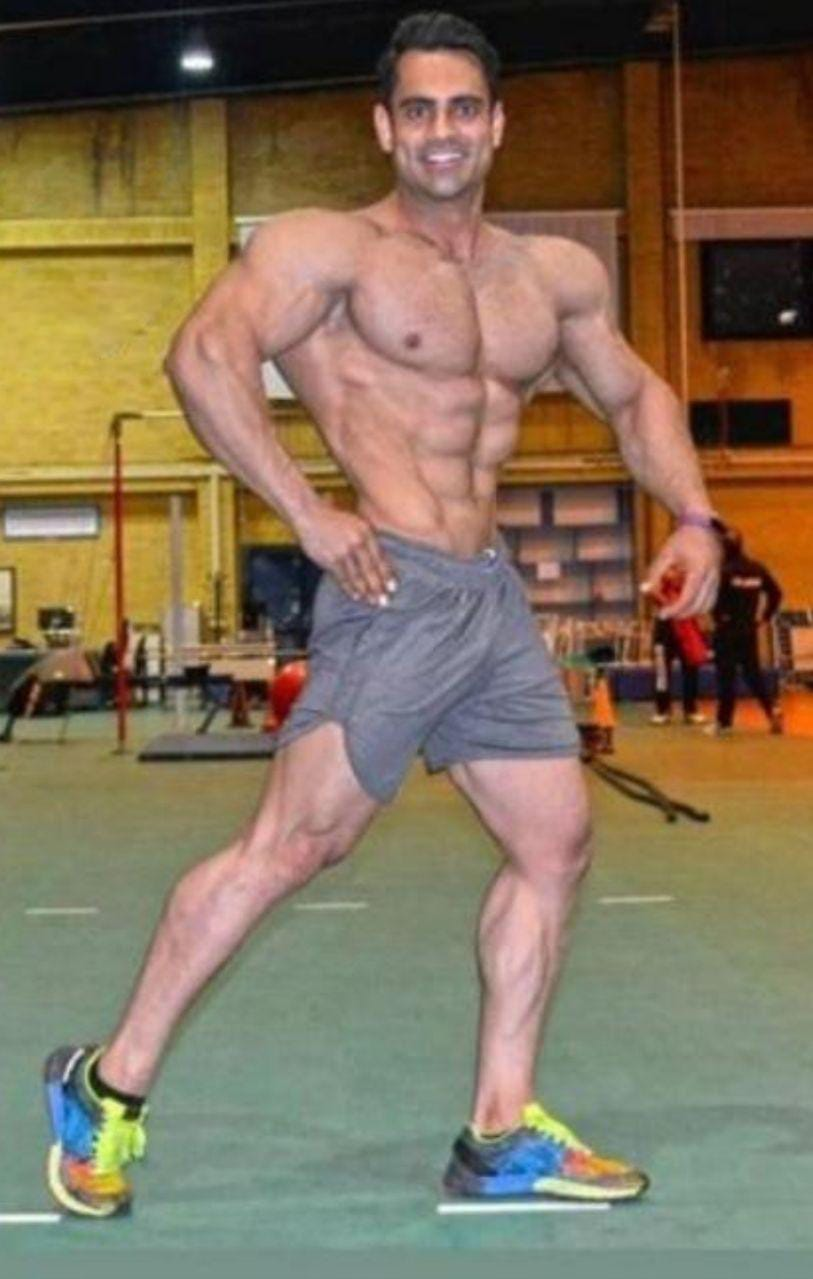

Personal information
- Native name: حسین کریمی
- Nationality: Iranian
- Born: March 25, 1992 (age 34) Ahvaz, Khuzestan Province, Iran
- Height: 1.78 m (5 ft 10 in)
- Weight: 96 kg (212 lb)

Hossein Karimi (born March 25, 1992, in Ahvaz, Khuzestan, Iran) is an Iranian professional bodybuilder and ifbb world champion. He is also the first and only Iranian men's physique athlete in MrOlympia history. He earned his pro card in 2022, and when he won a pro show in March 2022, he got qualified for Olympia in same year.He competed at the Olympia-Las Vegas 2022.

He used to be the champion of three different fields which is powerlifting, bench press, and muscular physique, and also a member of the Islamic Republic of Iran national team in all the three fields. He started bodybuilding since at 13 and also won his first national powerlifting competition championship in 2007. He became a member of the Iran powerlifting national team in 2010 and also increased the world record by 2.5 kilograms in 2013.

He won the championship of Asia Bench Press in 2017 and changed his sport field to muscular physique after three years. He became the finalist of the Diamond Cup of Iran in his first competition in 2018 and also won the championships of Dubai Muscle Beach and Las Vegas competitions of Abu Dhabi in the same year. He became a member of Iran national team in 2019 for the third time and became the champion of IFBB international competition in muscular physique field in that year as the only representative of Iran.

== Accomplishments ==
- Championship of 2007 national powerlifting competition
- Breaking the national bench press record for 5 times
- Championship of national bench press and powerlifting competitions for 8 times
- Becoming a member of powerlifting national team in 2010
- Doing a bench press of 300 kg in international competitions
- Competing in Asia Power competition in 2013 and breaking the world record
- Championship of Asia Bench Press in 2015
- Finalist of Diamond Cup in 2018
- Championship of Dubai Muscle Beach in 2018
- Championship of Las Vegas competitions of Abu Dhabi in 2018
- Becoming a member of muscular physique national team in 2019
- IFBB world championship in 2019
- Championship of Men's Physique NPC Worldwide
- Being the only Iranian world champion in the field of Muscular Physique

== Power lifting ==
Karimi's first professional field was powerlifting, which included many honors, including world record-breaking, national team membership, national team coaching, Asian Championship, and World Championship.

== Bench press ==
Hossein Karimi increased the world bench press record by 2.5 kg in 1392(Solar Hijri), and in the following years he was able to accomplish his best record of 300 kg in the official competitions in the world tournament.

== Muscular Men’s Physique IFBB ==
In 1397(Solar Hijri), Hossein Karimi became the finalist of the Tehran Permanent Cup in his first official match. In the same year, he won the Muscle Beach Dubai and the Las Vegas Abu Dhabi Championships; And in 2019, as the only representative of Iran, he won the IFBB world championship.

== Men's Physique NPC ==
In 2021, Hossein Karimi succeeded to win first place in Class C of the Men's Physique division of the NPC Worldwide Russia competition.

== The national team of the Islamic Republic of Iran ==
Hossein Karimi was invited to the national team of the Islamic Republic of Iran three times in total; First, in 1389(Solar Hijri) in the powerlifting department, in 1392(Solar Hijri) in the bench press department, and in 1398(Solar Hijri) in the muscular physique department.
