= 2022 Mr. Olympia =

Bodybuilding competition held in Las Vegas, USA

- Genre: Professional bodybuilding competition
- Begins: December 16, 2022
- Ends: December 17, 2022
- Venue: Planet Hollywood Las Vegas, Zappos Theater, Las Vegas Convention Center
- Location: Las Vegas, Nevada
- Country: United States
- Previous event: 2021 Mr. Olympia
- Next event: 2023 Mr. Olympia
- Organizer: IFBB

The 2022 Mr. Olympia contest was an IFBB Pro League professional bodybuilding competition and expo held from December 15–18, 2022, at the Planet Hollywood Las Vegas, in Paradise, Nevada. Concurrently, the Olympia fitness expo was held at the Las Vegas Convention Center. It was the 58th Mr. Olympia competition held. Other events at the exhibition included the 2022 212 Olympia Showdown, as well as finals in Men's Classic, Men's Physique, 2022 Ms. Olympia, Fitness, 2022 Figure, 2022 Bikini Olympia, among other contests.

== Venue ==
The Olympia made a return to its traditional hosting venue in Las Vegas, Nevada, after spending two years in Orlando, Florida, due to the onset of the COVID-19 pandemic. Having overcome the challenges of previous years, the event returned to its pre-COVID size with many competitors and fans from across the world in attendance. As in recent years, the show continued to be streamed live to a global audience.

== Results ==
Hadi Choopan won the 58th edition of Mr. Olympia Men's Open competition in 2022, with a prize of $400,000. Derek Lunsford came in second with a prize of $150,000. Ten other winners from multiple divisions were crowned during the two days of division finals, including Chris Bumstead, who won the Classic Physique title for the fourth consecutive time, and Shaun Clarida, who managed to win back the 212 Division title after losing it in 2021.

The 2022 Olympia saw a changing of the guard of sorts as Hadi Choopan beat two-time champion Mamdouh "Big Ramy" Elssbiay to claim his first Olympia title. In addition, newcomers to the Men's Open, such as Derek Lunsford (formerly a 212 competitor) and Andrew Jacked, performed better than longtime stars like William Bonac and Iain Valliere. The competition also saw a much larger field than in the preceding two years thanks to a decline in COVID-19 cases and subsequent restrictions, with competitors hailing from nations as diverse as Ireland, Nigeria, Brazil, and Slovakia.

Table key

Winner
Runner-Up
Third place

Place	Prize	Name	Country	Judging	Finals	Total
1	$400,000	Hadi Choopan	Iran	7	6	13
2	$150,000	Derek Lunsford	United States	8	9	17
3	$100,000	Nick Walker	United States	15	17	32
4	$40,000	Brandon Curry	United States	20	20	40
5	$35,000	Mamdouh Elssbiay	Egypt	25	27	52
6	$25,000	Samson Dauda	United Kingdom	30	28	58
7	$16,000	Hunter Labrada	United States	35	35	70
8	$14,000	Andrew 'Jacked' Chinedu Obiekea	France	40	40	80
9	$12,000	William Bonac	Netherlands	45	46	91
10	$10,000	Rafael Brandao	Brazil	50	50	100
11	$2000	Iain Valliere	Canada	56	57	113
12	$2000	Michal Krizanek	Slovakia	59	58	117
13	$2000	Patrick Johnson	Denmark	67	67	134
14	$2000	Charles Griffen	United States	69	68	137
15	$2000	Justin Rodriguez	United States	75	77	152
16		James Hollingshead	United Kingdom	80	79	159
16		Mohammad Alnsoor	Jordan	80	80	160
16		Blessing Awodibu	Ireland	80	80	160
16		Vitor Boff	Brazil	80	80	160
16		Tonio Burton	United States	80	80	160
16		Theo Leguerrier	France	80	80	160
16		Andrea Muzi	Italy	80	80	160
16		Andrea Presti	Italy	80	80	160
16		Mohamed Shaaban	Egypt	80	80	160
16		Vladyslav Sukhoruchko	Ukraine	80	80	160
16		Joel Thomas	United States	80	80	160
16		Antoine Vaillant	Canada	80	80	160
16		Akim Williams	United States	80	80	160

== Aftermath ==
The 2022 Mr Olympia saw a record number of competitors in the open category, 28, which led to almost half of all competitors placing in the unranked 16th place. As a result the IFBB announced that to qualify for ongoing Mr. Olympia finals, competitors must win at least one professional show, ending the points qualification system.

Additionally as a result of the large number of finalists, the finals witnessed significant time overruns with the Open finals ending at 1 am local time, due to the many competitors in each division. This led to significant complaints by coaches such as Chris Aceto as well as complaints over crowding backstage and a lack of professionalism by competitors and commentators such as Jay Cutler and James Hollingshead.
