= Abnow, Fars =

Abnow ابنو
- Village
- Location within Iran
- Coordinates: 30°08′07″N 52°09′22″E
- Country: Iran
- Province: Fars
- County: Sepidan
- Bakhsh: Hamaijan
- Rural District: Hamaijan

Population (2006)
  - Total: 1,196
- Time zone: UTC+3:30 (IRST)
  - Summer (DST): UTC+4:30 (IRDT)

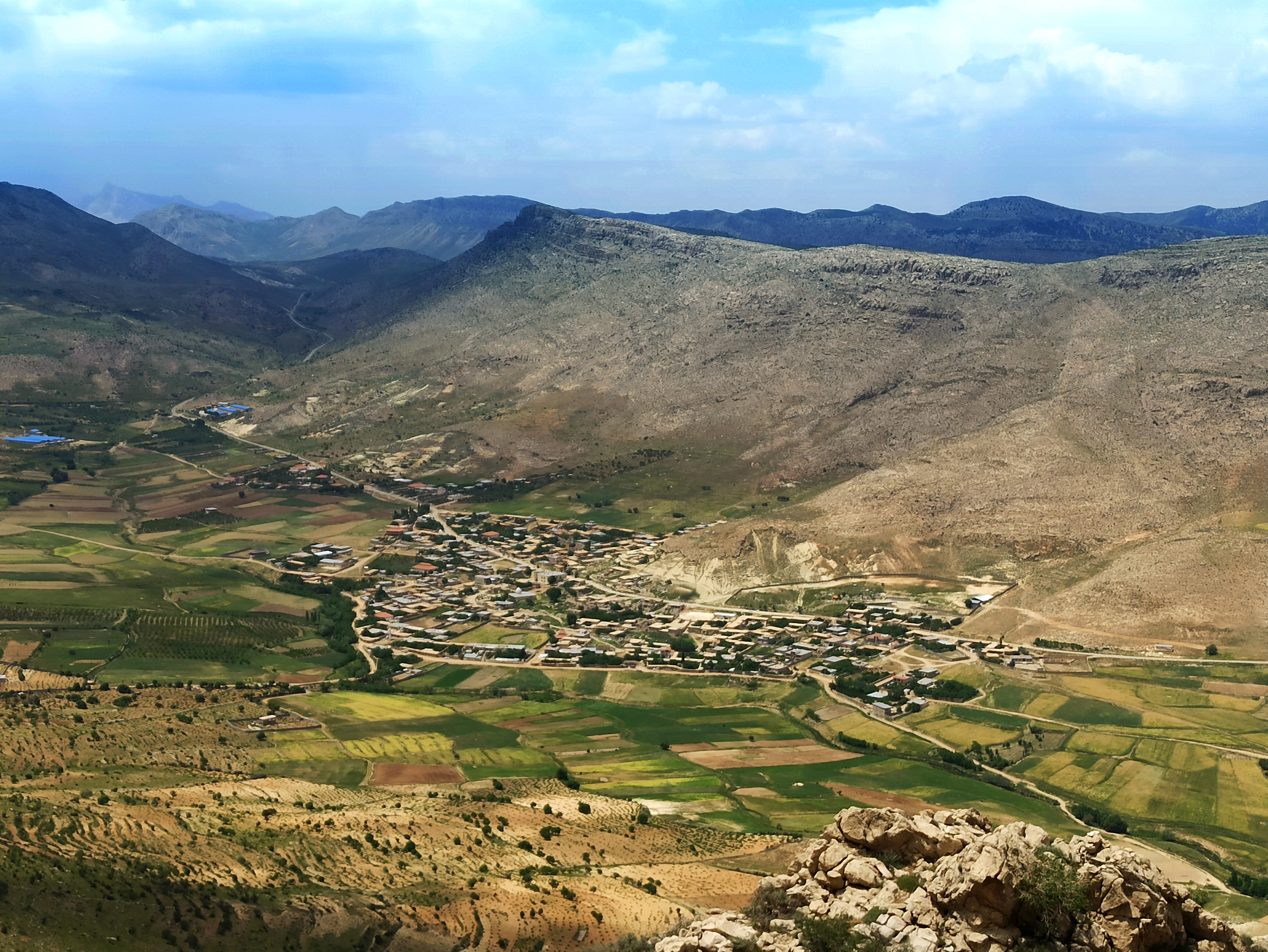

Abnow (Persian: ابنو, also Romanized as Abnow and Ābnū; also known as Abnūh) is a village in Hamaijan Rural District, Hamaijan District, Sepidan County, Fars province, Iran. At the 2006 census, its population was 1,196, in 278 families.
