= 2023 Mr. Olympia =

Bodybuilding competition held in Las Vegas, USA

- Genre: Professional bodybuilding competition
- Begins: November 3, 2023
- Ends: November 4, 2023
- Venue: Orange County Convention Center
- Location: Orlando, Florida
- Country: United States
- Previous event: 2022 Mr. Olympia
- Next event: 2024 Mr. Olympia
- Organizer: IFBB

The 2023 Mr. Olympia contest was an IFBB Pro League professional bodybuilding competition and expo held from November 2–5, 2023, at the Orange County Convention Center, in Orlando, Florida. It was the 59th Mr. Olympia competition held. Other events at the exhibition included the 2023 212 Olympia Showdown, as well as finals in Men's Classic, Men's Physique, 2023 Ms. Olympia, Fitness, 2023 Figure, 2023 Bikini Olympia, among other contests.

== Venue ==
In 2023, the Mr. Olympia competition once again found its home in Orlando, Florida. However, the previous year saw a shift from tradition as it returned to its traditional hosting venue in Las Vegas, Nevada. This change marked a significant moment for the event, which had spent the prior two years in Orlando, Florida, as a response to the onset of the COVID-19 pandemic. Despite the challenges faced during that period, the Olympia has successfully regained its pre-COVID size, drawing numerous competitors and fans from all corners of the globe. The continued global appeal of the event was evident as it maintained its practice of live streaming, allowing a worldwide audience to witness the pinnacle of bodybuilding excellence.

== Results ==
Derek Lunsford won the 59th edition of Mr. Olympia Men's Open competition in 2023, with a prize of $400,000. Hadi Choopan came in second with a prize of $150,000. Ten other winners from multiple divisions were crowned during the two days of division finals, including Chris Bumstead, who won the Classic Physique title for the fifth consecutive time.

Table key

Winner
Runner-Up
Third place
Disqualified or withdrawn

| Place | Prize | Name | Country | Judging | Finals | Total |
|---|---|---|---|---|---|---|
| 1 | $400,000 | Derek Lunsford | United States | 7 | 6 | 13 |
| 2 | $150,000 | Hadi Choopan | Iran | 9 | 9 | 18 |
| 3 | $100,000 | Samson Dauda | United Kingdom | 13 | 15 | 28 |
| 4 | $40,000 | Brandon Curry | United States | 21 | 20 | 41 |
| 5 | $35,000 | Andrew 'Jacked' Chinedu Obiekea | France | 24 | 27 | 51 |
| 6 | $25,000 | Hunter Labrada | United States | 30 | 28 | 58 |
| 7 | $16,000 | Michal Krizanek | Slovakia | 35 | 35 | 70 |
| 8 | $14,000 | Tonio Burton | United States | 42 | 40 | 82 |
| 9 | $12,000 | Regan Grimes | Canada | 43 | 45 | 88 |
| 10 | $10,000 | Charles Griffen | United States | 53 | 51 | 104 |
| 11 | $2,000 | Hassan Mostafa | Egypt | 52 | 57 | 109 |
| 12 | $2,000 | Andrea Presti | Italy | 61 | 58 | 119 |
| 13 | $2,000 | Theo Leguerrier | France | 65 | 65 | 130 |
| 14 | $2,000 | Roman Fritz | Germany | 70 | 70 | 140 |
| 15 | $2,000 | Justin Shier | United States | 80 | 75 | 155 |
| 16 | $2,000 | Phil Clahar | United States | 80 | 80 | 160 |
| — | ~~Ross Flanigan~~ | ~~United States~~ | ~~75~~ | — | — | |

== Lead-Up ==
Days before the competition, 2022 3rd Place Winner, Nick Walker, was forced to withdrawal due to an injury (torn hamstring).
