= 2020 Mr. Olympia =

IFBB professional bodybuilding competition

- Genre: Professional bodybuilding competition
- Country: United States
- Previous event: 2019 Mr. Olympia
- Next event: 2021 Mr. Olympia
- Organizer: IFBB Pro League
- People: Mr. Olympia : Mamdouh "Big Ramy" Elssbiay 212 Olympia: Shaun Clarida; Bikini Olympia: Janet Layug; CP Olympia: Chris Bumstead; MP Olympia: Brandon Hendrickson; WP Olympia: Sarah Villegas; Fitness Olympia: Missy Truscott Figure Olympia: Cydney Gillon
- Website: https://mrolympia.com/mr-olympia

The 2020 Mr. Olympia contest was a weekend-long IFBB Pro League professional bodybuilding competition that was held on December 15 to 20, 2020, in Orlando, Florida. Initially meant to be held at the Planet Hollywood Las Vegas, the tournament was later moved to Orlando, due to local restrictions in the wake of the COVID-19 pandemic, making it the first Olympia to be held outside Las Vegas in two decades.

This was the 56th Mr. Olympia competition celebrated. The weekend competition is also known as the Joe Weider's Olympia Fitness and Performance Weekend. While the main event was the competition for the title of Mr. Olympia, several other events were held which includes the Amateur competition and fan pavilion.

== Timeline of events ==
- On December 17, 2020, the competitors press conference was held.
- On December 18, 2020, prejudging and finals for Fitness Olympia, Figure Olympia and Classic Physique were held. Mr. Olympia pre-judging was also held on the same night.
- On December 19, 2020, the Men's Physique Olympia and Women's Physique Olympia judging and finals were held in the morning at Las Vegas Convention Center. At night, the Bikini Olympia, 212 Olympia and Mr. Olympia finals were held at Orleans Arena.
- On December 20, 2020, an Olympia Superstar Seminar was held.

== Venue ==
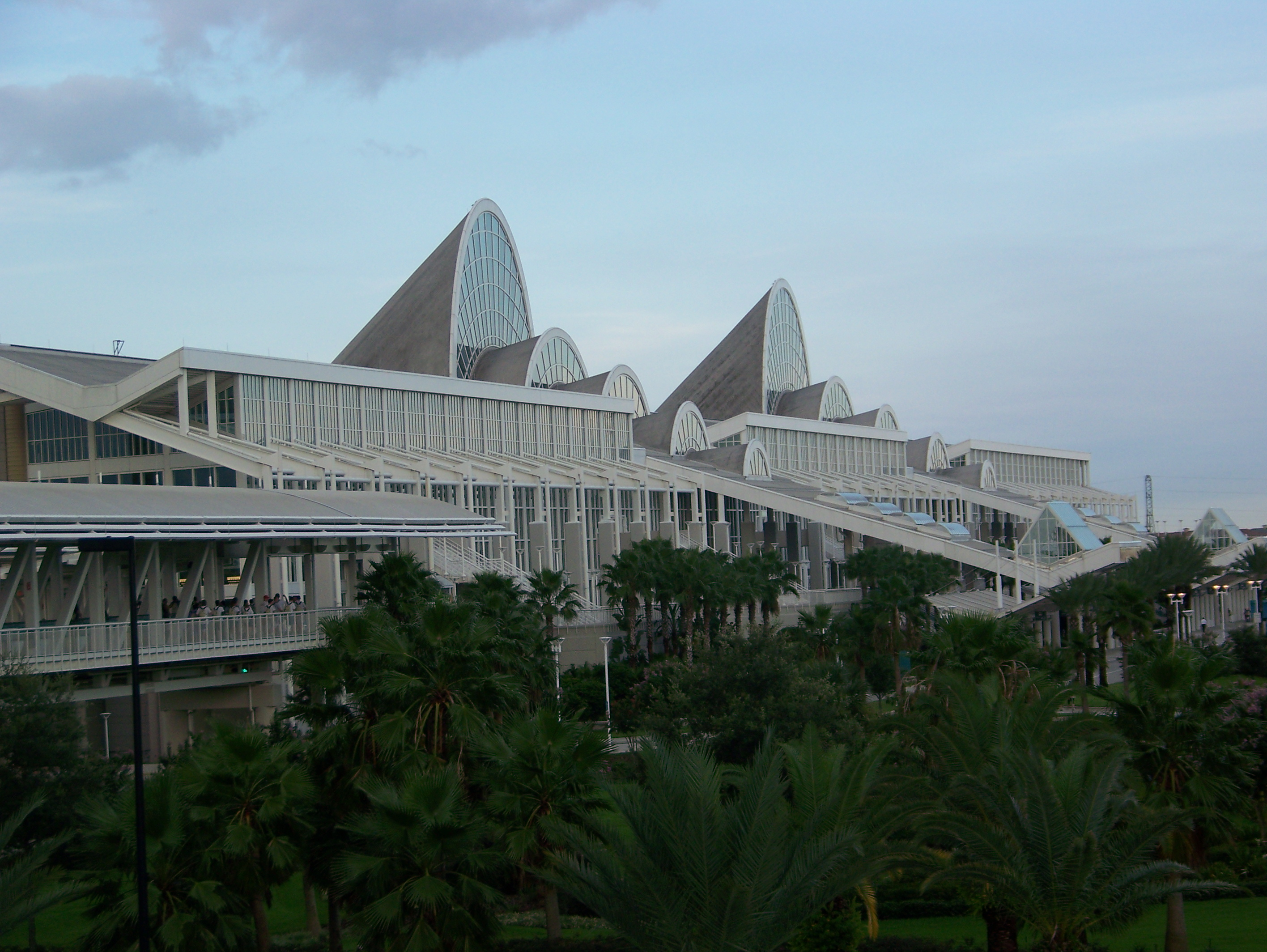
Orlando, Florida, played host to the Olympia for the second time (the first was 1991).

The Orange County Convention Center in Orlando, Florida was the host building for the crowning of multiple world champions in bodybuilding and fitness. Due to the challenges of the pandemic, the organizers served the 2020 Olympia, as a celebration of overcoming numerous forms of adversity to reach the pinnacle in fitness. Among those present was Honorary Olympia ambassador Shaquille O'Neal, who hailed the competitors at the Olympia some of "the greatest athletes in the world". As in recent years, the show was streamed live to a global audience.

== Results ==
Mamdouh "Big Ramy" Elssbiay won his first Mr Olympia title. Phil Heath returned to the Mr Olympia stage, but was not able to regain the title. The former Mr Olympia 2019 Brandon Curry came in 2nd Place.

Hadi Choopan came in fourth, but placed 2nd at the finals.

=== Mr. Olympia results ===
Place	Prize	Name	Country	Judging	Finals	Total
1	$400,000	Mamdouh Elssbiay	(Egypt)	8	5	13
2	$150,000	Brandon Curry	(United States)	13	15	28
3	$100,000	Phil Heath	(United States)	11	20	31
4	$55,000	Hadi Choopan	(Iran)	22	10	32
5	$45,000	William Bonac	(Netherlands)	23	25	48
6		Akim Williams	(United States)	30	30	60
7		Iain Valliere	(Canada)	38	35	73
8		Hunter Labrada	(United States)	38	40	78
9		Dexter Jackson	(United States)	46	47	93
10		Justin Luis Rodriguez	(United States)	48	48	96

== Other results ==
- Brandon Hendrickson won the Men's Physique Olympia title for the second time dethroning Raymond Edmonds.
- Sarah Villegas won the Women's Physique Olympia title dethroning, defending champion, Shanique Grant.
- Chris Bumstead won Classic Physique division, thus becoming a two-time Classic Physique Olympia champion
- Missy Truscott won Fitness Olympia title.
- Cydney Gillon won the 2020 Figure Olympia title for the fourth consecutive time.
- Janet Layug won the 2020 Bikini Olympia for the first time.
- Shaun Clarida won the 212 Mr. Olympia.

== Effects of the Covid 19 pandemic ==
The ongoing Covid 19 pandemic greatly affected the Olympia finals, first delaying the show from October to December, then resulting in a change in venue from Las Vegas to Orlando, Florida. Additionally, global travel restrictions and health concerns, led to several competitors dropping out or not making the show, most notably, perennial finalists, Roelly Winklaar, Flex Lewis and Cedric McMillan.

Also former winner Shawn Rhoden, was barred from competing, pending the outcome of his ongoing legal case.

The overall event was largely down sized from its traditional size, with the Fitness Expo, and meet and greets cancelled resulting in a smaller number of sponsors and spectators than in previous years.

== Milestones and records ==
"Big Ramy" emerged victorious and was named the 16th Mr. Olympia. Elssbiay, an Egyptian citizen and Dubai resident, was the first non-American to win the title since British champion, Dorian Yates in 1997. It was also the first time since 1981–84 that there had been four different champions in four consecutive years – Heath won in 2017, Shawn Rhoden won in 2018, Curry in 2019, and then Elssbiay for 2020 and 2021.
