= Jenny Worth =

American fitness and figure competitor

- Professional bodybuilder

Personal info
- Born: Tallahassee, Florida

Best statistics

Professional (Pro) career
- Pro-debut: 1998
- Best win: Fitness International
- Active: Retired 2003

Jenny Worth (born May 6, 1977) is an IFBB fitness & figure competitor from Florida, in the United States. Jenny Worth became a competitive gymnast at the age of 7, and competed until joining the track, cheerleading, cross country running and weight lifting team at Amos P. Godby High School in Tallahassee, Florida. She has the distinction of being the first female member of the weight lifting team, and also was the Senior Homecoming Queen (1995), and was subsequently inducted in the Amos P. Godby Hall of Fame for her accomplishments in the sports arena.

She became an amateur fitness athlete upon graduating high school, and turned pro in 1998. She has worked as a fitness instructor, and personal trainer in Miami with Dodd Romero of Bod by Dodd. In 2010, she moved to the Los Angeles area, where she continues to work as a personal fitness trainer.

== Stats ==
- Height: 5'1"
- Weight: 107 lbs.
- Measurements: 34-27-36

== Competitive history ==
- 2025 Olympia 10th
- 2025 Masters Olympia 1st
- 2024 Night of The Champions 6th
- 2024 Legions Sports Fest 4th
- 2024 Musclecontest Titans 3rd
- 2023 Legions Sport Fest 5th
- 2023 Masters Olympia 4th
- 2020 Arnold Classic 10th
- 2019 Fitness Olympia 9th
- 2019 Tampa Pro 1st Olympia Qualified
- 2018 Legions Sports Fest- 3rd
- 2018 Fitness Olympia-8th
- 2018 Tampa Pro 1st Olympia Qualified
- 2018 Chicago Pro 3rd
- 2018 Miami Pro 3rd
- 2017 Tampa Pro -3rd after a 14 yr break
- 2003 Fitness Olympia - 10th
- 2002 Fitness Olympia - 3rd
- 2002 Show of Strength - 3rd
- 2002 Fitness International - 2nd
- 2001 Fitness International - 1st
- 2001 Fitness Olympia - 2nd
- 2000 Fitness Olympia - 3rd
- 2000 IFBB Jan Tana Classic Pro Fitness-Overall
- 1999 IFBB Fitness Olympia - 9th
- 1999 IFBB Midwest Pro Fitness Classic - 1st
- 1999 IFBB Italian Pro Fitness Classic - 6th
- 1999 IFBB Jan Tana Pro Fitness Classic - 2nd
- 1998 IFBB Fitness Olympia - 10th place
- 1998 IFBB Midwest Pro Fitness - 2nd place
- 1998 IFBB Jan Tana Pro Fitness - 6th place
- 1998 NPC USA Fitness Championships - Overall Short Class (IFBB Professional Qualifier)
- 1998 NPC Florida State Fitness Championships - Overall
- 1997 3rd Annual NPC Debbie Kruck Fitness Classic - Overall
- 1997 NPC Team Universe Fitness Championships - 5th place
- 1997 NPC Women's National Fitness Championships - 14th place
- 1996 NPC Southern USA Fitness Championships - Overall
- 1996 NPC Tallahassee Fitness Championships - Overall
- 1996 NPC Junior National Fitness Championships - 2nd place
- 1996 2nd Annual NPC Debbie Kruck Fitness Classic - 3rd place
- 1996 NPC Women's National Fitness Championships - 14th place
