= Hadi Choopan =

Iranian bodybuilder

- هادی چوپان
- Professional bodybuilder
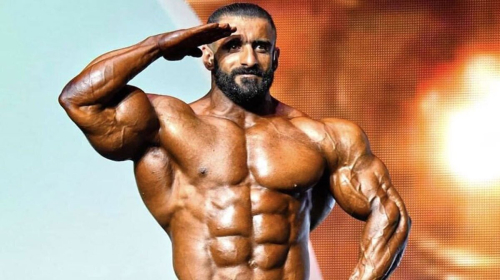
- Hadi Choopan in 2024

Personal info
- Born: September 26, 1987 (age 39); Abnow, Fars province, Iran

Best statistics
- Height: 5 ft 7 in (1.70 m)
- Weight: Contest: 200 lb (91 kg); Off season: 220 lb (100 kg)

Professional (Pro) career
- Best win: 2022 Mr. Olympia, 2024 Arnold Classic
- Predecessor: Mamdouh Elssbiay
- Successor: Derek Lunsford
Medal record
Men's bodybuilding
IFBB Mr. Olympia
3rd	2019 Mr. Olympia	Men's Open
4th	2020 Mr. Olympia	Men's Open
3rd	2021 Mr. Olympia	Men's Open
1st	2022 Mr. Olympia	Men's Open
2nd	2023 Mr. Olympia	Men's Open
2nd	2024 Mr. Olympia	Men's Open
2nd	2025 Mr. Olympia	Men's Open
Other IFBB Pro contests
1st	2018 Portugal Pro	Men's Open
1st	2019 Vancouver Pro	Men's Open
1st	2024 Arnold Classic US	Men's Open
1st	2024 Arnold Classic UK	Men's Open

Hadi Choopan (Persian: هادی چوپان; also Romanized as Hādi Chupān; born September 26, 1987), known by his nickname "The Persian Wolf", is an Iranian professional bodybuilder who competes in the men's open bodybuilding division in the IFBB Pro League. Known for his legs and conditioning, Choopan is a former Mr. Olympia, having won the title in the 2022 Mr. Olympia competition.

Born in Abnow, Fars, Choopan developed an interest in bodybuilding at an early age. In 2005, he won his first national title. He won the WBPF Asia Championships in 2013 and had continued success at the IFBB World Bodybuilding Championships in 2013, 2014, and 2015. He made his Mr. Olympia debut in 2019, placing third and winning the People's Champion Award at the show for the first time. In 2022, he became the first Iranian competitor to win the Mr. Olympia contest. In 2024, he won the Arnold Classic and the Arnold Classic UK.

== Early life ==
Choopan was born in September 1987 in Sepidan County, Fars province, located in the Southern Iran. Choopan hailed from a financially struggling family, that led him to work at an early age, engaging in peddling goods and construction labor.

== Bodybuilding career ==
Despite the demanding work, Choopan developed an interest in bodybuilding at an early age. In 2002, Choopan initiated his training under coach Jamshid Owji, lifting 5 kg weights due to his smaller stature. Over time, he made steady progress. Within three years of pursuing professional bodybuilding, Choopan secured a third-place finish in a national competition and achieved success in local contests within Fars Province. In 2005, he won his first national title, marking his rise in the sport.

In 2013, Choopan's career took a significant step forward when he began training with Ali Ne’mati. His accomplishments included winning the WBPF Asia Championships in 2013 and continued success at the WBPF World Bodybuilding Championships in 2013, 2014, and 2015.

In 2017, he began training with coach Hany Rambod and secured a gold medal at the 2017 Mr. Olympia Amateur. Despite a few setbacks the same year, he gained international recognition as "The Persian Wolf".

Choopan faced difficulties obtaining a U.S. Visa, preventing him from participating in major international events in 2018. However, he successfully resolved these issues in 2019, won the IFBB Vancouver Pro and placed third in his Mr. Olympia debut and won the People's Champion Award at the show.

Choopan went on to take 4th and 3rd places at the show in 2020 and 2021, and won the People's Champion Award for the second time in 2021. In 2022, Choopan won the Mr. Olympia title by defeating 26 competitors and succeeded Big Ramy. However, he lost the title to Derek Lunsford in 2023, taking second place at the show.

During the 2023 Mr Olympia finals, Choopan received both support and criticism from the bodybuilding community. Soon after the reading of the results, Choopan removed his silver second-place medal and walked off stage, which many cited as poor sportsmanship. Following this, much of Choopan's fanbase also received significant criticism for their online vitriol towards Derek Lunsford after his victory, including threats towards Derek's family which Derek himself was forced to address.

== Public image ==
In February 2023, a statue was erected in his name in his home country of Iran.

== Personal life ==
Choopan is married and has three children.

Choopan is a Twelver Shia Muslim and fasts during the month of Ramadan.

He has his own YouTube channel, Hadi Choopan.

== Titles and honors ==
- 15 provincial gold medals (Fars and Tehran provinces)
- 6 national medals (3 golds, 2 silvers, 1 bronze)
- WBPF World Championships: Silver medal, 2012
- WBPF Asia Championships: Gold medal, 2013
- IFBB World Championships: Gold medal, 2013, 2014, 2015
- Mr. Olympia Amateur: Gold medal, 2017
- IFBB Sheru Classic: Silver medal, 2017
- Asia Grand Prix: Silver medal, 2017
- San Marino Pro: Silver medal, 2017
- Dubai Expo: Silver medal, 2018
- IFBB Portugal Pro: Gold medal, 2018
- Asia Grand Prix: Gold medal, 2018
- IFBB Vancouver Pro: Gold medal, 2019
- 2019 Mr. Olympia: 3rd place
- 2020 Mr. Olympia: 4th place
- 2021 Mr. Olympia: 3rd place
- 2022 Mr. Olympia: 1st place
- 2023 Mr. Olympia: 2nd place
- 2024 Arnold Classic: 1st place
- 2024 Arnold Classic UK: 1st place
- 2024 Mr. Olympia: 2nd place
- 2025 Mr. Olympia: 2nd place
- 2026 Arnold Classic: 3rd place
