= 2024 Mr. Olympia =

Bodybuilding competition held in Las Vegas, USA

- Genre: Professional bodybuilding competition
- Begins: October 11, 2024
- Ends: October 12, 2024
- Venue: Resorts World Theatre
- Locations: Las Vegas, Nevada
- Country: United States
- Previous event: 2023 Mr. Olympia
- Next event: 2025 Mr. Olympia
- Organizer: IFBB

The 2024 Mr. Olympia contest was an IFBB professional bodybuilding competition and expo held from October 10–13, 2024, at the Resorts World Las Vegas, in Las Vegas, Nevada. It was the 60th Mr. Olympia competition held. Other events included the 2024 212 Olympia Showdown, as well as finals in Men's Classic, Men's Physique, 2024 Ms. Olympia, Fitness, 2024 Figure, 2024 Bikini Olympia.

== Venue ==
The venue returned to Las Vegas after switching to Orlando, Florida in 2023. Other than three years in Orlando (2020, 2021, 2023), Las Vegas has served as the host city for the Olympia since 1999.

== Results ==
Samson Dauda won the 60th edition of Mr. Olympia Men's Open competition in 2024, with a prize of $600,000. Hadi Choopan came in second with a prize of $250,000. Ten other winners from multiple divisions were crowned during the two days of division finals, including Chris Bumstead, who won the Classic Physique title for the sixth consecutive time.

Table key

Winner
Runner-Up
Third place

Place	Prize	Name	Country	Judging	Finals	Total
1	$600,000	Samson Dauda	England	8	6	14
2	$250,000	Hadi Choopan	Iran	8	9	17
3	$100,000	Derek Lunsford	United States	15	15	30
4	$40,000	Martin Fitzwater	United States	23	20	43
5	$35,000	Andrew 'Jacked' Chinedu Obiekea	United Arab Emirates	29	25	54
6	$25,000	Hunter Labrada	United States	25	30	55
7	$16,000	William Bonac	Netherlands	41	35	76
8	$14,000	Rafael Brandao	Brazil	35	46	81
9	$12,000	Brandon Curry	United States	45	48	93
10	$10,000	Akim Williams	United States	60	40	100
11	$2,000	John Jewett	United States	47	55	102
12	$2,000	Jonathan De La Rosa	United States	55	60	115
13	$2,000	Bruno Santos	Brazil	65	65	130
14	$2,000	Mohamed Foda	Egypt	70	73	143
15	$2,000	Theo Leguerrier	France	75	72	147
