= 2021 Mr. Olympia =

Bodybuilding competition held in Las Vegas, USA

- Genre: Professional bodybuilding competition
- Begins: October 8, 2021
- Ends: October 9, 2021
- Venue: Orange County Convention Center
- Location: Orlando, Florida
- Country: United States
- Previous event: 2020 Mr. Olympia
- Next event: 2022 Mr. Olympia
- Organizer: IFBB

The 2021 Mr. Olympia contest was a weekend-long IFBB Pro League professional bodybuilding competition that was held on October 8–9, 2021, in The Orange County Convention Center in Orlando, Florida. Mamdouh Elssbiay won the years' edition of Mr. Olympia.

== Venue ==
The Orange County Convention Center in Orlando, Florida, was the host building for the crowning of multiple world champions in bodybuilding and fitness. Because of the challenges of the pandemic, the organizers served the 2021 Olympia as a celebration of overcoming numerous forms of adversity to reach the pinnacle in fitness. As in previous years, the show was streamed live to a global audience.

== Results ==
Place	Prize	Name	Country	Judging	Finals	Total
1	$400,000	Mamdouh Elssbiay	(Egypt)	7	5	12
2	$150,000	Brandon Curry	(United States)	8	11	19
3	$100,000	Hadi Choopan	(Iran)	15	14	29
4	$40,000	Hunter Labrada	(United States)	20	20	40
5	$35,000	Nick Walker	(United States)	24	25	49
6	$25,000	William Bonac	(Netherlands)	30	30	60
7	$16,000	Iain Valliere	(Canada)	35	35	70
8	$14,000	Justin Rodriguez	(United States)	40	42	82
9	$12,000	Akim Williams	(United States)	49	48	97
10	$10,000	Mohamed Shaaban	(Egypt)	53	47	100
11	$2000	Roelly Winklaar	(Curaçao)	51	55	106
12	$2000	James Hollingshead	(United Kingdom)	60	65	125
13	$2000	Hassan Mostafa	(Egypt)	65	62	127
14	$2000	Patrick Moore	(United States)	70	68	138
15	$2000	Regan Grimes	(France)	75	75	150
16	$2000	Andrea Presti	(Italy)	80	80	160

=== Classic Physique ===
==== 2021 Mr. Olympia Classic Physique Top Five ====
1. Chris Bumstead $50,000
2. Terrence Ruffin $15,000
3. Breon Ansley $10,000
4. Urs Kalecinski $5,000
5. Ramon Rocha Querioz N/A

=== Mens Physique ===
==== 2021 Mr. Olympia Mens Physique Top Five ====
1. Brandon Hendrickson $50,000
2. Erin Banks $15,000
3. Diogo Montenegro $10,000
4. Kyron Holden N/A
5. Raymont Edmonds N/A
