= List of male professional bodybuilders =

This is a list of male professional bodybuilders.

== A ==
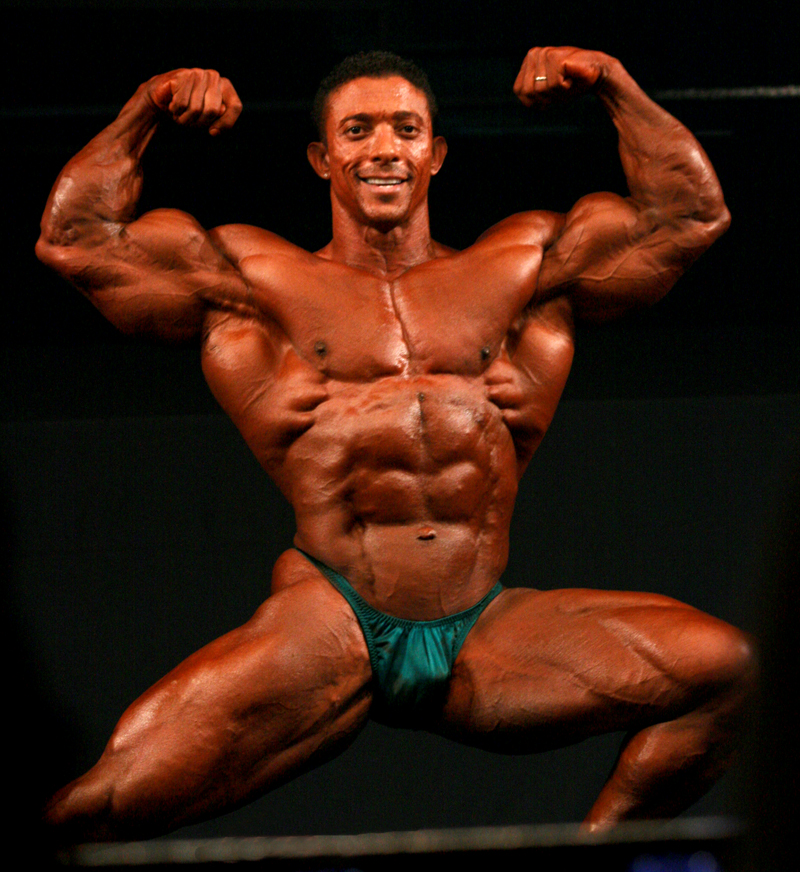
Troy Alves at the 2008 IFBB Australian Pro Grand Prix VIII

- Fouad Abiad
- Manohar Aich, "Pocket Hercules"
- Abdulhadi Al-Khayat
- Achim Albrecht
- Troy Alves
- Charles Atlas
- Art Atwood
- Dayo Audi

== B ==
- Jim Badra
- William Bankier
- Mohammad Bannout
- Samir Bannout
- Gustavo Badell
- Clarence Bass
- Mohammed Benaziza
- Francisco 'Paco' Bautista
- Albert Beckles
- Bob Birdsong
- Troy Brown
- Jeremy Buendia
- Chris Bumstead, "CBum"

== C ==
- Evan Centopani
- Marcos Chacon
- Darrem Charles
- Hadi Choopan, "The Persian Wolf"
- Sangram Chougule
- Bob Cicherillo
- Ronnie Coleman "The King", "Big Ron", "Muscle Coleman"
- Franco Columbu
- Chris Cook
- Chris Cormier
- Ed Corney
- Porter Cottrell
- Brandon Curry
- Jay Cutler

== D ==
- Gaétan D'Amours
- Roland Dantes, "Mr. Philippines", Martial Arts instructor, Arnis master
- Samson Dauda
- Premchand Degra
- Paul Demayo, "Quadzilla"
- Nathan DeTracy
- Chris Dickerson
- Paul Dillett
- Ramon Dino, "O Dinossauro do Acre" (Dinosaur from Acre)
- Dave Draper
- Mark Dugdale
- Carlos G. Duque

== E ==
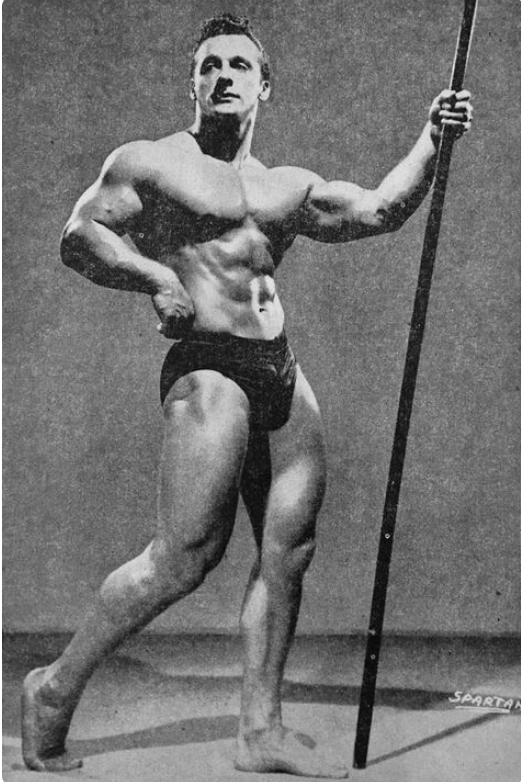
George Eiferman, March 1950

- Stan Efferding
- George Eiferman
- Nasser El Sonbaty, "The Professor"
- Mamdouh Elssbiay, "Big Ramy"
- Ahmet Enünlü

== F ==
- Erik Fankhouser
- Lou Ferrigno, actor and fitness trainer best known for the title role in The Incredible Hulk television series
- Dave Fisher
- Bertil Fox
- Felipe Franco
- Toney Freeman
- Alexandr Fedorov

== G ==
- Rich Gaspari
- Nazar Ghazali
- Varinder Singh Ghuman
- Charles Glass, godfather of bodybuilding
- Anders Graneheim
- Kai Greene
- John Grimek
- Guy Grundy

== H ==
- Ahmad Haidar
- Marcus Haley
- Lee Haney, "Total-Lee Awesome", eight-time Mr. Olympia
- Mark Harris
- Mickey Hargitay
- Phil Heath, "The Gift", seven-time Mr. Olympia
- David Henry
- Roy Hilligenn

== J ==
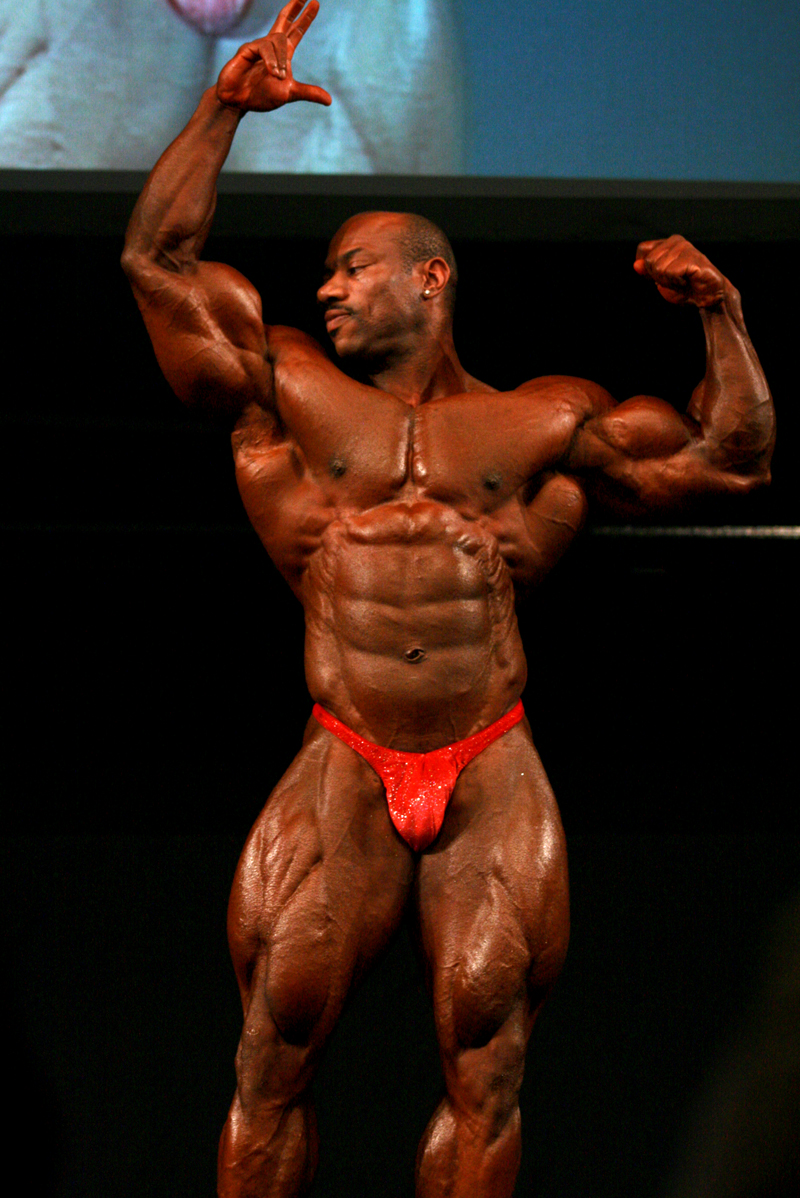
Dexter Jackson at the 2008 IFBB Australian Pro Grand Prix VIII

- Dexter Jackson, "The Blade"
- Johnnie O. Jackson
- Dennis James
- Rusty Jeffers
- Michael Johnson

== K ==
- Shahriar Kamali, "King Kamali"
- Mike Katz
- Edward Kawak
- Michael Kefalianos
- Suhas Khamkar, nine-time Mr. India, Mr. Asia 2010
- Kim Kold, "Winner at Danish Bodybuilding Championship in 2006"
- Greg Kovacs

== L ==
- Lee Labrada
- Jack LaLanne
- Kevin Levrone "The Maryland Muscle Machine"
- James "Flex" Lewis
- Aaron Links
- Anibal Lopez
- Dan Lurie, AAU Mr. America "America's Most Muscular Man" 1942-1946

== M ==
- Víctor Martínez, "Dominican Dominator"
- Mike Matarazzo
- Earl Maynard
- Frank McGrath, "Bryn"
- Tim McGuire
- Stan McQuay
- Mike Mentzer, "Mister Heavy Duty"
- Ray Mentzer, brother of Mike Mentzer
- Mustafa Mohammad
- Andreas Münzer

== N ==
- Kodi Rammurthy Naidu
- Jamo Nezzar
- Konstantin Nerchenko
- Serge Nubret
- Tony Nicholson

== O ==
- Sergei Ogorodnikov
- Mike O'Hearn
- Sergio Oliva, "The Myth", three-time Mr. Olympia

== P ==
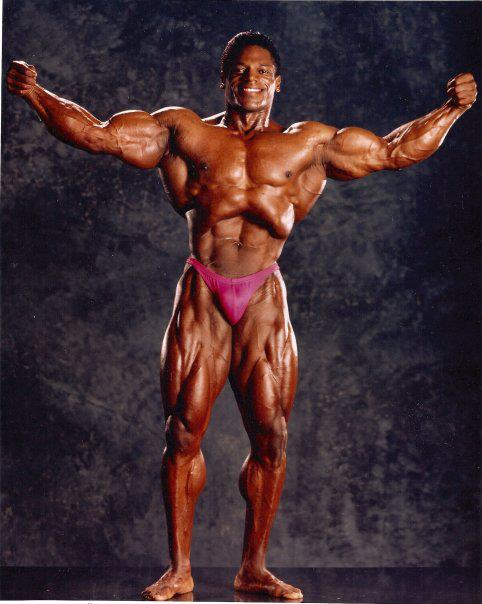
Tony Pearson

- Danny Padilla, "The Giant Killer"
- Ben Pakulski
- Dave Palumbo
- Bob Paris
- Reg Park
- David Paul (of the Barbarian Twins)
- Peter Paul (of the Barbarian Twins)
- Bill Pearl
- Tony Pearson
- Rich Piana
- Robert Piotrkowicz
- Tom Platz, "The Quadfather", "The Golden Eagle"
- Harold Poole
- Edson Prado
- Lee Priest
- Tom Prince
- Lucion Pushparaj, "Black Lion of Asia"
- Peter Putnam

== R ==
- Ade Rai
- Shawn Ray
- Tito Raymond
- Steve Reeves
- Arthur Robin
- Robby Robinson, "The Black Prince"
- Ronny Rockel
- Clarence Ross
- Raymond Routledge
- Markus Rühl

== S ==
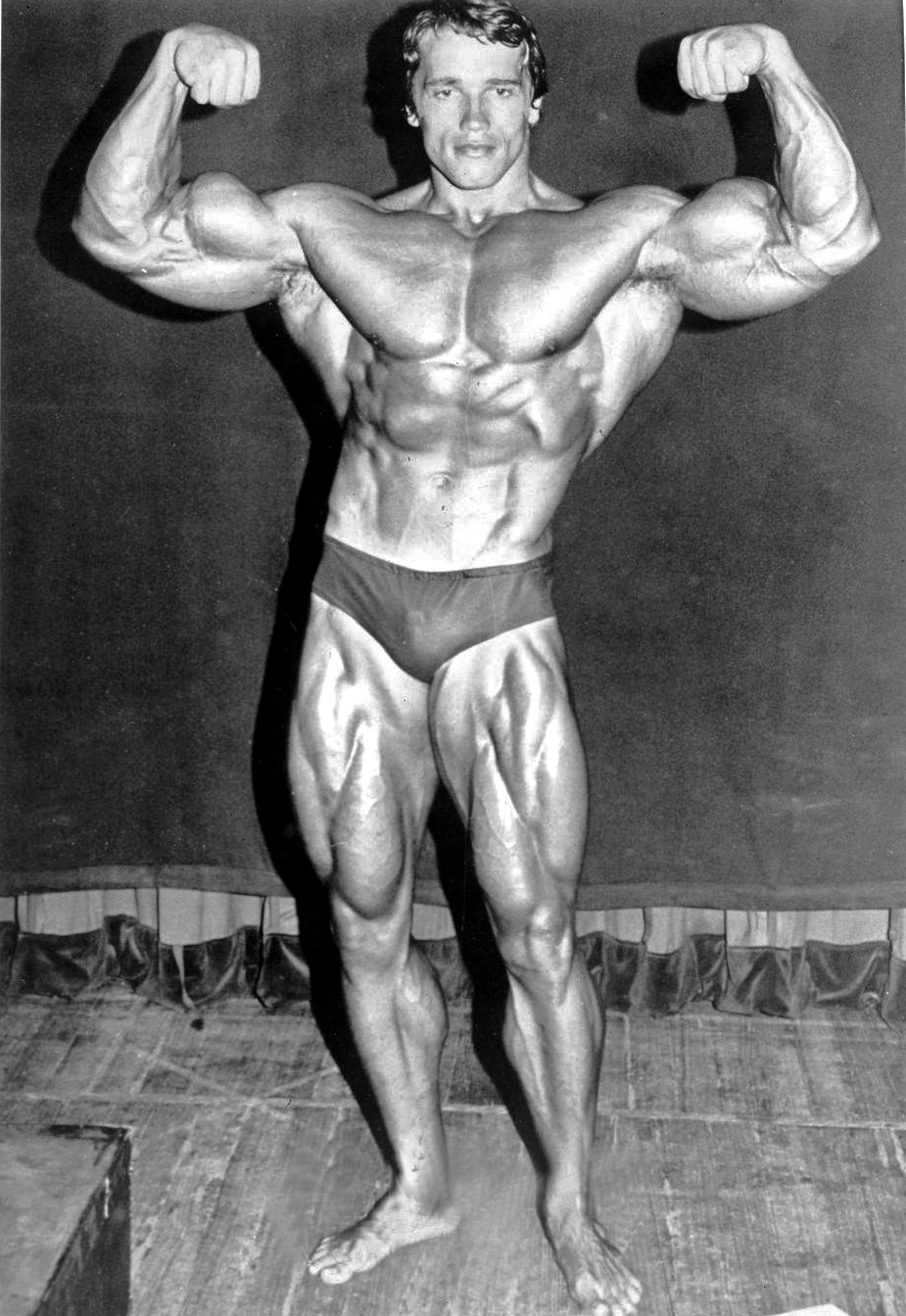
Arnold Schwarzenegger in 1974

- Feras Saied
- Frank Saldo
- Monte Saldo
- Abu Salim, actor and bodybuilder
- Silvio Samuel
- Eugen Sandow, "father" of modern bodybuilding
- Miloš Šarčev
- Marko Savolainen, "Supermass"
- Günter Schlierkamp, "The Gentle Giant"
- Sonny Schmidt, "Samoan", Masters Olympia Champion 1995
- Armin Scholz
- Arnold Schwarzenegger, "The Austrian Oak", Mr. Universe 1968, seven-time Mr. Olympia, actor, politician
- Larry Scott, "The Legend", two-time Mr. Universe, two-time Mr. Olympia
- Vic Seipke
- Sergey Shelestov
- Radosław Słodkiewicz
- Gary Strydom
- Joel Stubbs
- Sam Sulek

== T ==
- Vince Taylor
- Craig Titus
- Ramesses Tlyakodugov
- Al Treloar, winner of the first international bodybuilding contest in the United States, 1904

== V ==
- Casey Viator
- Wesley Vissers
- Mikhail Volinkin

== W ==
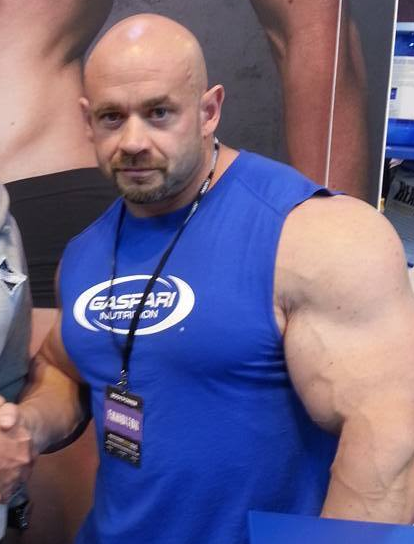
Branch Warren

- Ken Waller
- Branch Warren, "Quadrasaurus Pecs"
- Rick Wayne
- Ken "Flex" Wheeler, "Sultan of Symmetry"
- Jusup Wilkosz
- Bill Wilmore
- Scott Wilson
- Dennis Wolf, "Big Bad Wolf"

== Y ==
- Hidetada Yamagishi, "The Dragon"
- Dorian Yates, "The Shadow", six-time Mr. Olympia

== Z ==
- Frank Zane, "The Chemist", three-time Mr. Olympia
