= 2009 Mr. Olympia =

Professional bodybuilding competition

- Genre: Professional bodybuilding competition
- Begins: September 24, 2009
- Ends: September 27, 2009
- Venue: Orleans Arena
- Locations: Las Vegas, Nevada
- Country: United States
- Previous event: 2008 Mr. Olympia
- Next event: 2010 Mr. Olympia
- Organizer: IFBB

The 2009 Mr. Olympia contest was an IFBB professional bodybuilding competition and the feature event of Joe Weider's Olympia Fitness & Performance Weekend 2009 held September 24–27, 2009 at the Orleans Arena in Las Vegas, Nevada. Other events at the exhibition included the 202 Olympia Showdown, Ms. Olympia, Fitness Olympia, and Figure Olympia contests.

== Results ==
Place	Prize	Name	Country	1+2	3	4	Points
1	$200,000	Jay Cutler	(United States)	5	5	5	15
2	$100,000	Branch Warren	(United States)	16	16	14	46
3	$75,000	Dexter Jackson	(United States)	10	18	19	47
4	$50,000	Kai Greene	(United States)	13	19	22	54
5	$40,000	Phil Heath	(United States)	24	17	14	55
6	$30,000	Víctor Martínez	(Dominican Republic)	30	30	30	90
7	$18,000	Ronny Rockel	(Germany)	35	43		78
8	$17,000	Toney Freeman	(United States)	38	42		80
9	$16,000	Hidetada Yamagishi	(Japan)	45	57		102
10	$14,000	Moe El Moussawi	(France)	51	52		103
11	$4,000	Melvin Anthony	(United States)	60	44		104
11	$4,000	Silvio Samuel	(Spain)	49	55		104
13	$4,000	Gustavo Badell	(Venezuela)	53	59		112
14	$4,000	Dennis James	(Germany)	61	71		132
15	$4,000	Markus Rühl	(Germany)	63	72		136
16	$2,000	Troy Alves	(United States)	80			80
16	$2,000	Darrem Charles	(Trinidad and Tobago)	80			80
16	$2,000	Ahmad Haidar	(France)	80			80
16	$2,000	Michael Kefalianos	(Greece)	80			80
16	$2,000	Martin Kjellström	(Sweden)	80			80
16	$2,000	Joel Stubbs	(The Bahamas)	80			80
16	$2,000	Bill Wilmore	(United States)	80			80
16	$2,000	Dennis Wolf	(Germany)	80			80

== Notable events ==
- Jay Cutler became the first bodybuilder in Mr. Olympia history to reclaim his title after losing to Dexter Jackson in 2008.
- Dexter Jackson, defending his 2008 championship, came in 3rd losing by one point to a vastly improved Branch Warren.
- Cutler first performed his famous quad stomp (before his abs and thigh pose) in a prejudging comparison with Jackson.

== See also ==
- 2009 Ms. Olympia
