= 2007 Mr. Olympia =

International bodybuilding competition

The 2007 Mr. Olympia contest was an IFBB professional bodybuilding competition and the feature event of Joe Weider's Olympia Weekend 2007 held September 28–29, 2007 at the Orleans Arena in Las Vegas, Nevada.

== Results ==
| Place | Prize | Name | Country | 1+2 | 3 | 4 | Points |
|---|---|---|---|---|---|---|---|
| 1 | $155,000 | Jay Cutler | (United States) | 14 | 8 | 6 | 28 |
| 2 | $90,000 | Víctor Martínez | (Dominican Republic) | 16 | 7 | 9 | 32 |
| 3 | $60,000 | Dexter Jackson | (United States) | 30 | 16 | 16 | 62 |
| 4 | $48,000 | Ronnie Coleman | (United States) | 48 | 21 | 20 | 89 |
| 5 | $38,000 | Dennis Wolf | (Germany) | 50 | 25 | 25 | 100 |
| 6 | $30,000 | Melvin Anthony | (United States) | 48 | 29 | 30 | 107 |
| 7 | $18,000 | Silvio Samuel | (Spain) | 76 | 37 | | 113 |
| 8 | $17,000 | Gustavo Badell | (Venezuela) | 76 | 42 | | 118 |
| 9 | $16,000 | Johnnie O. Jackson | (United States) | 92 | 47 | | 139 |
| 10 | $14,000 | David Henry | (United States) | 98 | 46 | | 144 |
| 11 | $4,000 | Ronny Rockel | (Germany) | 110 | 57 | | 167 |
| 12 | $4,000 | Darrem Charles | (Trinidad and Tobago) | 140 | 57 | | 197 |
| 13 | $4,000 | Hidetada Yamagishi | (Japan) | 130 | 71 | | 201 |
| 14 | $4,000 | Toney Freeman | (United States) | 138 | 67 | | 205 |
| 15 | $4,000 | Will Harris | (United States) | 140 | 68 | | 208 |
| 16 | $4,000 | Mark Dugdale | (United States) | 160 | | | 160 |
| 16 | $4,000 | Sergey Shelestov | (Russia) | 160 | | | 160 |
| 16 | $4,000 | Quincy Taylor | (United States) | 160 | | | 160 |
| 16 | $4,000 | Bill Wilmore | (United States) | 160 | | | 160 |
| 16 | $4,000 | Eddie Abbew | (United Kingdom) | 160 | | | 160 |
| 16 | $4,000 | Vince Taylor | (United States) | 160 | | | 160 |
| 16 | $4,000 | Markus Rühl | (Germany) | 160 | | | 160 |
| 16 | $4,000 | Francisco Bautista | (Spain) | 160 | | | 160 |
| 16 | $4,000 | Marcus Haley | (United States) | 160 | | | 160 |

== Notable events ==
- Jay Cutler wins his second consecutive Mr. Olympia title
- Víctor Martínez had an impressive showing, narrowly placing 2nd
- After the competition, Ronnie Coleman announced his retirement from professional bodybuilding

== See also ==
- 2007 Ms. Olympia
- Ronnie Coleman retirement speech (video)
