= 2008 Mr. Olympia =

Bodybuilding competition

The 2008 Mr. Olympia contest was an IFBB professional bodybuilding competition and the feature event of Joe Weider's Olympia Fitness & Performance Weekend 2008 held September 26–27, 2008 at the Orleans Arena in Las Vegas, Nevada. Other events at the exhibition included the 202 Olympia Showdown, and Ms. Olympia contests.

== Results ==
| Place | Prize | Name | Country | 1+2 | 3 | 4 | Points |
|---|---|---|---|---|---|---|---|
| 1 | $155,000 | Dexter Jackson | (United States) | 12 | 9 | 11 | 32 |
| 2 | $90,000 | Jay Cutler | (United States) | 20 | 10 | 9 | 39 |
| 3 | $60,000 | Phil Heath | (United States) | 28 | 13 | 12 | 53 |
| 4 | $48,000 | Dennis Wolf | (Germany) | 40 | 23 | 22 | 85 |
| 5 | $38,000 | Toney Freeman | (United States) | 50 | 22 | 22 | 94 |
| 6 | $30,000 | Melvin Anthony | (United States) | 62 | 33 | 30 | 125 |
| 7 | $18,000 | Silvio Samuel | (Spain) | 76 | 32 | | 108 |
| 8 | $17,000 | Dennis James | (Germany) | 74 | 43 | | 117 |
| 9 | $16,000 | Moe El Moussawi | (France) | 94 | 51 | | 145 |
| 10 | $14,000 | Gustavo Badell | (Venezuela) | 100 | 48 | | 148 |
| 11 | $4,000 | Darrem Charles | (Trinidad and Tobago) | 106 | 50 | | 156 |
| 12 | $4,000 | Johnnie O. Jackson | (United States) | 122 | 65 | | 187 |
| 13 | $4,000 | Craig Richardson | (United States) | 138 | 63 | | 201 |
| 14 | $4,000 | Ronny Rockel | (Germany) | 134 | 69 | | 203 |
| 15 | $4,000 | David Henry | (United States) | 142 | 66 | | 208 |
| 16 | $4,000 | Kevin English | (United States) | 158 | 77 | | 235 |
| 17 | $4,000 | Fouad Abiad | (France) | 160 | 80 | | 240 |
| 17 | $4,000 | Leo Ingram | (United States) | 160 | 80 | | 240 |
| 17 | $4,000 | Sergey Shelestov | (Russia) | 160 | 80 | | 240 |

== Notable events ==
- Dexter Jackson defeats the reigning champion and two-time Mr. Olympia, Jay Cutler, to win his first Mr. Olympia title
- Phil Heath, in his rookie debut at the Olympia, places third
- Víctor Martínez, the 2007 runner-up, did not compete due to injury

== See also ==
- 2008 Ms. Olympia
