= 2011 Mr. Olympia =

Professional bodybuilding competition

- Genre: Professional bodybuilding competition
- Begins: September 15, 2011
- Ends: September 18, 2011
- Venue: Las Vegas Convention Center and Orleans Arena
- Locations: Las Vegas, Nevada
- Country: United States
- Previous event: 2010 Mr. Olympia
- Next event: 2012 Mr. Olympia
- Organizer: IFBB

The 2011 Mr. Olympia contest was an IFBB professional bodybuilding competition and the feature event of Joe Weider's Olympia Fitness & Performance Weekend 2011 held September 15–18, 2011 at the Las Vegas Convention Center and Orleans Arena in Las Vegas, Nevada. It was the 47th Mr. Olympia competition. Other events at the exhibition included the 202 Olympia Showdown, Ms. Olympia, Fitness Olympia, and Figure Olympia contests.

== Results ==
Place	Prize	Name	Country	1+2	4	Points
1	$200,000	Phil Heath	(United States)	5	5	10
2	$100,000	Jay Cutler	(United States)	10	10	20
3	$75,000	Kai Greene	(United States)	15	16	31
4	$50,000	Víctor Martínez	(Dominican Republic)	26	20	46
5	$40,000	Dennis Wolf	(Germany)	23	24	47
6	$30,000	Dexter Jackson	(United States)	25	29	54
7	$18,000	Toney Freeman	(United States)	38	37	75
8	$17,000	Brandon Curry	(United States)	44	40	84
9	$16,000	Ronny Rockel	(Germany)	45	44	89
10	$14,000	Hidetada Yamagishi	(Japan)	45	48	93
11	$4000	Shawn Rhoden	(Jamaica)	50	55	105
12	$4000	Edward Nunn	(United States)	67	61	128
13	$4000	Johnnie O. Jackson	(United States)	65	67	132
14	$4000	Marius Dohne	(South Africa)	69	67	136
15	$4000	Craig Richardson	(United States)	77	73	150
16		Frank McGrath	(Canada)	79		79
17		Ben White	(United States)	80		80
17		Evgeny Mishin	(Russia)	80		80
17		Marc LaVoie	(Canada)	80		80
17		Marcus Haley	(United States)	80		80
17		Michael Kefalianos	(Greece)	80		80
17		Robert Piotrkowicz	(Poland)	80		80
17		Robert Burneika	(Poland)	80		80
17		Troy Alves	(United States)	80		80

== Notable events ==
- Jay Cutler tore his left biceps several weeks before the competition, the injury impacted his conditioning and later required surgery to repair
- Phil Heath won his first championship in his fourth Mr. Olympia competition

== See also ==
- 2011 Ms. Olympia
