= 2006 Mr. Olympia =

Professional bodybuilding competition

The 2006 Mr. Olympia contest was an IFBB professional bodybuilding competition and the feature event of Joe Weider's 2006 Olympia Weekend held September 29–30, 2006 at the Orleans Arena in Las Vegas, Nevada.

== Results ==
The total prize money for the Mr. Olympia contest was increased from $480,000 to $546,000.

Place	Prize	Name	Country	1+2	3	4	Points
1	$155,000	Jay Cutler	(United States)	12	5	5	22
2	$91,000	Ronnie Coleman	(United States)	18	10	10	38
3	$60,000	Víctor Martínez	(Dominican Republic)	34	16	16	66
4	$48,000	Dexter Jackson	(United States)	36	20	19	75
5	$38,000	Melvin Anthony	(United States)	50	25	26	101
6	$30,000	Gustavo Badell	(Venezuela)	62	30	29	121
7	$18,000	Toney Freeman	(United States)	68	35		103
8	$17,000	Markus Rühl	(Germany)	84	41		125
9	$16,000	Dennis James	(Germany)	96	47		143
10	$14,000	Günter Schlierkamp	(Germany)	102	54		156
11	$4,000	Vince Taylor	(United States)	120	50		170
12	$4,000	Branch Warren	(United States)	114	61		175
13	$4,000	Johnnie O. Jackson	(United States)	130	67		197
14	$4,000	Darrem Charles	(Trinidad and Tobago)	148	62		210
15	$4,000	Troy Alves	(United States)	142	75		217
16	$4,000	Francisco Autista	(Spain)	160			160
16	$4,000	Dennis Wolf	(Germany)	160			160
16	$4,000	Rodney St. Cloud	(United States)	160			160
16	$4,000	Ronny Rockel	(Germany)	160			160
16	$4,000	Mustafa Mohammad	(Jordan)	160			160
16	$4,000	Bill Wilmore	(United States)	160			160
16	$4,000	David Henry	(United States)	160			160

== Notable events ==
- Jay Cutler, after finishing 2nd place in four previous Mr Olympia contests, wins his first title
- Ronnie Coleman, after eight consecutive wins, is defeated and remains tied with Lee Haney for most Mr. Olympia titles

== See also ==
- 2006 Ms. Olympia
