= 2012 Mr. Olympia =

Bodybuilding competition

- Genre: Professional bodybuilding competition
- Begins: September 27, 2012
- Ends: September 30, 2012
- Venue: Las Vegas Convention Center and Orleans Arena
- Locations: Las Vegas, Nevada
- Country: United States
- Previous event: 2011 Mr. Olympia
- Next event: 2013 Mr. Olympia
- Organizer: IFBB

The 2012 Mr. Olympia contest was an IFBB professional bodybuilding competition and the feature event of Joe Weider's Olympia Fitness & Performance Weekend 2012 held September 27–30, 2012 at the Las Vegas Convention Center and Orleans Arena in Las Vegas, Nevada. It was the 48th Mr. Olympia competition. Other events at the exhibition included the 212 Olympia Showdown, Ms. Olympia, Fitness Olympia, and Figure Olympia contests. The documentary film Generation Iron was filmed while following several Olympia contestants as they prepared for this competition.

== Results ==
A total prize pool of $650,000 was awarded.

Place	Prize	Name	Country	1+2	4	Points
1	$250,000	Phil Heath	(United States)	5	5	10
2	$100,000	Kai Greene	(United States)	10	10	20
3	$75,000	Shawn Rhoden	(Jamaica)	15	16	31
4	$50,000	Dexter Jackson	(United States)	20	20	40
5	$40,000	Branch Warren	(United States)	25	31	56
6	$30,000	Dennis Wolf	(Germany)	35	24	59
7	$18,000	Toney Freeman	(United States)	30	34	64
8	$17,000	Evan Centopani	(United States)	42	40	82
9	$16,000	Johnnie O. Jackson	(United States)	45	46	91
10	$14,000	Lionel Beyeke	(France)	51	52	103
11	$4,000	Ben Pakulski	(Canada)	54	55	109
12	$4,000	Roelly Winklaar	(Curaçao)	62	62	124
13	$4,000	Ronny Rockel	(Germany)	63	67	130
14	$4,000	Essa Obaid	(United Arab Emirates)	72	65	137
15	$4,000	Hidetada Yamagishi	(Japan)	74	75	149
16	$2,000	Bill Wilmore	(United States)	74	76	150
17	$2,000	Baitollah Abbaspour	(Iran)	80	80	160
17	$2,000	Fred Smalls	(United States)	80	80	160
17	$2,000	Michael Kefalianos	(Greece)	80	80	160

== Notable events ==
- Phil Heath won his second consecutive IFBB Mr. Olympia title
- Kai Greene placed second, his best ever showing after finishing third in the 2011 Mr. Olympia contest
- Evan Centopani placed eighth in his Mr. Olympia debut
- Toney Freeman, at the age of 46 years, finished in seventh place
- Jay Cutler, four-time Mr. Olympia, could not compete after undergoing surgery for a torn left bicep

== See also ==
- 2012 Ms. Olympia
