= 2010 Mr. Olympia =

Professional bodybuilding competition

- Genre: Professional bodybuilding competition
- Begins: September 24, 2010
- Ends: September 25, 2010
- Venue: Orleans Arena
- Locations: Las Vegas, Nevada
- Country: United States
- Previous event: 2009 Mr. Olympia
- Next event: 2011 Mr. Olympia
- Organizer: IFBB

The 2010 Mr. Olympia was an IFBB professional bodybuilding competition and the feature event of Joe Weider's Olympia Fitness & Performance Weekend 2010 which was held September 23–26, 2010 at the Las Vegas Convention Center and the Orleans Arena in Las Vegas, Nevada. It was the 46th Mr. Olympia competition. Other events at the exhibition included the 202 Olympia Showdown, Ms. Olympia, Fitness Olympia, and Figure Olympia contests. The Mr. Olympia itself was held on September 24-25 at the Orleans Arena, with prejudging on Friday and the finals on Saturday.

== Results ==
Place	Prize money	Name	Country	1+2	4	Points
1	$200,000	Jay Cutler	(United States)	6	5	11
2	$100,000	Phil Heath	(United States)	9	10	19
3	$75,000	Branch Warren	(United States)	16	15	31
4	$50,000	Dexter Jackson	(United States)	19	20	39
5	$40,000	Dennis Wolf	(Germany)	26	25	51
6	$30,000	Ronny Rockel	(Germany)	30	30	60
7	$18,000	Kai Greene	(United States)	35		35
8	$17,000	Víctor Martínez	(Dominican Republic)	36		36
9	$16,000	Toney Freeman	(United States)	45		45
10	$14,000	Hidetada Yamagishi	(Japan)	56		56
11	$4,000	Dennis James	(Germany)	57		57
11	$4,000	Johnnie O. Jackson	(United States)	57		57
13	$4,000	Marcus Haley	(United States)	64		64
14	$4,000	Roelly Winklaar	(Curaçao)	73		73
15	$4,000	Troy Alves	(United States)	76		76
16	$2,000	Edward Nunn	(United States)	78		78
17	$2,000	Evgeny Mishin	(Russia)	79		79
18	$2,000	Bill Willmore	(United States)	80		80
18	$2,000	Craig Richardson	(United States)	80		80
18	$2,000	Erik Fankhouser	(United States)	80		80
18	$2,000	Francisco Bautista	(Spain)	80		80
18	$2,000	Robert Piotrkowicz	(Poland)	80		80

== Notable events ==
- Jay Cutler celebrated his fourth title, and second consecutive victory
- Dexter Jackson, the 2008 champion, placed 4th
- Phil Heath placed runner-up in his third Mr. Olympia contest. He placed 3rd in 2008 and 5th in 2009.
- 11 of the 12 Mr. Olympias stood onstage together during the Saturday finals, and the 12th, California governor Arnold Schwarzenegger, spoke in a video message. This was the final time all Mr. Olympias appeared together.

== See also ==
- 2010 Ms. Olympia
