= 2013 Mr. Olympia =

Professional bodybuilding competition

- Genre: Professional bodybuilding competition
- Begins: September 27, 2013
- Ends: September 28, 2013
- Venue: Orleans Arena at The Orleans Hotel and Casino
- Location: Paradise, Nevada
- Country: United States
- Previous event: 2012 Mr. Olympia
- Next event: 2014 Mr. Olympia
- Organizer: IFBB

The 2013 Mr. Olympia contest was an IFBB professional bodybuilding competition held September 27–28, 2013, at the Orleans Arena at The Orleans Hotel and Casino in Paradise, Nevada. It was the 49th Mr. Olympia competition held. Other events at the exhibition included the 212 Olympia Showdown, Ms. Olympia, Fitness Olympia, Figure Olympia, Bikini Olympia, Women's Physique Showdown, and Men's Physique Showdown contests.

== Results ==
A total prize pool of $675,000 was awarded.

Place	Prize	Name	Country	1+2	4	Points
1	$250,000	Phil Heath	(United States)	5	5	10
2	$125,000	Kai Greene	(United States)	10	11	21
3	$80,000	Dennis Wolf	(Germany)	15	14	29
4	$50,000	Shawn Rhoden	(Jamaica)	20	27	47
5	$40,000	Dexter Jackson	(United States)	25	26	51
6	$30,000	Jay Cutler	(United States)	31	24	55
7	$20,000	Roelly Winklaar	(Curaçao)	34	35	69
8	$18,000	Mamdouh Elssbiay	(Egypt)	42	45	87
9	$17,000	Branch Warren	(United States)	53	40	93
10	$15,000	Lionel Beyeke	(France)	45	53	98
11		Víctor Martínez	(Dominican Republic)	59	52	111
12		Cedric McMillan	(United States)	60	60	120
13		Evan Centopani	(United States)	61	65	126
14		Steve Kuclo	(United States)	68	69	137
15		Toney Freeman	(United States)	77	75	152
16		Johnnie Jackson	(United States)	78	80	158
17		Essa Obaid	(United Arab Emirates)	80	80	160
17		Robert Piotrkowicz	(Poland)	80	80	160
17		Baitollah Abbaspour	(Iran)	80	80	160
17		Brandon Curry	(United States)	80	80	160

== See also ==
- 2013 Ms. Olympia
