= Bannout =

Bannout is a Lebanese surname. Notable people with the surname include:

- Mohammad Bannout (born 1976), Lebanese bodybuilder, nephew of Samir
- Samir Bannout (born 1955), Lebanese bodybuilder
