= Shahriar Kamali =

IFBB professional bodybuilder

King Kamali
- Professional bodybuilder
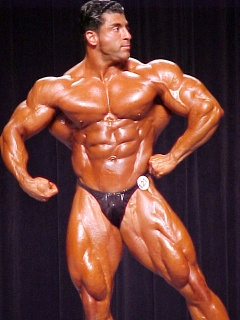

Personal info
- Nickname: The Persian Pearl, The Terminator
- Born: March 29, 1972 (age 54); Tehran, Iran

Best statistics
- Height: 1.77 m (5 ft 10 in)

Professional (Pro) career
- Best win: 1999 NPC Nationals, HeavyWeight, 1st

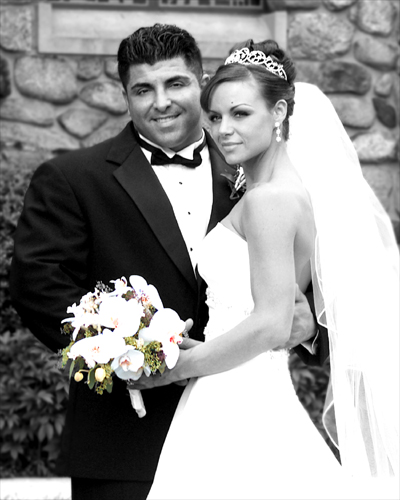
King Kamali and Barbara Ward Kamali

Shahriar Kamali (Persian: شهریار کمالی; born 29 March 1972 in Tehran ), known as King Kamali, is a retired IFBB professional bodybuilder.

== Biography ==
Nicknamed "The Persian Pearl" and "The Terminator", Kamali was born in Iran, and now lives in West New York, New Jersey and New City, New York. Kamali has a Bachelor of Science degree in Exercise Physiology from George Mason University The resulting knowledge about human kinesiology and sport nutrition combined with his distinctive posing styles makes Kamali a sought out bodybuilder for seminars and guest appearances. He has been featured in many bodybuilding articles, as well as being on the cover of Muscle Magazine.

== Competitive stats ==
- Height: 5 ft 10 in (178 cm)
- Contest Weight: 225 lb (102 kg)
- Off-Season Weight: 310 lb (141 kg)
- Arms: 19 in (48.26 cm)
- Waist: 36 in (91.44 cm)
- Chest: 50 in (127 cm)
- Thighs: 30 in (76.2 cm)

== Competitive history ==
- 1994 NPC Collegiate Nationals, Light-Heavyweight, 1st and Overall
- 1996 NPC Nationals, HeavyWeight, 10th tied
- 1997 NPC Nationals, HeavyWeight, 7th
- 1998 NPC Nationals, HeavyWeight, 3rd
- 1999 NPC Nationals, HeavyWeight, 1st
- 2001 Arnold Classic, 4th
- 2001 Ironman Pro Invitational, 3rd
- 2001 Mr. Olympia, 10th
- 2002 Mr. Olympia, 17th
- 2002 Show of Strength Pro Championship, 11th
- 2003 Night of Champions, 14th
- 2004 Arnold Classic, 8th
- 2004 Grand Prix Australia, 5th
- 2005 Arnold Classic, 11th
- 2005 Ironman Pro Invitational, 5th
- 2005 San Francisco Pro Invitational, 12th
- 2006 New York Pro Championships, 16th
- 2006 Europa Super Show, 11th
- 2006 Montreal Pro, 14th
- 2006 Atlantic City Pro, 15th

== See also ==
- Arnold Classic
- List of male professional bodybuilders
