= Marcos Chacon =

Spanish bodybuilder

Chacon Marcos
- professional bodybuilder

Personal info
- Born: 1972; Spain

Best statistics

Professional (Pro) career
- Active: Yes

Marcos Chacon (born 1972 in Spain) is an IFBB professional bodybuilder.

== Biography ==
Marcos Chacón his real name is Marcos Chacón Mcwenney. He is a famous Spanish bodybuilder. He has recently left the business of his gym that he had for many years in Almuñécar for an underwater aquatic business.

== Titles ==
MR. Spain IFBB. MR. Granada. Marcos is a Granadaian native who went from amateur to pro, when he was discovered by Francisco del Yerro and received pro status in 2007. Chacón moved to Madrid at a young age. Mr legiónman.

== Stats ==
- Age: 45
- Height: 5 ft 7 in (1.70 m)
- Weight: 225 lb (102 kg)

== Contest history ==
Pro

- Europa Pro-Madrid 2011, 7
- Grand prix atlantic city pro 2009, 10
- Grand Prix Rumania-Timișoara 2008, 7
- Open Atlantic City-New Jersey 2008, 7
- Open Atlantic City Master-New Jersey 2008, 5
- Open Tampa Grand Prix-Florida 2008, 9
- Grand Prix Santa Susana-España 2006, 8

Amateur

- Campeónato de Granada 1987, 2.
- winner of Andalucia Jr 1988
- Winner of Andalucia weight 1991
- Olimpia Spain winner weight 1991
- Campeonato Andalucia 1995 winner weigh and overall.
- Olympia Spanish weigh 1995, 3
- Campeón Pesos Pesados Olympia Nacional 1996
- Villa de Madrid 1997 winner
- Open Santander 1997 winner.
- Campeonato of Spain weigh IFBB 1997, winner.
- Open Nacional Eusebio Esteban 2002, 2.
- Campeonato of Spain AEF weigh 2003, winner.
- Open Costa Del Sol Absoluto 2003, 2.
- Mr Universo Talla Baja Nabaa-Alemania 2003
- Open Nacional Ulises Navarro 2005, winners overall.
- Campeonato of Spain weigh 2005, winners.
- Open Fitform 2005 winner overall.

He was a campetitions:

- World Championships 2002
- New York Pro Show IFBB 2006
- Ironman Pro IFBB 2006,
- Arnold Classic, Pro IFBB 2007,
- New York Pro Show IFBB 2007,
- Mr Olympia 2007,
- Mr. Olympia 2008,

== See also ==
- List of male professional bodybuilders
- List of female professional bodybuilders
