= Anders Graneheim =

Swedish bodybuilder (born 1962)

- Born: Anders Victor Graneheim; May 3, 1962 (age 63); Timrå, Sweden
- Website: www.andersgraneheim.se

Anders Graneheim (born May 3, 1962) is a Swedish bodybuilder. He was Swedish and Nordic Bodybuilding Champion during the 1980s. After a nine-year absence from competitive bodybuilding he competed in the "Sweden Grand Prix" in Gothenburg in 1997, where he placed third after two professional bodybuilders.

He won the Swedish competition B&K Classic Body Show in 2000 which earned him a pro card in bodybuilding. He also competed in Master's Mr. Olympia in USA in August 2002.

Anders Graneheim is a popular guest poser at bodybuilding contests and sports events, and he holds seminars about training and nutrition in gyms, sports centers and schools, and he is engaged as a nutrition expert for Swedish athletes and sports teams. He also writes articles for the Swedish bodybuilding monthly BODY Magazine (formerly B&K Sports Magazine), in which he also has a regular expert column.

With a career spanning over more than 20 years, Anders Graneheim is regarded as one of Sweden's most outstanding bodybuilders. He is regarded as Sweden's best bodybuilder ever when it comes to symmetry, and he is one of the few bodybuilders in Sweden that is also known to the general public.

Anders Graneheim has been portrayed in a one-hour TV documentary named Sista Posen ("The Last Pose") on Swedish Television, in which a camera team followed his training and preparation for the Master's Mr. Olympia competition in the summer of 2002. The documentary was aired on Swedish Television in 2003 and has also been aired on Danish and Norwegian television in 2004 and 2005.

== Anders Graneheim's major bodybuilding competitions and titles ==
As a Junior:

1983:

- Mr. Fotonorden (a photo competition for young bodybuilders from the Nordic countries)

1983:

- Norrland Champion (weight class -70 kg) Norrland is a region in Sweden
- National Champion (-70 kg)
- Nordic Champion (-70 kg)

Senior Division:

1985:

- European Championships Qualification, 2nd place, -80 kg

1986:

- Norrland Champion (-80 kg)
- National Champion (-80 kg)

1988:

- National Champion (-90 kg)

1997:

- Sweden Grand Prix, 3rd place, (his first competition in nine years)

2000:

- Winner, B&K Classic Body Show

2002:

- Master's Mr. Olympia, 10th place

== See also ==
- List of male professional bodybuilders
