= Dave Fisher (bodybuilder) =

Canadian-American bodybuilder

- Professional bodybuilder

Personal info
- Born: February 1, 1964 (age 61); Montreal, Quebec, Canada

Best statistics
- Height: 5 ft 7 in (1.70 m)
- Weight: Contest: 220 lb (100 kg)

Professional (Pro) career
- Best win: 1993 North American Championships – HeavyWeight

David "Dave" Fisher (born February 1, 1964) is a Canadian-born American professional bodybuilder and gym owner. He competed as an International Fitness and Bodybuilding Federation (IFBB) professional in the 1990s and 2000s. Fisher is the founder and owner of Dave Fisher's Powerhouse Gym in Torrance, California.

== Early life ==
Fisher was born in Montreal, Canada and attended Henry Wise Wood High School in Calgary, Alberta. He began training at age 13, and migrated to the United States in approximately 1989. He settled in Venice Beach, California to pursue bodybuilding. Upon arrival, he faced hardships, including sleeping on lifeguard stands.

Fisher obtained a green card and became a U.S. citizen around 2007. He attended the Los Angeles County Sheriff's Academy and was hired as a deputy sheriff but suffered a torn hamstring. He was later asked to join the department, but he abandoned that career path in favor of opening his own gym.

== Bodybuilding career ==
Fisher competed from 1991 to 2006, participating in 16 contests. At 5 ft 7 in, Fisher competed at approximately 220 pounds. He placed second in the light-heavyweight class at the 1991 and 1992 IFBB North American Championships before winning the heavyweight and overall titles in 1993, which earned his IFBB pro card. He placed 11th at the Arnold Classic in 1995. He appeared on the covers of MuscleMag International (April 1993, Issue 130; May 1994, Issue 143) and multiple 2007 issues of Iron Man Magazine (January, July, and December). In 1996, he visited Quesnel, British Columbia after the Iron Ore Bodybuilding Classic in Prince George, British Columbia.

In 2018, he competed in several competitions at the National Physique Committee (NPC) level.

=== Contest results ===
- 1991 North American Championships – Light-HeavyWeight, 2nd
- 1992 North American Championships – Light-HeavyWeight, 2nd
- 1993 North American Championships – HeavyWeight, 1st
- 1995 Arnold Classic – 11th
- 1995 Florida Pro Invitational – 5th
- 1995 Ironman Pro Invitational – 6th
- 1995 Niagara Falls Pro Invitational – 17th
- 1995 San Jose Pro Invitational – 8th
- 1995 South Beach Pro Invitational – 5th
- 1996 Canada Pro Cup – 8th
- 1996 Florida Pro Invitational – 6th
- 1996 Night of Champions – 14th
- 1999 Night of Champions – 18th
- 1999 Toronto Pro – 9th
- 2000 Ironman Pro Invitational – 16th
- 2006 Europa Supershow – 16th

== Gym ownership ==
In July 2010, Fisher opened Dave Fisher's Powerhouse Gym in Torrance off Hawthorne Boulevard. It was four thousand square feet. Several months into the COVID-19 pandemic the gym opened in alleged violation of Los Angeles County public-health orders, resulting in fines and a temporary restraining order. The gym has served as the location for numerous Iron Man Magazine photo shoots, including sessions with Kyle Clarke (2018), T.J. Hoban (2016), Mike O'Hearn (2012), and Mark Dugdale (2012). In 2022, O'Hearn was interviewed at the gym by Muscle & Strength Magazine. The gym changed locations in January 2025.

== See also ==
- List of male professional bodybuilders
