= Ramesses Tlyakodugov =

Russian bodybuilder

Ramzez (Ramesses Tlyakodugov)
- Professional bodybuilder
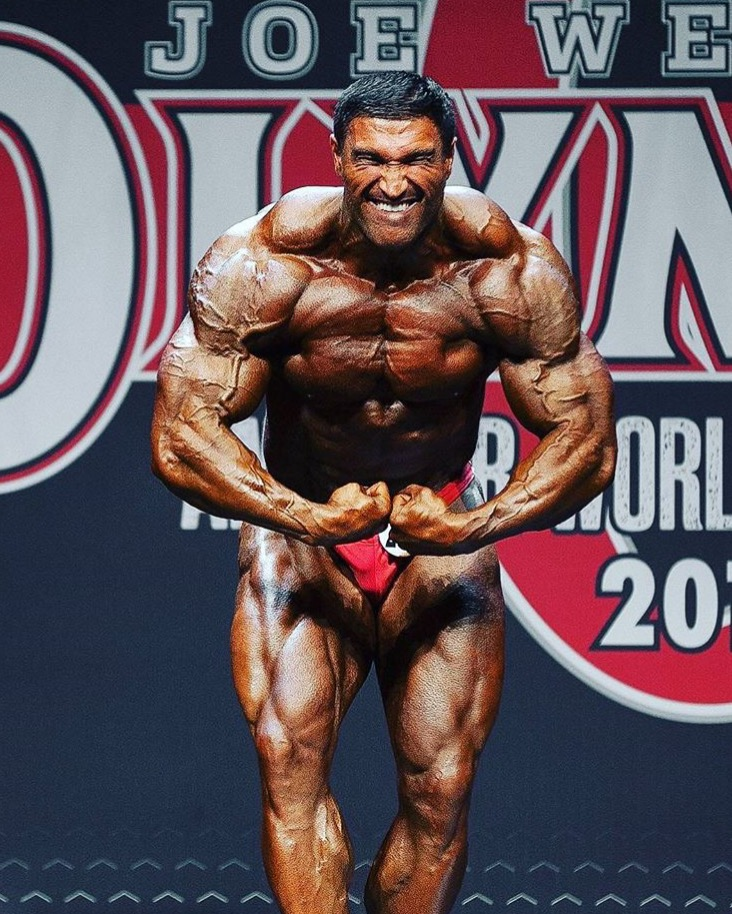

Personal info
- Born: 12 December 1976 (age 48); Nalchik, Circassia, Soviet Union

Best statistics
- Height: 179 cm (5 ft 10 in)
- Weight: 108 kg (238 lb)

Professional (Pro) career
- Pro-debut: 2008 IFBB Men's European BB & Classic BB Championships
- Best win: 2010 NABBA World Championships; 2010

Ramzes Tlyakodugov (rus. Рамзес Тлякодугов; born 12 December 1976) is a retired Russian (Circassian) bodybuilder and the winner of the prestigious NABBA World Championships bodybuilder title and Vice Mr. Universe (NABBA and NAC) and Vice champion the IFBB Men's European BB & Classic BB Championships.

== Achievements ==
- 2008: European Amateur Championships – IFBB, Super-HeavyWeight, 2nd;
- 2010: World Championships – NABBA, Medium-Tall, 1st;
- 2011: Mr Universe – NABBA, Tall, 2nd; Universe – NAC, Medium-Tall, 2nd;
- 2016: Mr Olympia Amateur -IFBB, 3rd;

== See also ==
- List of male professional bodybuilders
