= Alexandr Fedorov (bodybuilder) =

Russian bodybuilder (born 1978)

- Professional bodybuilder
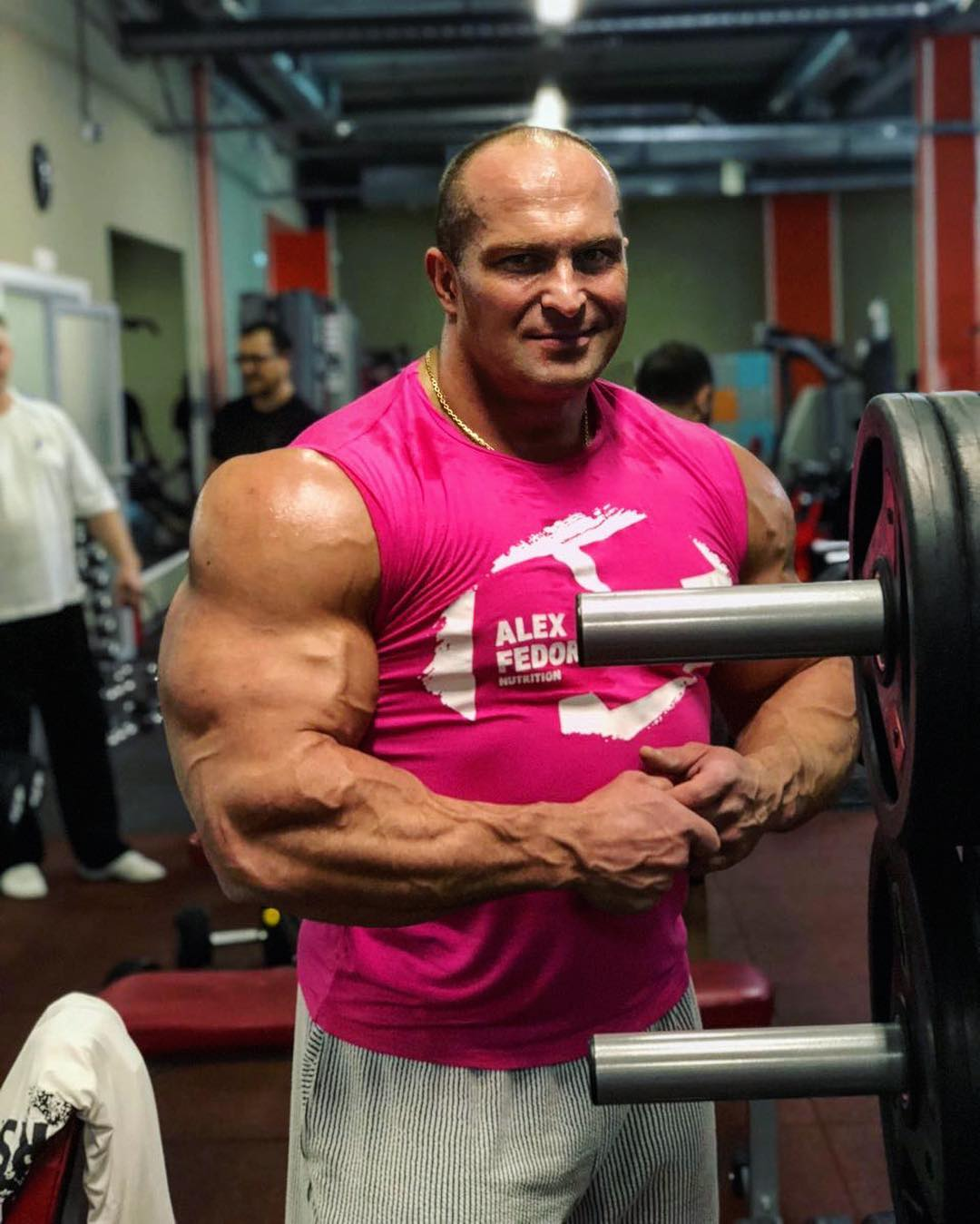

Personal info
- Born: 6 May 1978 (age 48); Saint-Petersburg, Russia

Best statistics
- Height: 185 cm (6 ft 1 in)
- Weight: 145 kg (320 lb)

Professional (Pro) career
- Pro-debut: 1996
- Active: 1996–2006, 2014–2019

Alexandr Fedorov (Russian: Александр Фёдоров) (born 6 May 1978) is an IFBB professional bodybuilder.

Fedorov earned his IFBB Pro Card after winning the 2003 IFBB European Amateur Championships. After competing in various Russian and other European professional bodybuilding competitions in 2003 and 2004 where he earned two top 3 finishes, including runner-up to Ronnie Coleman at the 2004 Grand Prix Russia, Alexander qualified for the 2005 Mr. Olympia, where he did not place. He also competed in the 2006 New York Pro, but did not place either.

During this time Fedorov was dealing with a torn pectoral muscle – an injury from September 2003 which would eventually force him to temporarily retire from bodybuilding.

Since 2014 Alexander has returned to professional bodybuilding and is actively training now.

Alexander currently resides in Russia with his wife Natalia, his daughter Veronica and his two young baby-twins.

== Competitive history ==
- 2003 European Amateur Championships, Super-HeavyWeight, 1st
- 2003 Grand Prix Russia, 3rd
- 2004 Grand Prix Russia, 2nd
- 2005 Mr. Olympia, Did not place
- 2006 New York Pro Championships, Did not place
- 2006 Grand Prix Austria, 10th
- 2014 Grand Prix Fitness House Pro, 8th
- 2015 Arnold Classic Europe, 12th
- 2015 Nordic Pro, 11th
- 2015 Orlando Pro Europa, 3rd

== See also ==
- List of male professional bodybuilders
