= Francisco 'Paco' Bautista =

Spanish bodybuilder

- Professional bodybuilder

Personal info
- Full name: Francisco 'Paco' Bautista
- Born: March 12, 1971 (age 55); Barcelona, Spain

Best statistics
- Height: 1.73 m (5 ft 8 in)
- Weight: 130 kg (290 lb)

Professional (Pro) career
- Active: 1999-2013

Francisco 'Paco' Bautista is an IFBB professional bodybuilder. Originally from Barcelona, Spain, he was born March 12, 1971.

Paco Bautista has competed in the highest echelons of American bodybuilding by placing 20th in the 2002 Mr. Olympia and 16th in the 2006 Mr. Olympia. Before entering the professional scene in the United States, Paco Bautista was reigning in the European circuit by placing first in two competitions in 1999, The European Amateur Championships and The World Amateur Championships. In the United States he placed 3rd in the Night of Champions competition in 2002 before competing for the first time in the Mr. Olympia competition later that year. Paco Bautista is best known for his highly developed lower body.

== Stats ==
- Height: 1.73 m (5 ft 8 in)
- Competition weight: 130 kg (290 lb)

== Competition history ==
- 1999 European Amateur Championships - IFBB, HeavyWeight, 1st
- 1999 World Amateur Championships - IFBB, HeavyWeight, 1st
- 2002 Grand Prix England - IFBB, 9th
- 2002 Grand Prix Holland - IFBB, 19th
- 2002 Night of Champions - IFBB, 3rd
- 2002 Olympia - IFBB, 20th
- 2002 Toronto Pro Invitational - IFBB, 6th
- 2005 New York Pro Championships - IFBB, 9th
- 2005 Toronto Pro Invitational - IFBB, 13th
- 2006 Santa Susanna Pro - IFBB, Winner
- 2006 Olympia - IFBB, 16th
- 2007 Europa Supershow - IFBB, Open, 7th
- 2007 New York Pro Championships - IFBB, 11th
- 2007 Olympia - IFBB, 16th
- 2007 Santa Susanna Pro - IFBB, Winner
- 2008 Houston Pro Invitational - IFBB, 12th
- 2008 New York Pro Championships - IFBB, Open, 9th
- 2009 New York Pro Championships - IFBB, Open, 12th
- 2009 Orlando Show of Champions - IFBB, 6th
- 2010 European Pro - IFBB, 3rd
- 2010 Tampa Bay Pro - IFBB, Open, 8th
- 2013 Arnold Classic Brazil - IFBB, 13th

== See also ==
- List of male professional bodybuilders
- List of female professional bodybuilders
- Mr. Olympia
- Arnold Classic
