= Tom Prince (bodybuilder) =

American bodybuilder (1968–2022)

Tom Prince (October 26, 1968 – February 5, 2022) was an American professional bodybuilder. Prince earned his IFBB pro card by winning the 1997 NPC National Championships (his only overall title) and remained competitive for five years, ending his career in 2002. His highest professional placing was at the 2001 Night of Champions, where he finished third.

Prince suffered from a rare kidney-related disease called focal segmental glomerulosclerosis, caused by either hereditary causes, obesity, drug abuse, or a combination thereof, forcing him to end his career relatively early. Prince received a kidney transplant in 2012; however, it failed two years later, requiring him to undergo dialysis thrice weekly for four hours per session.

After ending his bodybuilding career, Prince, together with his wife, ran a successful property management business.

Prince died of cancer-related complications on February 5, 2022, at the age of 53.

== Statistics ==
Height: 5 ft 8 in (1.73 m)

Competition Weight: 230 lb (100 kg)

Off Season Weight: 300–317 lb (136–144 kg)

== Competitive history ==
- 1995 NPC Nationals – Heavyweight – 2nd
- 1996 NPC Nationals – Heavyweight – 2nd
- 1996 NPC USA Championships – Heavyweight – 2nd
- 1997 NPC Nationals – Heavyweight and Overall – 1st
- 1997 NPC USA Championships – Heavyweight – 9th
- 1999 IFBB Night of Champions – 13th
- 2000 IFBB Ironman Pro Invitational – 9th
- 2001 IFBB Grand Prix England – 8th
- 2001 IFBB Night of Champions – 3rd
- 2001 Mr Olympia – 16th
- 2002 IFBB Night of Champions – 7th
- 2002 IFBB Southwest Pro Cup – 9th

== See also ==
- List of male professional bodybuilders
- List of female professional bodybuilders
