= Greg Kovacs =

Canadian bodybuilder (1968–2013)

- Professional bodybuilder
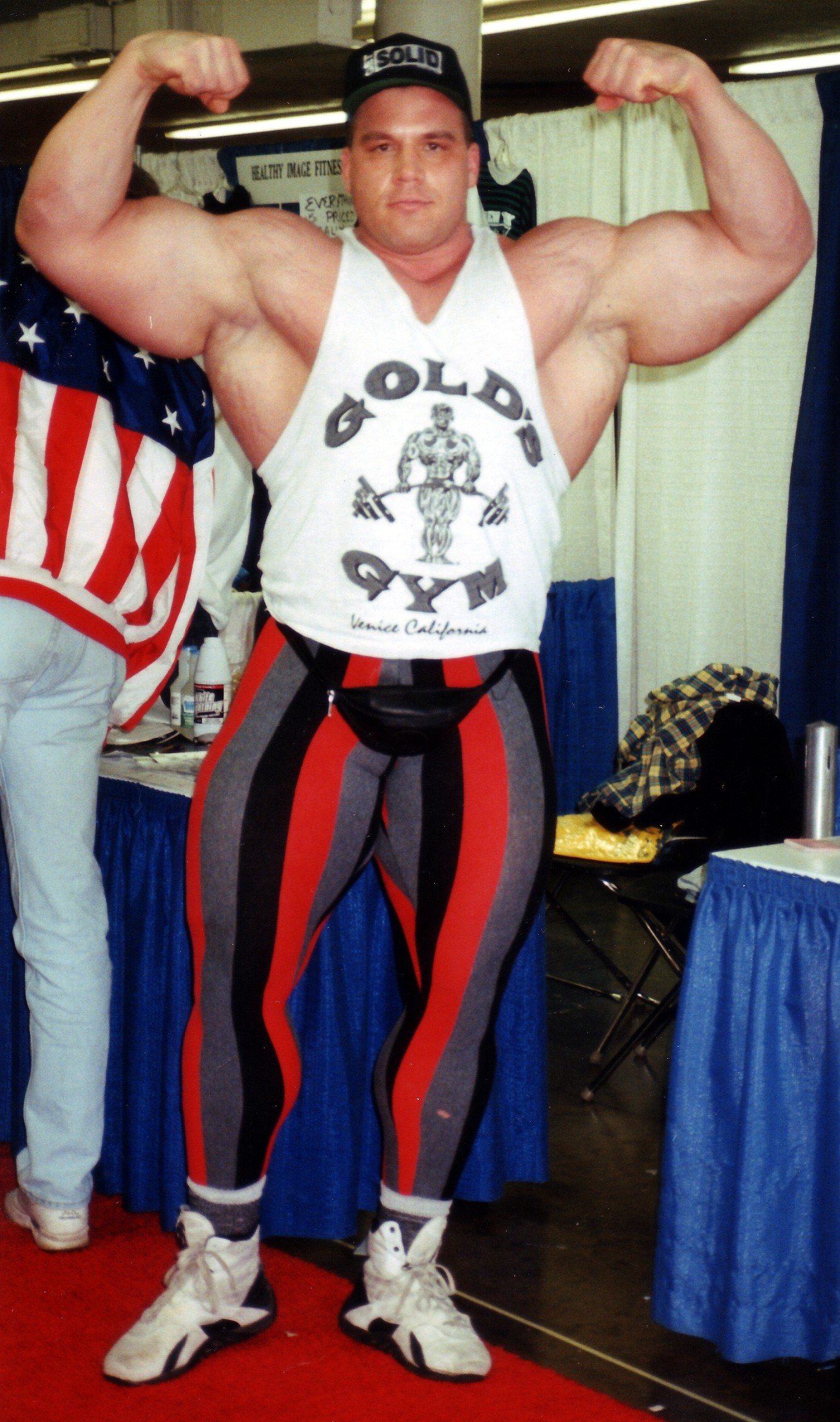

Personal info
- Born: December 16, 1968; Niagara Falls, Ontario, Canada
- Died: 22 November 2013 (aged 44); Mississauga, Ontario, Canada

Best statistics
- Height: 196 cm (6 ft 5 in)
- Weight: 155–165 kg (342–364 lb) (contest); 210 kg (460 lb) (off season)

Gregory Mark Kovacs (December 16, 1968 – November 22, 2013) was a Canadian IFBB professional bodybuilder. According to Canadian bodybuilding publication, Muscle Insider, Kovacs retired from competitive bodybuilding in 2005 to start his own business and coach competitive athletes.

== Early life ==
Kovacs was born and raised in Niagara Falls, Ontario, Canada. He studied electrical engineering for one year in college, played travelling hockey and soccer before concentrating on his bodybuilding pursuits.

== Bodybuilding ==
In the latter half of the 1990s, Greg Kovacs was the largest pro bodybuilder. According to Muscle Insider, his height was 6 ft 4 in (193 cm), his off-season weight was 420 lb (190,5 kg) and contest weight 330 lb (149,7 kg); his arms measured 25 in (63,5 cm), his chest (178 cm), and his legs 35 in (89 cm). He was reported to have developed arms more than 27 in (68,5 cm) in the prime of his career. Kovacs earned his IFBB Pro Card in 1996 and in June 1997, he appeared on the cover of Flex magazine.

== Later life and death ==
In November 2010, Kovacs was arrested and charged with extortion after a supplement store owner entered an Erin Mills bank to tell staff he was being extorted, and that a group of men had demanded he withdraw a large sum of money. No conviction was reported. He died two years later in his Mississauga condominium from a heart attack.

== Competition history ==
- 1996- Canadian National Championships, 1st
- 1997- IFBB Night of Champions, 16th
- 1998- IFBB Ironman Pro Invitational, 16th
- 2001- IFBB Night of Champions, Did not place
- 2004- Arnold Classic, 13th
- 2005- Toronto Pro Invitational, Did not place

== See also ==
- List of male professional bodybuilders
- List of female professional bodybuilders
- Mr. Olympia
