= Marko Savolainen =

Finnish bodybuilder (born 1973)

Marko "Supermass" Savolainen (born 13 February 1973) is a Finnish professional heavy-weight IFBB bodybuilder.

== Career ==
Savolainen, who was born in Oulu, Finland, retired in 2003, but made a comeback in 2006. First Savolainen was keen practitioner of Taekwondo which he began in his early teens and was a multiple master of the sport before becoming interested in bodybuilding. He won Finnish junior officials in his youth in the sport. He was also promising wrestler in youth heavyweight division. Switching to bodybuilding at age of 16, he weighed 120 kg or 270 lb in on-season shape, and boasted a pumped 24 in. arm. In the off season he weighed 310 lbs. at a height of 5 ft. 9 in. So far in his professional career, his best placing was in the 1997 IFBB Grand Prix Finland, resulting in 7th place. Marko also made a training DVD/video, titled Supermass—Return. In 2007, as a result of kidney failure, Marko left bodybuilding and started training and competing in kickboxing. In late November 2008, doctors said they had found him a kidney donor. He started bodybuilding again, saying he would be a natural bodybuilder, which means no use of anabolic steroids.

== Contest history ==
1992 Finnish Junior Championships, 2nd place, Middle Weight Class.
1992 Finnish Nationals, 7th place, Light - Heavy Weight Class.
1993 Finnish Jr. Nationals and National Champs., 1st place, Heavy Weight Class
1997 IFBB Finnish Pro, Grand Prix, 7th place.
1998 IFBB Finnish Pro, Grand Prix, 9th place.
2001 IFBB Ironman Pro Invitational, 12th place and IFBB San Francisco Pro, 8th place.

== Records ==
- Bench press: 260 kg or 575 lb
- Incline Bench press: 8 x 240 kg or 530 lb
- Smith-Squat: 8 x 360 kg or 790 lb
- Biceps curl: 8 x 120 kg or 265 lb

== See also ==
- List of male professional bodybuilders
