= Chris Cook (bodybuilder) =

American IFBB professional bodybuilder

Christopher Lee Cook (born September 1, 1976) is an American IFBB professional bodybuilder.

He served in the United States Air Force. Chris Cook's first bodybuilding competition was in 1996, where he placed 1st in the heavy weight division and Overall in the NPC (National Physique Committee) Mr. Anchorage. His first IFBB event was in The New York Cup of 2005, where he placed 6th. In 2006 he competed in the Arnold Classic and the Ironman Pro Invitational, both for the first time, and placed 15th and 10th respectively. Chris Cook has been featured in many fitness and bodybuilding articles, including being featured on the cover of FLEX magazine, Muscle and Fitness, MuscleMag International, and Muscular Development.

== Stats ==
- Height: 5'10
- Off-season weight: 295 lbs
- Competition weight: 250 lbs

== Contest history ==
- 1996 NPC Mr. Anchorage, 1st and Overall
- 1997 NPC Mr. Alaska, Heavyweight, 4th
- 1997 NPC Emerald Cup, Junior, 2nd
- 1999 NPC Mr. Alaska, Heavyweight, 1st
- 1999 NPC Emerals Cup, Heavyweight, 2nd
- 2000 NPC Sacramento, Heavyweight, 1st
- 2000 NPC Nationals, Heavyweight Did not place
- 2002 NPC California Championships, Super-Heavyweight, 3rd
- 2003 NPC USA Championships, Super-Heavyweight, 1st
- 2004 NPC Nationals, Super-Heavyweight, 1st and Overall
- 2004 NPC USA Championships, Super-Heavyweight, 1st
- 2005 New York Pro Championships, 6th
- 2005 Toronto Pro Invitational, 10th
- 2006 Arnold Classic, 15th
- 2006 Ironman Pro Invitational, 10th
- 2006 San Francisco Pro Invitational, 12th

== Filmography ==
- 2004: Malcolm in the Middle, episode Buseys Run Away as Nick, the bodybuilder

== See also ==
- List of male professional bodybuilders
- Arnold Classic
- Mr. Olympia
