= Toney Freeman =

American IFBB bodybuilder

- Professional bodybuilder
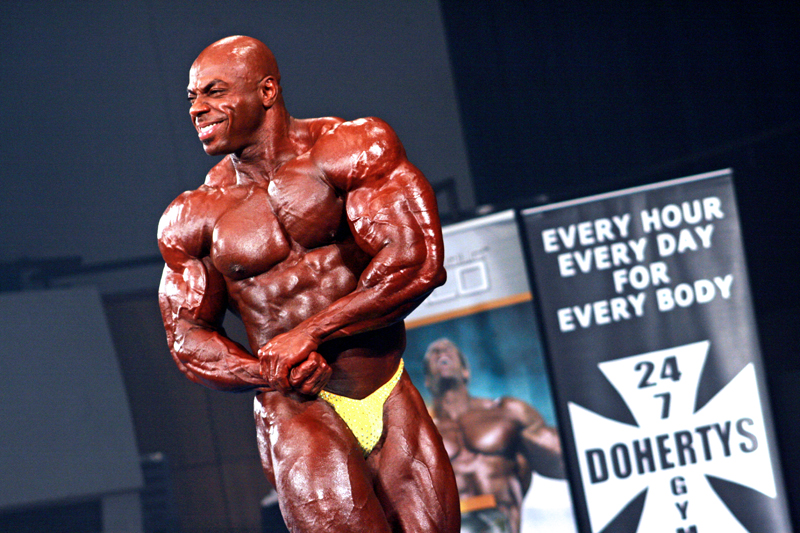
- 2009 IFBB Australian Pro Grand Prix VIII

Personal info
- Nickname: The X-Man
- Born: August 30, 1966 (age 59); South Bend, Indiana, U.S.

Best statistics
- Height: 6 ft 2 in (188 cm)
- Weight: 285 lb (129 kg) (Contest); 310 lb (141 kg) (Off-season)

Professional (Pro) career
- Pro-debut: 2002
- Best win: 2007 Sacramento Pro Champion; 1999–2003
- Predecessor: Gustavo Badell
- Successor: TBA
- Active: Retired 2013

Toney Freeman (born August 30, 1966) is an American IFBB professional bodybuilder and brand ambassador residing in Atlanta, Georgia.

== Biography ==
Freeman's nickname is The X-Man because his body characterizes the "X-frame" of classical bodybuilding: broad shoulders, narrow waist, and flaring thighs. He has been featured on the cover and pages of Flex, Muscular Development, and Musclemag. Freeman did not become a competitive bodybuilder until his late 30s because, for many years, it was a hobby and the sport was dominated by his idols Lee Haney and Dorian Yates.

It took Freeman many years to fill out his large frame and he was mentored by Dave Palumbo to become a professional. Freeman's first (National Physique Committee (NPC)) competition was in 1993, where he won the heavyweight class of the NPC Junior Nationals. His first IFBB event was the Night of Champions competition, where he placed 11th. His first Arnold Classic was in 2005, where he placed 10th. His first Ironman Pro Invitational was in 2006, where he placed 7th. His first Mr. Olympia appearance was in 2006, where he placed 7th. In 2007, he won the Ironman Pro and Sacramento Pro and placed 3rd at the Arnold Classic. He made the top 5 at the 2008 Mr. Olympia.

On December 8, 2010, during a visit to Sweden, Freeman was escorted by the police from Sundsvall while undertaking a promotional appearance in a local store. The police knew Freeman and other international bodybuilders were coming to Sweden for a fitness festival from promotional posters. According to Freeman, he was taken to the police station and was denied a legal representative and forced to give a urine sample. Reports allege that Freeman tested positive for testosterone, human growth hormone, and cannabis. He was released the same day with no charge. On December 31, 2010, Freeman responded to the allegations with an official statement and a video in which he emphasized he had not been treated properly by being denied an advocate or communication with the U.S. embassy.

Freeman became the first international professional bodybuilder to be detained by the Swedish police under "muscle profiling", a profiling method used by Swedish police in which suspicion of performance-enhancing drug use is based solely on physical appearance. The possession of such substances as steroids is illegal in Sweden. According to others who have been detained in this manner, police use the size and appearance of the bodybuilder to detain them, then aim to prove their case with blood or urine samples taken at the station. Police staff member Henrik Blusi generalized the actions taken against Freeman to all professional bodybuilders, saying: "If you are a professional bodybuilder you should not come to Sundsvall. We are very well informed here. We are currently conducting the largest doping trial in Europe, and then one should understand that we have an eye out for these things now."

== Stats ==
- Height: 6 ft 2 in (188 cm)
- Contest Weight: 295 pounds (134 kg)
- Off Season Weight: 310 pounds (141 kg)
- Waist: 32 in (79 cm)

== Competitive history ==
- 1990 AAU Junior Mr America, Tall, 4th
- 1993 NPC Junior Nationals, Heavyweight, 1st
- 1993 NPC Nationals, Heavyweight, 6th
- 1994 NPC Nationals, Heavyweight, 4th
- 1995 NPC Nationals, Heavyweight, 4th
- 2001 NPC Coastal USA Championships, Super-Heavyweight, 2nd
- 2001 NPC Nationals, Super-Heavyweight, 8th
- 2002 NPC Nationals, Super-Heavyweight, 1st and Overall
- 2003 IFBB Night of Champions, 11th
- 2003 IFBB Show of Strength Pro Championship, 9th
- 2004 IFBB Night of Champions, 10th
- 2004 IFBB Show of Strength Pro Championship, 8th
- 2005 IFBB Arnold Classic, 10th
- 2006 IFBB Arnold Classic, 9th
- 2006 IFBB Ironman Pro Invitational, 7th
- 2006 IFBB San Francisco Pro Invitational, 5th
- 2006 IFBB Europa Super Show, 1st
- 2006 IFBB Mr. Olympia, 7th
- 2007 IFBB Ironman Pro Invitational, 1st
- 2007 IFBB Sacramento Pro, 1st
- 2007 IFBB Arnold Classic, 3rd
- 2007 IFBB Mr. Olympia, 14th
- 2008 IFBB Ironman Pro Invitational, 8th
- 2008 IFBB Arnold Classic, 7th
- 2008 IFBB Australian Pro Grand Prix, 4th
- 2008 IFBB Tampa Bay Pro, 1st
- 2008 IFBB Europa Super Show, 1st
- 2008 IFBB Mr. Olympia, 5th
- 2009 IFBB Arnold Classic, 4th
- 2009 IFBB Australian Pro, 3rd
- 2009 IFBB Mr. Olympia, 8th
- 2010 IFBB Mr. Olympia, 9th
- 2010 IFBB Phoenix Pro, 3rd
- 2011 IFBB Arnold Classic, 9th
- 2011 IFBB British Grand Prix, 6th
- 2011 IFBB Mr Europe Grand Prix, 5th
- 2011 IFBB Hartford Europa Battle of Champions, 6th
- 2011 IFBB Europa Super Show (Dallas), 1st
- 2011 IFBB Mr. Olympia, 7th
- 2012 IFBB Arnold Classic Europe, 5th
- 2012 IFBB Mr. Olympia, 7th
- 2013 IFBB Arnold Classic, 3rd
- 2013 IFBB Mr. Olympia, 15th

== See also ==
- List of male professional bodybuilders
