= Nathan DeTracy =

American bodybuilder

Nathan DeTracy (born 1978) is an IFBB professional bodybuilder.

Standing 5'5" and averaging in weight at 182 pounds, DeTracy placed 16th as a light heavyweight in the 2006 USA NPC Bodybuilding & Figure Championships. Also in 2006, he placed seventh in the same weight class at the Los Angeles Bodybuilding, Fitness & Figure Championships. In 2007, he was the light heavyweight and overall winner in the Emerald Cup Championships.

For 2008, DeTracy changed his training routine and slimmed down to compete in the middleweight category. This strategy paid off when he took first place in that division in the 2008 NPC USA Championships. DeTracy won his pro card at the 2009 NPC Nationals, placing first in the middleweight class.

Outside of competition, DeTracy owns Evolution Fitness in Bellevue, Washington. He has also made guest posing appearances at bodybuilding and fitness expos.
