= Carlos G. Duque =

Professional bodybuilder

- Professional bodybuilder

Personal info
- Born: June 13, 1973 (age 52); Cali, Colombia

Best statistics
- Height: 6 ft 0 in (1.83 m)

Professional (Pro) career
- Pro-debut: IFBB Hurricane Pro; 2019
- Best win: NPC Teen Collegiate & Masters National Championships - 1st Place; 2019

Carlos G. Duque (born June 13, 1973 in Cali, Colombia) is an actively competing International Federation of Bodybuilding and Fitness professional bodybuilder.

== Background ==
Carlos was born in Cali, Colombia, and moved to the United States when he was 19 years old. He currently resides in Atlanta, Georgia. Carlos is currently competing in the IFBB's Men's Physique Bodybuilding Division.

== Bodybuilding career ==
He entered his first bodybuilding competition, the Arnold Amateur in Columbus, OH in 2012.

Notable amateur regionals and nationals include the National Physique Committee East Coast Championships (2014), NPC Teen Collegiate & Masters National Championships (2015, 2017, 2018, 2019), NPC Coastal USA (2015), NPC Eastern Seaboard Classic (2016), NPC Charlotte Cup (2016), NPC Junior Nationals Bodybuilding, Fitness & Figure Championships (2016), and the Olympia Amateur (2017).

After 10 years of focused weight training he was able to achieve professional status by winning the Nspire Sports League (NSL) Atlanta South East Open in 2016. His first professional appearance was in 2016 when he competed in the NSL Fit Sport World Championships. He then earned his IFBB pro card by placing first in the NPC Teen Collegiate & Masters National Championships professional qualifier in Pittsburgh 2019. His first PRO debut as an IFBB was when he competed in the IFBB Hurricane Pro competition in 2019. As of November 2019, his Professional Championship competitions include the Fit Sport World Championships (2016), IFBB Pro Hurricane (2019), and the IFBB Classic Masters Pro (2019).

Carlos has been featured in many fitness websites including the American fitness and bodybuilding magazine MuscularDevelopment.com and the National Physique Committee's premier online news command center - NPCnewsonline.com

He is married and has three children.

== Contest history ==
=== Professional Championships ===
Year	Competition	Division	Location	Date	Placement
2019	IFBB Classic Masters Pro	Masters Over 40	Baltimore, MD	October 27, 2019	5th
2019	IFBB Hurricane Pro	Men's Physique Masters Over 40	Clearwater, FL	September 21, 2019	6th
2016	NSL Fit Sport World Championships	Athletic Physique – Open	Houston, TX	November 2016	3rd

== Amateur competitions ==
=== National ===
Year	Competition	Division	Location	Date	Placement
2019	NPC Teen Collegiate & Masters National Championships	Masters Over 45 Class E	Pittsburgh, PA	July 17, 2019	1st
2018	NPC North American Championships	Men's Physique Masters Over 40 Class E	Pittsburgh, PA	August 8, 2018	12th
2018	NPC Teen Collegiate & Masters National Championships	Men's Physique Masters Over 40 Class E	Pittsburgh, PA	July 7, 2018	5th
2017	NPC Olympia Amateur	Physique: Classic C	Las Vegas, NV	Sep. 14, 2017	7th
2017	NPC Teen Collegiate & Masters National Championships	Men's Physique Masters Over 40 Class E	Pittsburgh, PA	July 7, 2017	7th
2016	NSL Atlanta South East Open	Athletic Physique – Masters Over 40	Atlanta, GA	October 1, 2016	1st
2016	NPC Junior Nationals Bodybuilding, Fitness & Figure Championships	Physique: Men Classic Physique - Class C	Chicago, IL	Jun. 16, 2016 - Jun. 18, 2016	13th
2015	NPC Teen Collegiate & Masters National Championships	Physique: Men - Over 40 - Class E	Pittsburgh, PA	Jul. 16, 2015 - Jul. 18, 2015	8th
2012	NPC Arnold Amateur	Men's Physique: Tall	Columbus, OH	Mar. 1, 2012 - Mar. 4, 2012	-

=== Regional ===
Year	Competition	Division	Location	Date	Placement
2016	NPC Charlotte Cup	Masters Men's Physique 40+	Charlotte, NC	April 23, 2016	4th
2015	NPC Coastal USA	Men's Physique	Duluth, GA	August 2015	3rd
2016	NPC Eastern Seaboard Classic	Men's Classic Physique Class C	Duluth, GA	March 2015	2nd
2014	NPC East Coast Championships	Physique: Over 35	Wayne, NJ	Nov. 15, 2014	2nd
