= Michael Johnson (bodybuilder) =

Canadian IFBB professional bodybuilder (born 1981)

- professional bodybuilder

Personal info
- Born: August 25, 1981 (age 43); Halifax, Nova Scotia, Canada

Best statistics
- Height: 5 ft 10 in (178 cm)
- Weight: Contest: 235–245 lb (107–111 kg)

Michael Johnson (born August 25, 1981) is a Canadian IFBB professional bodybuilder. He won the title of Mr. World Canada in 2011.

== Biography ==
Early in his life, Johnson admired the physiques of professional wrestlers and developed a love for bodybuilding. At age 17, he was nicknamed "Tiny" due to being only 5 ft 8 in (1.73 m) and weighing 135 lb (61 kg). Over the course of a year, Johnson gained 30 lbs of muscle. In January 1999, he joined the Canadian Infantry Reserves before later choosing to study for a college degree in Kinesiology in September 1999.

Johnson entered his first bodybuilding contest in 2002 where he took 1st Place at the Mens Junior Atlantic Championships. He earned his IFBB Pro card in 2011 when he won the Canadian National Championships in the Mens Superheavyweight Class. He is now a teacher for general employment in Cathey Middle School.

== Competitive record ==
=== Bodybuilding ===
- 2013 Toronto Pro Supershow – 15th
- 2013 New York Pro - 15th place (pro debut)
- 2011 Canadian National Championships Mens Super Heavyweight - 1st and overall winner
- 2009 Nova Scotia Provincial Mens Heavyweight - 1st and overall winner
- 2009 Atlantic Championships Mens Heavyweight - 1st
- 2006 Nova Scotia Provincial Mens Heavyweight - 1st
- 2006 Atlantic Championships Mens Heavyweight - 1st
- 2005 Nova Scotia Provincial Mens Light Heavyweight - 2nd
- 2005 Atlantic Championships Mens Light Heavyweight - 4th
- 2004 Nova Scotia Provincial Mens Middleweight - 3rd
- 2004 Atlantic Championships Mens Light Heavyweight - 1st
- 2002 Nova Scotia Provincial Mens Junior Middleweight - 1st and overall winner
- 2002 Atlantic Championships Mens Junior (One Class) - 1st

=== Power Lifting ===
- 2012 CPA Canadian Championships RAW 1st (242 lb weight class), Best Overall RAW Lifter, Canadian RAW records Squat – 610 lbs, Deadlift – 650 lbs
- 2008 CPU National Powerlifting & Bench Press Championship: 4th place (110 kg class)
- 2008 CPU Nova Scotia Provincials - 1st (110 kg class)
- 2007 CPU National Bench Press Championship: 2nd place (110 kg class)
- 2007 CPU Nova Scotia Provincials: 1st place (110 kg class)
