= Jim Badra =

Greek bodybuilder

- Professional bodybuilder

Personal info
- Nickname: Mr. World
- Born: April 5, 1961 (age 65); Greece

Best statistics
- Height: 6 ft 1 in (185 cm)
- Weight: 270 lb (122 kg)

Professional (Pro) career
- Pro-debut: Reno, NV; 1st Place

Jim Badra (born April, 1961 in Greece) is a Greek and Jordanian American former professional bodybuilder, businessman, investor, and spokesperson for health and nutrition. Badra competed in bodybuilding and became a Mr. World Champion in 1988. He was featured on the cover of Muscular Development magazine.

Badra began weight training at the age of 19. He won the Mr Western USA title at age 24 and went on to win the Mr. World title and became Bodybuilder of the Year in 1988. Badra remains active in the bodybuilding world and gives seminars on nutrition and health around the world.

At the end of an interview covered and published in 1986, Badra was quoted saying that when he decides to finally leave competitive bodybuilding he wants to help kids. This decision is continued through a company he co-founded called LHT Revolution, where continues that focus of helping kids and adults through nutrition and exercise program.

== Early life ==
Badra came to the United States with his family from Jordan when he was 9 years old and moved to Saint Paul, Minnesota. He learned to speak English by watching shows like Sesame Street.

== Bodybuilding career ==
Competition record

Men's Bodybuilding

Representing (United States)

Mr. World
1st	1988

Mr. America
3rd	1989

Mr. Universe
2nd	1989

Being a foreigner in middle America, Jim Badra was inspired to become a body builder due to bullying and the cultural separation of being a foreigner in a white American school. It was observed that top bodybuilders gained the respect and admiration of Americans. As a foreigner trying to fit in, Badra saw his opportunity of being a great American through bodybuilding. This venture became a family affair according to the article "Body Builder's quest for fame and glory is a family affair".

At age 19, he started lifting heavy weights. He devoted himself to becoming a World Champion bodybuilder, after gaining recognitions from some prestigious amateur bodybuilding contest. In 1984, he won the heavyweight division at the Super Bowl of Bodybuilding in Anaheim.

His amateur bodybuilding titles include 1985 Gold's Classic in Reno, Nevada, the 1985 Super Boal of Bodybuilding in San Jose, and Mr. Western USA in Alameda.

After competing in the Mr America contest, Badra turned professional and set his eyes on winning the biggest of all bodybuilding contests, Mr. Olympia. An article published in 1986 quotes Badra saying "I want to make money, get well known, get my picture in magazines and be the biggest and the best ever!"

Badra lived and trained in Northern California. Laura Dayton, journalist for Muscular Development, states "I've known him since his Mr. World win. He is a Hard trainer, a superior physique athlete and more importantly, a hell of a nice guy with a genuinely positive attitude about the sport, it's [sic] future and his role in that future." She goes on to say "Jim is soft-spoken in an interview, but he has mastered bringing excitement and his unique charisma to the stage."

Adrian Vore, journalist for the Times Tribune (Tribune Media Services), describes Badra as having ham-sized arms and a back the size of a California condor's wingspan in an article published by the Peninsula News.

=== Competitive stats ===
- Height: 6 ft 0 in (1.83 m)
- Competitive weight: 265 lbs
- Off-season weight: 290 lbs

=== Competitive history ===
- 1984 Superbowl of Bodybuilding IV - Heavyweight winner
- 1985 Superbowl of Bodybuilding - Heavyweight winner
- 1985 Gold's Classic - Heavyweight winner
- 1985 Mr. Western U.S.A - Heavyweight winner (with Most Muscular, Most Symmetrical)
- 1986 California Gold Cup - Heavyweight winner (with Most Muscular)
- 1988 Mr America Championship - Heavyweight Third Place
- 1988 Mr Universe Championship - Heavyweight Third Place
- 1988 Mr World Invitational - Heavyweight winner
- 1988 Bodybuilder of the Year - Overall
- 1989 Mr Universe Championship - Heavyweight Third Place
- 1989 Mr America Championship - Heavyweight Second Place

== U.S. foreign relations ==
Badra became a celebrity to the Middle East, as one of the first Middle Easterners to win a national heavyweight bodybuilding title. During the Reagan administration to the Bush administration, the middle east conflicts where intensifying. Jim Badra was a symbol of hope for many- according to Arab Press article published in 1989. Jimmy continues to help many, both in the US and abroad. Most recently focusing on US veterans.

== Publications ==
- Featured on the cover of Muscular Development
- Featured on GNC National Ad "Recuperation" bodybuilder: Jim Badra photographer: Kelly O'Connor

== Television ==
- ITV Sports
- CKRD-TV
