= Edson Prado =

Brazilian bodybuilder and personal trainer

Edson Prado is a Brazilian professional bodybuilder and personal trainer. His wife, Jane, is a professional fitness competitor.

In 2006, he appeared on WWE Raw, in a taped vignette in which he helped Triple H train in preparation for his WWE Championship match against John Cena at Wrestlemania 22.

== Personal information ==
When Prado was 16 years old, he met a friend that was into weight lifting. This exact friend took Prado to the gym for the first time and he continued to go to this gym for many years. After 19 years, the two realized that they would have been able to compete in body building. At the time, Prado's family did not approve of him competing.

== Shows participated in ==
- 2006 IFBB Atlantic City Pro: 22nd place
- 2006 IFBB New York Pro
- 2006 IFBB Shawn Ray Colorado Pro: 13th place
- 2005 IFBB Europa Super Show
- 2004 IFBB Night of Champions

== Titles Won ==
- 2000 IFBB South American Champion
- 2002 NABBA Mr. World
