= Mohammad Bannout =

Lebanese bodybuilder (born 1976)

Mohammad Bannout محمد علي بنوت
- Professional bodybuilder

Personal info
- Nickname: Moe
- Born: December 17, 1976 (age 49); Lebanon

Best statistics
- Height: 5 ft 10 in (178 cm)
- Weight: 238–265 lb (108–120 kg)

Professional (Pro) career
- Pro-debut: Ironman Pro Invitational - IFBB; 2009
- Best win: Europa Phoenix - IFBB, 1st; 2014

Mohammad Ali Bannout (محمد علي بنوت; born 17 December 1976, in Beirut, Lebanon), informally referred to as Moe Bannout, is a Lebanese IFBB professional bodybuilder.

== Competitive statistics ==
- Age: 49
- Height: 1.78 m
- Competitive weight: 108 kg
- Off Competitive weight : 120 kg

== Competitive history ==
- 2002, The Hero of Heroes of Lebanon
- 2003, The Hero of Heroes of Lebanon
- 2004, The Hero of Heroes of Lebanon
- 2005, The Hero of Heroes of Lebanon
- 2005, Arab Bodybuilding Championship, Jordan, 5th
- 2006, Arab Bodybuilding Championship, Jordan
- 2007, IFBB World Amateur Bodybuilding Championships, Light Heavyweight, 3rd
- 2009, IFBB Ironman Pro Invitational, 7th
- 2010, IFBB Phoenix Pro, Open, 10th
- 2014, IFBB Phoenix Pro, Open, 1st
- 2015, IFBB Mr Olympia, Open, 16th

== See also ==
- IFBB Professional League
- List of male professional bodybuilders
