= Radosław Słodkiewicz =

Polish bodybuilder

- Born: June 11, 1976 (age 49); Goleniów, Poland
- Occupation: Body builder

Radosław Słodkiewicz (born June 11, 1976) is a Polish body builder. He made his debut in 1992 in the Grand Prix in Szczecin.

== Achievements ==
- 1996 - first place in the junior classification
- 2000 - fourth place in the Polish championships
- 2002 - winner of Polish Championship

== Details ==
- chest 140 cm
- biceps 52 cm
- waist 87 cm
- thigh 80 cm
- calf 51 cm
- weight 110 kilos, 120 kg off season
