= Ahmad Haidar =

Lebanese bodybuilder (born 1968)

Ahmad Ali Haidar (born April 10, 1968) is an IFBB professional bodybuilder.

Ahmad is nicknamed "Abzilla" due to his developed abdominals. He first started competing in professional bodybuilding in 1997 by competing in the World Championships, where he placed first. His first IFBB competition was the Mr. Olympia of 1998, where he placed 16th. In 2000, he competed in his first Arnold Classic, placing 12th. Two years later, in 2002, he competed in another Mr. Olympia, placing 13th. He took a short break in competition after 2007 and returned early 2009 and placed fifth at the Ironman Pro Invitational, which qualifies him for the 2009 Mr. Olympia.

Ahmad has been featured in many fitness and bodybuilding articles, as well as being featured on the cover of Muscular Development magazine. He currently resides in Beirut, Lebanon.

== Competitive stats ==
- Age: 57
- Height: 5'6"
- Off Season Weight: 225 lb
- Competition Weight: 215 lb

== Contest history ==
Year Competition Placing

- 1997 World Championships Light Heavyweight & Overall, 1st – Best Improved
- 1998 Mr. Olympia 16th
- 1999 Ironman Pro Invitational, 9th
- 2000 Ironman Pro Invitational, 10th
- 2000 Arnold Schwarzenegger Classic, 12th
- 2002 Arnold Schwarzenegger Classic 6th
- 2002 Mr. Olympia 13th
- 2003 Arnold Classic 7th
- 2003 Ironman Pro Invitational 7th
- 2003 San Francisco Pro Invitational 6th
- 2004 Arnold Classic, 9th
- 2004 Florida Pro Xtreme Challenge, 2nd
- 2004 Ironman Pro Invitational, 4th
- 2004 Night of Champions, 4th
- 2004 Mr. Olympia, 13th
- 2004 San Francisco Pro Invitational, 5th
- 2004 Show of Strength Pro Championship, 9th
- 2005 New York Pro Championships, 2nd
- 2005 Toronto Pro Invitational, 3rd
- 2006 Arnold Classic, 12th
- 2006 Ironman Pro Invitational, 9th
- 2006 San Francisco Pro Invitational, 6th
- 2007 Ironman Pro Invitational, 8th
- 2007 Sacramento Pro Championships, 4th
- 2009 Ironman Pro Invitational, 5th
- 2009 Arnold Classic, 12th

== See also ==
- List of male professional bodybuilders
- Mr. Olympia
- Arnold Classic
