= Peter Putnam (bodybuilder) =

American bodybuilder (born 1976)

Peter Matthew Putnam
- Born: 6 August 1976 (age 49); Dalton, Georgia, U.S.
- Occupations: Bodybuilder; fitness spokesmodel; celebrity trainer; recording artist
- Years active: 2004–present
- Known for: 2004 NPC Collegiate Nationals Champion; 2007 NPC USAs Light-heavyweight Champion; 2008 NPC Nationals Light-heavyweight Champion; Appearing in bodybuilding magazines and on MTV’s MADE
- Notable work: We Didn't Want Your War (single); * The Shadowlands (album)

Peter Matthew Putnam (born August 6, 1976 in Dalton, Georgia), is an American IFBB professional bodybuilder, fitness spokesmodel, and celebrity trainer. He is the 2004 NPC Collegiate Nationals Champion, the 2007 NPC USAs Light-Heavyweight Champion, and the 2008 NPC Nationals Light-Heavyweight Champion. Putnam has appeared in many worldwide bodybuilding publications and been featured on covers such as Muscle and Fitness and FLEX. He has also appeared as a MADE Coach on MTV and a cover model on Jeff Foxworthy's 2000 album Big Funny.

In addition to his career as a bodybuilder, Putnam is a recording artist. His single, "We Didn't Want Your War," is an anthem about the war in Ukraine, written to raise support for the Ukrainian people. Putnam has also released a full-length album entitled The Shadowlands. Both releases were recorded at the American Recording Studio in Memphis, Tennessee. "Black Raven", a track off The Shadowlands, is a tribute to Loretta Lynn that was recorded the day after the country music star died.
