= Dennis Wolf =

German bodybuilder

- Professional bodybuilder
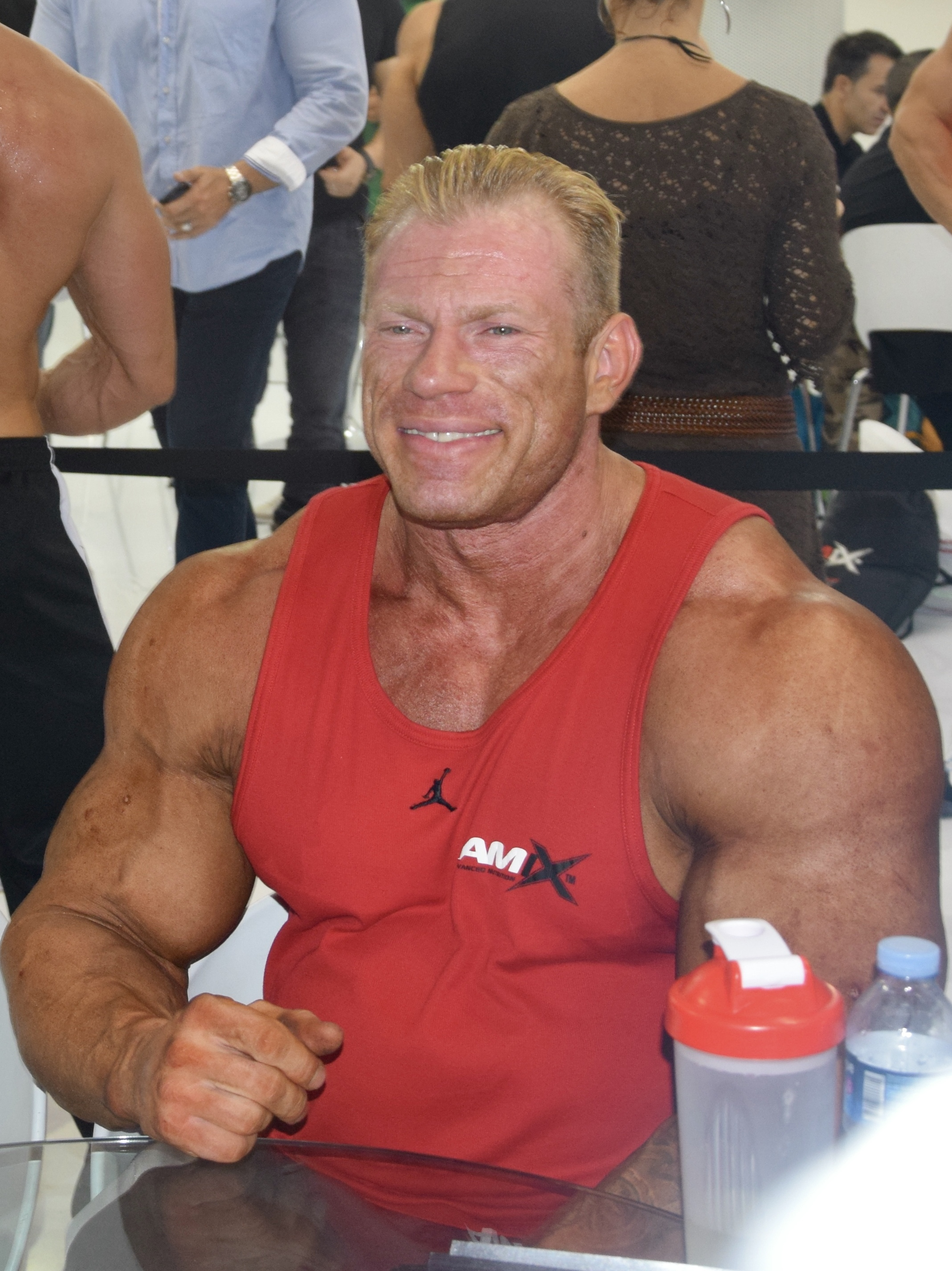

Personal info
- Nickname: Big Bad Wolf
- Born: October 30, 1978 (age 47); Tokmok, Soviet Union (now Kyrgyzstan)

Best statistics
- Height: 5 ft 11 in (180 cm)
- Weight: 230–275 lb (104–125 kg) (contest); 300–315 lb (136–143 kg) (off-season)

Professional (Pro) career
- Pro-debut: World Amateur Championships; 2006
- Best win: Arnold Classic; 2014
- Predecessor: Dexter Jackson

Dennis Wolf (ger. Dennis Wolf, rus. Деннис Вольф, born October 30, 1978) is a Soviet-born German IFBB professional bodybuilder.

== Biography ==
Wolf was born to a German family in Tokmok in the Soviet Union (now in Kyrgyzstan). From 1989 to 1992, he resided in the Russian town of Topki. In 1992, he moved to the German town of Marl. Wolf took up martial arts, which led to his interest in weight training and bodybuilding. Later on, he decided to focus on bodybuilding and became a professional in 2005.

Wolf is known for his small waist and big outer quad sweep. He received 4th place in the 2015 Mr. Olympia, and was the 2014 Arnold Classic champion.

== Personal life ==
Wolf is fluent in English, German, and Russian. He is also making a video about bodybuilding in the Russian language for his Russian speaking fans. From 2009-25, Wolf resided in Las Vegas with his wife. In 2025, he moved to Russia and announced that he and his wife had decided to divorce each other and that another person had "appeared in my life".

== Competitive history ==
=== Professional results ===
- 2018 Arnold Classic – 12th place
- 2015 EVL's Prague Pro – 4th place
- 2015 Mr. Olympia – 4th place
- 2014 San Marino Pro – 2nd place
- 2014 EVLS Prague Pro – 1st place
- 2014 Arnold Classic Europe – 1st place
- 2014 Mr. Olympia – 4th place
- 2014 Arnold Classic – 1st place
- 2013 Arnold Classic Europe – 3rd place
- 2013 Mr. Olympia – 3rd place
- 2012 EVLS Prague Pro – 1st place
- 2012 Arnold Classic Europe 2012 – 2nd place
- 2012 Mr. Olympia – 6th place
- 2012 Arnold Classic – 2nd place
- 2011 Sheru Classic – 5th place
- 2011 Mr. Olympia – 5th place
- 2011 Australian Pro – 1st place
- 2011 Arnold Classic – 2nd place
- 2011 Flex Pro – 4th place
- 2010 Mr. Olympia – 5th place
- 2010 NY Pro – 3rd place
- 2009 Mr. Olympia – 16th place
- 2008 Mr. Olympia – 4th place
- 2007 Mr. Olympia – 5th place
- 2007 Keystone Pro Classic – 1st place
- 2007 New York Pro – 3rd place
- 2006 Mr. Olympia – 16th place
- 2006 Grand Prix Spain – 3rd place
- 2006 Montreal Pro Championships – 5th place
- 2006 Europa Supershow – 7th place

=== Amateur results ===
- 2005 IFBB World Championship – 1st place and overall winner
- 2005 WM-Qualifikation (IFBB) – 1st place
- 2005 46 Deutsche Meisterschaft (IFBB) – 1st place heavyweight and overall winner
- 2005 NRW-Landesmeisterschaft (IFBB)–- 1st place heavyweight and overall winner
- 2005 Int. Hessischer Heavyweight Champion-Pokal – 2nd place
- 2004 Deutsche Meisterschaft (Germering) (IFBB) – 2nd place
- 2004 NRW-Landesmeisterschaft (IFBB) – 1st place heavyweight and overall winner
- 2002 Belgium Grand Prix – 1st
- 2002 Mr. Universum (WPF) – Vice World Champion heavyweight
- 2000 Internationale Deutsche Meisterschaft (IFBB) – 4th place heavyweight
- 2000 NRW-Landesmeisterschaft (IFBB) – 1st place heavyweight and overall winner
- 1999 NRW-Landesmeisterschaft (IFBB) – 4th place heavyweight
- 1999 Multipowerpokal (IFBB) – 4th place heavyweight
- 1999 Newcomer (IFBB) – 2nd place heavyweight
