= Mark Harris (bodybuilder) =

Welsh bodybuilder

Mark Harris (born Neath) is an IFBB professional bodybuilder from Wales. He is six times UKBFF Welsh champion and overall UKBFF (formerly EFBB) British champion of 2001. He nearly won the overall UKFBB British bodybuilding Championships in 2000 but was pipped to the post by Mike King. In 2001, a "shredded" Mark became overall British champion as a middleweight and turned pro. He made his pro debut in the English Grand Prix several weeks later.

Mark is currently sponsored by the bodybuilding supplement company Chemical Nutrition. (originally Chemical Warfare, now CNP Professional), owned by Kerry Kayes (and formerly Dorian Yates). He is a well known bodybuilder in the UK.
