= Marcus Haley =

- Professional bodybuilder

Personal info
- Nickname: Haley's Comet
- Born: October 5, 1972 (age 53); Las Vegas, Nevada, U.S.

Best statistics
- Height: 5 ft 7 in (170 cm)
- Weight: 265 lb (120 kg)

Professional (Pro) career
- Pro-debut: 2006 Atlantic City Pro; 2005
- Best win: 2005 NPC Nationals, 1st Place (Super Heavyweight)
- Predecessor: Mark Dugdale
- Successor: Desmond Miller
- Active: 1997-2010

Marcus Haley (born Marcus Haley October 5, 1972 in Las Vegas, Nevada, U.S.) is an IFBB American bodybuilder. He most referred as Haley's Comet. Before touching weights, Marcus was taking care of his four little brothers while his mother was fighting a bout of drug abuse. An outstanding running back and defensive back at Pahrump High School, he earned a scholarship to Dakota Wesleyan University. He attended Dakota Wesleyan University for two years, but after encountering a lot a racism he returned home. Haley admits that he always looked up to Shawn Ray and Mike Ashley as a youth. While in Las Vegas, Haley started training at Gold's Gym and met a female bodybuilder named Gabby. His first show was the Golds Gym Classic in Las Vegas. Not knowing how to diet, he ate hamburger patties from McDonald's. Carb loading was done with rice and French fries. He placed third in the show.

He earned his IFBB pro card by placing 1st in the Super Heavyweight division in the 2005 USA Bodybuilding/Figure Championships. He was outdone by Phil Heath, who won the overall in that show.

In 2007, he entered the Ironman Pro and placed 5th, which gives him is first bid at the 2007 Mr. Olympia.

As well as his 2007 Arnold Classic placing, Haley won the "Best Poser" award.

Haley currently resides in Peoria, Arizona, where he runs a contest prep / lifestyle fitness group called Team Comet Fitness. #teamcomet

== Vital statistics ==
Height: 5'9

Contest weight: 245 lb

Off-season weight: 265 lb

Arms: 22in.

Chest: 52in.

Waist: 32in.

Thighs: 30in.

Calves:22in.

== Bodybuilding Placings ==
- 2010 Mr. Olympia - 13th
- 2010 Orlando Pro - 2nd
- 2009 Ironman - 9th
- 2008 Injured - Torn Quad Tendon
- 2007 Olympia - 16th
- 2007 Arnold Classic - 12th
- 2007 Sacramento Pro - 5th
- 2007 Ironman Pro - 5th (**Qualified for Mr. Olympia)
- 2006 Europa Super Show - 8th
- 2006 Atlantic City Pro - 4th
- 2006 Colorado Pro - 4th
- 2005 Mr. North America - 1st and Overall
- 2005 USA Bodybuilding/Figure Championships - 1st (Super Heavyweight)
- 2004 USA Bodybuilding/Figure Championships - 3rd (Super Heavyweight)
- 2003 National Bodybuilding/Figure Championships - 7th (Heavyweight)
- 2002 USA Bodybuilding/Figure Championships - 2nd (Heavyweight)
- 2001 USA Bodybuilding/Figure Championships - 3rd (Heavyweight)
- 1999 NPC National Championships - (PLACE UNKNOWN)
- 1999 Las Vegas Classic - 2nd
- 1998 NPC National Championships - (PLACE UNKNOWN)
- 1997 Golds Gym Classic - 3rd (Middleweight)

== DVDs ==
- Quest for the Comet

== See also ==
- List of male professional bodybuilders
- List of female professional bodybuilders
- Mr. Olympia
- Arnold Classic
