= David Henry (bodybuilder) =

American bodybuilder (born 1975)

David Henry (born February 24, 1975, in Denver, Colorado) is an American International Federation of BodyBuilders (IFBB) professional bodybuilder. Henry is a Master Sgt. (E-7) in the United States Air Force. He lives in Tucson, Arizona. Henry is the first 202-212 division Mr Olympia winner.

== Career ==
At age 17, David started training with weight for his track & field events and competed his first bodybuilding competition, the Team Muscle Tech Challenge, where he won. His first National Physique Committee (NPC) competition was in the 2001 NPC Nationals, where he placed 11th in the middleweight division. His first IFBB competition was the Florida Pro Xtreme Challenge of 2004, where he placed 10th. His first Ironman Pro Invitational was in the same year, where he placed 6th. His first Arnold Classic was in 2005, where he placed 12th. He competed in his first Mr. Olympia later that year, where he placed 14th. In 2008, Henry placed 15th at the Mr Olympia but went on to winning the first 202 Mr Olympia division title.

== Stats ==
- Height: 5'5"
- Contest Weight: 203 lbs.
- Off-Season Weight: 235 lbs.

== Competitive history ==
- 2001 NPC Nationals, Middleweight, 11th
- 2002 NPC Nationals, Middleweight, 1st
- 2002 NPC USA Championships, Middleweight, 2nd
- 2004 Florida Pro Xtreme Challenge, 10th
- 2004 Ironman Pro Invitational, 6th
- 2004 San Francisco Pro Invitational, 8th
- 2005 Arnold Classic, 12th
- 2005 Europa Supershow, 4th
- 2005 Ironman Pro Invitational, 7th
- 2005 Mr. Olympia, 14th
- 2005 Mr. Olympia Wildcard Showdown, 1st
- 2005 San Francisco Pro Invitational, 7th
- 2005 Toronto Pro Invitational, 7th
- 2006 Arnold Classic, 11th
- 2006 Colorado Pro Championships, 3rd
- 2006 Ironman Pro Invitational, 2nd
- 2006 New York Pro Championships, 4th
- 2006 Mr. Olympia, 16th (tied)
- 2007 Arnold Classic, 14th
- 2007 Ironman Pro Invitational, 6th
- 2007 Mr. Olympia, 10th
- 2008 Ironman Pro Invitational, 12th
- 2008 Arnold Classic, 12th
- 2008 IFBB Tampa Bay Pro, 3rd
- 2008 Mr. Olympia, 15th
- 2008 Mr. Olympia 202 Division, 1st
- 2009 New York Pro 202 Division, 3rd
- 2009 Tampa Bay Pro 202 Division, 1st
- 2009 Mr. Olympia 202 Division, 2nd
- 2010 Europa Battle of Champions (Hartford, CT) 202 Division, 2nd
- 2012 DAPLACELLAS SUPER SHOW, 1st
- 2012 SHERU CLASSIC 212 1st
- 2013 SHERU CLASSIC 212 1st
- 2013 Mr. Olympia 212, 2nd
- 2014 Arnold Classic 212, 2nd
- 2016 Mr. Olympia 212, 5th
- 2017 Mr. Olympia 212, 4th
- 2017 Arnold Classic 212, 2nd
- 2018 Arnold Classic 212, 4th
- 2018 Muscle Contest Ireland 212, 1st
- 2018 Mr. Olympia 212, 6th
- 2018 Japan Pro 212, 1st
- 2019 Legion Sports Fest 212, 1st
- 2019 Mr. Olympia 212, 11th
- 2020 Mr. Olympia 212, 12th
- 2021 Legion Sports Fest 212 Masters, 1st
- 2022 Arnold Classic UK 212, 5th
- 2023 Masters Mr. Olympia 212, 2nd

== See also ==
- Arnold Classic
- List of male professional bodybuilders
- Mr. Olympia
