= Michael Kefalianos =

Greek bodybuilder

- Professional bodybuilder
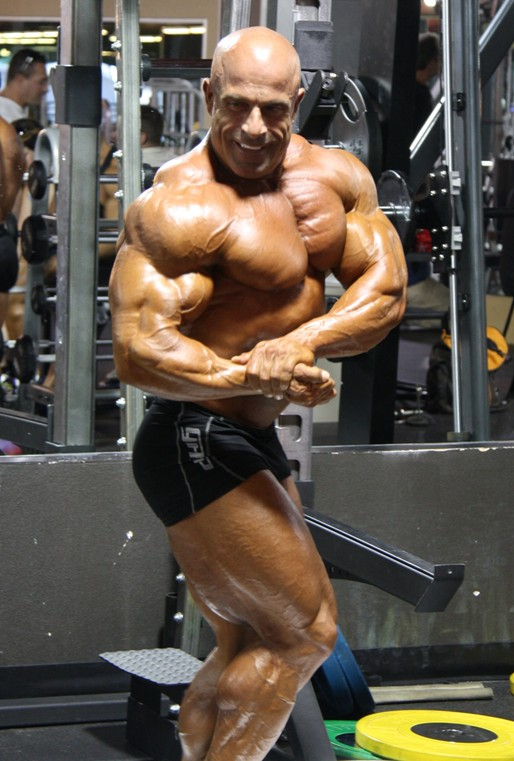

Personal info
- Nickname: The King of Conditioning; The Spartan; DynaMike
- Born: 16 August 1970 (age 55); Lagoudi, Kos, Greece

Best statistics
- Height: 1.68 m (5 ft 6 in)
- Weight: 110 kg (243 lb)

Professional (Pro) career
- Pro-debut: IFBB Australia Pro Grand Prix IX; 2009
- Best win: IFBB Mr. Europe Pro – 1st Place; 2012

Michael Kefalianos (Greek: Μιχάλης Κεφαλιανός), first name also spelt Michalis and Mihalis, is a Greek bodybuilder with Greek and Australian dual citizenship who is an International Federation of BodyBuilders (IFBB) professional bodybuilder. He is widely considered to be the best Greek bodybuilder. In 2009 at the IFBB Australian Pro Grand Prix he placed fourth and became the first Greek bodybuilder to ever qualify for the Mr. Olympia competition, which is held in Las Vegas once a year in September. He has since competed in more than 35 professional bodybuilding shows, with his career highlight the 2012 Mr. Europe win in Madrid, Spain.

== Life, training, and amateur career ==
Michael was born on the island of Kos in 1971. After completing compulsory service in the Greek Army, he began bodybuilding at the age of 20. He later lived in Adelaide, Australia, for four years with his wife, Helen, a Greek Australian and daughter of immigrants from Kos. The couple has four children. Following this period, he returned to Kos with his family. Between 1998 and 2007, Michael competed regularly in the Mr. Aegean and Mr. Hellas competitions, achieving multiple wins. He subsequently retired from competitive bodybuilding and established Olympian Gym Kos on the island, where he continues to reside.

== IFBB Pro bodybuilder ==
On 22 November 2008 he came first in the International North German Championship in Hamburg and earned his IFBB pro card by defeating other bodybuilders who had already earned their IFBB pro cards.

== Participation at Mr. Olympia ==
He qualified for Mr. Olympia on his IFBB pro debut at the 2009 IFBB Australia Grand Prix. He participated and ranked joint 16th in the IFBB Mr. Olympia contest in September 2009 for Australia. He participated in 2010 Mr. Olympia contest but was not placed. He qualified for 2011 Mr. Olympia at the 2011 IFBB Australia Grand Prix. The 2012 season started with Michael's invitation to his first Arnold Classic in Ohio, where he placed 9th. In March 2012 he placed 2nd to Branch Warren at the Australian Grand Prix and qualified for his 3rd Mr. Olympia. The highlight of his career came on 28 April 2012, in Madrid, Spain where Michael won his first professional bodybuilding competition, the 2012 Mr. Europe Pro.

== Competitive history ==
=== Amateur career ===
- 2008 International North German Championship in Hamburg – 1st
- 2009 NPC Arnold Classic Amateur Championships – 3rd (earned IFBB Pro card at this event)

=== Pro career ===
- 2009 IFBB Australia Pro Grand Prix IX – 4th (qualified for entry to Mr. Olympia)
- 2009 IFBB New York Pro – 11th
- 2009 IFBB Mr. Olympia – joint 16th
- 2010 IFBB Australia Pro Grand Prix X – 4th
- 2010 IFBB Orlando Europa Show of Champions – 4th
- 2010 IFBB Tampa Pro Bodybuilding Weekly Championships – 5th
- 2010 IFBB Hartford Europa Battle of Champions – 4th
- 2010 IFBB Dallas Europa Super Show – 5th
- 2010 IFBB Mr. Europe Pro – 6th
- 2011 IFBB Australia Pro Grand Prix XI – 3rd (qualified for entry to Mr. Olympia)
- 2011 IFBB British Grand Prix I Open Class – 5th
- 2011 IFBB FIBO Power Pro Germany – 5th
- 2011 IFBB New York Pro – 6th
- 2011 IFBB Mr. Olympia – 16th
- 2011 IFBB Sheru Classic – 7th
- 2011 IFBB Arnold Classic Europe – 8th
- 2012 IFBB Arnold Classic – 9th
- 2012 IFBB Australian Grand Prix – 2nd
- 2012 IFBB FIBO Power Pro – 2nd
- 2012 IFBB Mr. Europe Pro – Winner
- 2012 IFBB Mr. Olympia – 16th
- 2012 IFBB Sheru Classic – 5th
- 2012 IFBB Arnold Classic Europe – 8th
- 2012 IFBB EVLS Prague Pro – 9th
- 2012 IFBB Masters Olympia – 6th
- 2013 IFBB Arnold Classic – 12th
- 2013 IFBB Australian Grand Prix – 6th
- 2013 IFBB FIBO Power Pro – 7th
- 2013 IFBB Arnold Classic Brazil – 7th
- 2013 IFBB Mr. Europe Pro – 4th
- 2013 IFBB Arnold Classic Europe – 12th
- 2014 IFBB Arnold Classic Brazil - 8th
- 2014 IFBB New York Pro - 7th
- 2014 IFBB Arnold Classic Europe - 9th
- 2014 IFBB Fitness House Pro Russian Grand Prix - 9th
- 2015 IFBB Arnold Classic - 13th
- 2015 IFBB Arnold Classic Europe - 13th
- 2015 IFBB EVLS Prague Pro - 13th
- 2016 IFBB Levrone Pro Classic - 7th
- 2016 IFBB BodyPower Pro UK - 3rd
- 2016 IFBB New York Pro - 11th
- 2016 IFBB Arnold Classic Africa - 6th
- 2016 IFBB Arnold Classic Asia - 12th
- 2016 IFBB Arnold Classic Europe - 15th
- 2016 IFBB Olympia Europe - 8th
- 2018 IFBB New York Pro - 16th
- 2018 IFBB EVLS Prague Pro - 11th

== Sponsorship history ==
- Scitec Nutrition (inactive)
- Healthy2Day.gr (inactive)
- Bodybuilders.gr – The Largest Greek Bodybuilding & Fitness Site On The Web.
- MHP - Maximum Human Performance (inactive)

== See also ==
- List of male professional bodybuilders
- List of female professional bodybuilders
