= Silvio Samuel =

Nigerian-French bodybuilder (born 1975)

- Professional bodybuilder
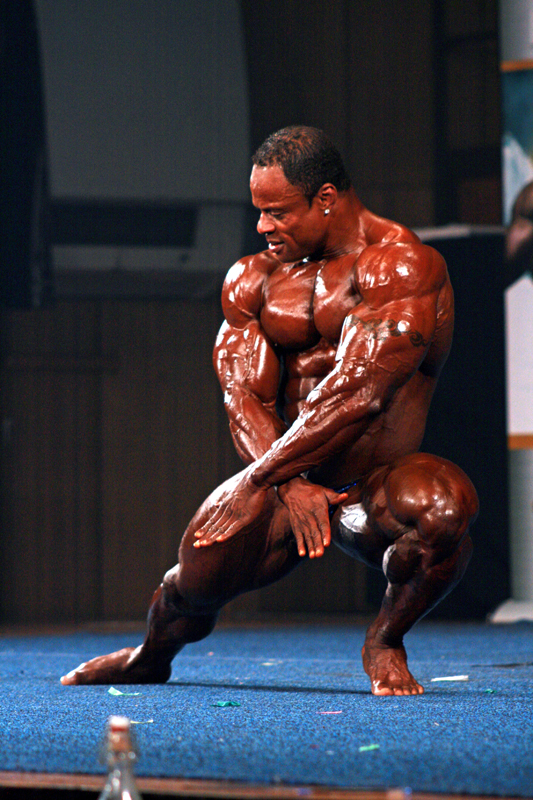
- 2009 IFBB Australian Pro Grand Prix IX

Personal info
- Born: August 3, 1975 (age 50); Nigeria

Best statistics
- Height: 5 ft 7 in (170 cm)
- Weight: 225 lb (102 kg; 16 st 1 lb)

Professional (Pro) career
- Active: Retired 2011

Silvio Samuel (born August 3, 1975 in Nigeria) is a Nigerian-French IFBB professional bodybuilder.

== Biography ==
Silvio Samuel is an IFBB professional bodybuilder, representing France. He was discovered by Coach Alfonso Gomez Plaza, as a young Olympic weightlifter with much potential.

Silvio originated from Nigeria, to a family of two boys and six sisters. He left Nigeria due to the political and nationwide instability which killed some of his family members. Growing up and traveling all over the world was a life-saving career for him and his family. He turned professional after winning the Joe Weider competition in France, that gave Silvio his professional card in 2006, which allowed him to pursue his dream career and becoming one of the top IFBB pro bodybuilders.

== Contest history ==
- World Championships 2002 - NAC, Medium, 1st
- World Championships 2002 - NAC, Overall Winner
- Universe 2003 - NAC, Medium, 1st
- Universe 2003 - NAC, Overall Winner
- World Championships - NAC, Medium, 1st
- World Championships - NAC, Overall Winner
- World Championships - WABBA, Short, 1st
    - PROFESSIONAL CAREER OF SILVIO SAMUEL THE LIST OF WINS AND PLACING.***
- New York Pro Show IFBB 2006 14th
- Europa Super Show IFBB 2006. 6th
- Ironman Pro IFBB 2007, 4th
- Sacramento Pro IFBB 2007. 2nd
- 1st 210 Class IFBB show Dallas, TX. 2007 1st*
- Europa Super Show IFBB, Dallas, TX.2007 1st*
- Arnold Classic, Pro IFBB 2007. 5th
- New York Pro Show IFBB 2007. 5th
- Mr Olympia 2007, 7th
- Houston Pro Show IFBB. 2008. 1st*
- Arnold Classic Pro IFBB 2008. 5th
- Mr. Olympia 2008, 7th
- Iron Man Pro Show, IFBB.2009, 1st*
- Arnold Classic, Pro IFBB.2009. 5th
- Mr. Olympia 2009, 12th (tie)

== See also ==
- List of male professional bodybuilders
- List of female professional bodybuilders
