= Darrem Charles =

Trinidad and Tobago bodybuilder

- Professional bodybuilder
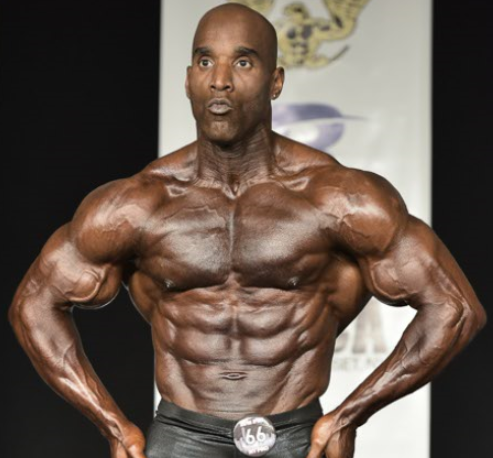
- Darrem competing - 2016 New York Pro Show -(Classic Physique)

Personal info
- Nickname: Trinidad Hercules
- Born: July 22, 1968 (age 58); Arouca, Trinidad

Best statistics
- Height: 175 cm (5 ft 9 in)
- Weight: 88 kg (194 lb)

Professional (Pro) career
- Pro-debut: WNBF - Natural Pro Show; 1986
- Best win: IFBB New York Pro Championship - 1st Place Overall; 2005
- Predecessor: None (2016)
- Successor: None (2016)
- Active: Since 1989

Darrem Charles (born July 22, 1968 in Arouca, Trinidad) is an actively competing IFBB professional bodybuilder.

== Biography ==
Darrem Charles was born in Arouca, Trinidad. Fourteen-time IFBB Pro Show Winner. Fourteen-time IFBB Olympia Show competitor. He first completed in several natural competitions in 1986 where he was a perennial champion. First in the WNBF (World Natural Bodybuilding Federation) and others. His first competition in the IFBB was in 1989 when he competed in the IFBB World Amateur Championships, where he placed 5th in the light heavyweight division. Charles first competed in the IFBB Night of Champions in 1992, where he placed 11th.

In 1995, Darrem Charles competed in an unprecedented 9 professional IFBB bodybuilding contests. Between 2002 and 2009 he won nine professional contests.

He currently resides in Fort Lauderdale, FL. He works out at the BusyBody Fitness Center on Glades Rd. Charles appeared in volume 5 of DVD series 'Titans' and promises many more DVDs, the first one entitled 'The Art of Posing'. In October 2005 he produced the DVD, Darrem Charles - From Dream to Reality - Titans 5 (DVD) - The Life of IFBB Superstar Darrem Charles (6-time Pro winner) in the gym, on stage, at home, in his hotel room. It was taped 2 weeks out from Mr. Olympia. Running time: 125 min, All-Region, NTSC. A Muscletime Production.

In 2016, Charles returned to competition after a brief two-year hiatus. He is currently competing in the IFBB's new Classic Bodybuilding Division. As he neared 50, he won nine Classic Physique pro titles, matching his nine open wins years earlier.

== Competitive stats ==
- Height: 5 ft 9 in (1.75 m)
- Contest Weight: 195 pounds (88 kg)
- Arms: 22 inches (56 cm) in 2007

== Filmography ==
- Darrem Charles: The Art of Posing (2002)
- Darrem Charles: The Life of IFBB Superstar Darrem Charles 6-time Pro winner (2005)

== Contest history ==
- 1986 WNBF (World Natural Bodybuilding Federation) - Natural Pro Show
- 1989 Trinidad Invitational Natural, Light-Heavyweight, 1st and Overall Winner
- 1989 World Amateur Championships, Light-Heavyweight, 5th
- 1990 World Amateur Championships, Light-Heavyweight, 2nd
- 1992 World Amateur Championships, Light-Heavyweight, 1st Overall Winner
- 1992 Chicago Pro Invitational, 12th
- 1992 Night of Champions, 11th
- 1995 Arnold Classic, 8th
- 1995 Florida Pro Invitational, 3rd
- 1995 Houston Pro Invitational, 7th
- 1995 Ironman Pro Invitational, 5th
- 1995 Niagara Falls Pro Invitational, 5th
- 1995 Night of Champions, 9th
- 1995 Mr. Olympia, 15th
- 1995 San Jose Pro Invitational, 5th
- 1995 South Beach Pro Invitational, 3rd
- 1996 Arnold Classic, 10th
- 1996 Florida Pro Invitational, 9th
- 1996 Ironman Pro Invitational, 5th
- 1998 Arnold Classic, 6th
- 1998 Ironman Pro Invitational, 2nd
- 1998 Night of Champions, 7th
- 1998 Mr. Olympia, Did not place
- 1998 San Francisco Pro Invitational, 3rd
- 1999 Arnold Classic, 8th
- 1999 Ironman Pro Invitational, 4th
- 1999 Night of Champions, 8th
- 2000 Arnold Classic, 7th
- 2000 Ironman Pro Invitational, 5th
- 2001 Arnold Classic, 8th
- 2001 Mr. Olympia, 18th
- 2001 Toronto Pro Invitational, 3rd
- 2002 Night of Champions, 4th
- 2002 Mr. Olympia, 16th
- 2002 Southwest Pro Cup, 1st
- 2002 Toronto Pro Invitational, 4th
- 2003 Arnold Classic, 6th
- 2003 Ironman Pro Invitational, 5th
- 2003 Maximum Pro Invitational, 1st
- 2003 Mr. Olympia, 7th
- 2003 Show of Strength Pro Championship, 6th
- 2004 Florida Pro Xtreme Challenge, 1st
- 2004 Hungarian Pro Invitational, 2nd
- 2004 Night of Champions, 2nd
- 2004 Mr. Olympia, 10th
- 2004 Show of Strength Pro Championship, 2nd
- 2004 Toronto Pro Invitational, 1st
- 2005 Arnold Classic, 6th
- 2005 New York Pro Championship, 1st
- 2005 Mr. Olympia, 9th
- 2005 Toronto Pro Invitational, 1st
- 2006 Arnold Classic, 8th
- 2006 Colorado Pro Championship, 2nd
- 2006 New York Pro, 2nd
- 2006 Europa Super Show, 4th
- 2006 Montreal Pro, 2nd
- 2006 Atlantic City Pro, 1st
- 2006 Mr. Olympia, 14th
- 2007 Atlantic City Pro, 2nd
- 2007 Colorado Pro Championships, 2nd
- 2007 Keystone Pro Classic, 6th
- 2007 Montreal Pro Championships, Winner
- 2007 Mr. Olympia, 12th
- 2008 IFBB Tampa Bay Pro, 4th
- 2008 Atlantic City Pro, 3rd
- 2008 Atlantic City Pro (Masters Division), 1st
- 2008 Mr. Olympia, 11th
- 2009 Europa Show Of Champions, 3rd
- 2009 New York Pro, 7th
- 2009 Sacramento Pro, (8th)
- 2009 Mr. Olympia, (16th)
- 2010 Pro Bodybuilding Weekly Championships, Men Open Class (10th)
- 2010 Europa Battle of Champions, Men Open (9th)
- 2010 Europa Battle of Champions, Men: Best Poser
- 2010 NPC Dexter Jackson Classic, Men's Bodybuilding : Guest Poser
- 2011 IFBB Pro World Masters Championships/Pro Bikini, Bodybuilding: Masters Men (6th)
- 2012 Masters Mr. Olympia/Miami Pro, Masters Bodybuilding : IFBB Masters Men (7th)
- 2013 Arnold Classic Pro Bodybuilding (9th)
- 2016 Pittsburgh Pro, IFBB Pro Classic Physique (2nd)
- 2016 New York Pro, IFBB Men's Classic Physique (2nd)
- 2016 Miami Muscle Beach, IFBB Men's Classic Physique (1st)
- 2016 Puerto Rico Pro, IFBB Pro Classic Men Physique (1st)
- 2016 Toronto Pro, IFBB Pro Classic Men Physique (1st)
- 2016 Wings of Strength Chicago Pro, IFBB Pro Classic Men Physique (1st)
- 2016 IFBB Wings of Strength Tampa Pro (2nd)
- 2016 IFBB Olympia - Men's Physique Classic (5th)
- 2017 IFBB Karina Nascimento Pro (1st)
- 2017 IFBB Olympia - Men's Physique Classic (13th)

== See also ==
- List of male professional bodybuilders
