= Bill Wilmore =

American IFBB professional bodybuilder

Bill Wilmore is an American IFBB professional bodybuilder.

== About ==
Wilmore was born in 1971 in Pennsylvania. This professional bodybuilder stands at 5 feet 10 inches (1.78 m) tall. He weighs 300 pounds (140 kg) during his off season but his competition weight is 250 pounds (110 kg). Wilmore is married.

== Career ==
On top of competing professionally, Wilmore is also a personal trainer.

== Contest history ==
- 1989 NPC Pennsylvania Championships, Teen, 2nd
- 1995 NPC Junior Nationals, Heavyweight, 2nd
- 1995 NPC USA Championships, Heavyweight, 11th
- 1996 NPC Nationals, HeavyWeight, 13th
- 1999 NPC Nationals, Super-Heavyweight, 8th
- 2000 NPC USA Championships, Super-Heavyweight, 3rd
- 2001 NPC USA Championships, Super-Heavyweight, 6th
- 2002 NPC Nationals, Super-Heavyweight, 10th
- 2003 NPC Nationals, Super-Heavyweight, 2nd
- 2004 NPC Nationals, Super-Heavyweight, 2nd
- 2005 NPC Nationals, Super-Heavyweight, 1st and Overall
- 2006 Colorado Pro Championships, 5th
- 2006 New York Pro Championships, 5th
- 2006 Mr. Olympia, 16th (tied)

== See also ==
- List of male professional bodybuilders
- List of female professional bodybuilders
