= Hidetada Yamagishi =

Japanese IFBB professional bodybuilder (born 1973)

- 山岸 秀匡
- Born: 30 June 1973 (age 53); Obihiro, Hokkaido, Japan
- Other names: The Dragon; The Ultimate Warrior
- Height: 1.68 m (5 ft 6 in)

Hidetada "Hide" Yamagishi (山岸 秀匡, Yamagishi Hidetada) (born 30 June 1973) is a Japanese IFBB professional bodybuilder. In 2007 he became the first Japanese bodybuilder to compete in the Mr. Olympia contest and was the first Japanese bodybuilder to have been invited to compete at the Arnold Classic.

== Early life ==
Hidetada Yamagishi was born and raised in Obihiro, Hokkaido. During his youth, he played rugby and started lifting weights while at Hokkaido Sapporo Asahigaoka High School. He then proceeded to Waseda University, where he pursued weightlifting more seriously.

== Career ==
Yamagishi has appeared in a number of magazines, including Weekly Playboy, Tarzan, and Ironman Japan, and has released a number of few training videos/DVDs, the latest being called 闘: A Warrior's Fight. He has also appeared on television in Japan.

In January 2008, Yamagishi was charged in California with possession (and supposed distribution) of steroids; he served a 65-day sentence in an American prison before being released and having all felony charges dismissed.

Yamagishi's "philosophy on training" is "an 'all or nothing' mentality. There is no such thing as 'impossible'. Train hard everyday, and even harder the next day!"

He lives both in the US and Japan. He holds a degree in Sports Nutrition Science and National Certification in Japan from the NSCA-Japan and National Certification in Japan for Acupuncture Therapy.

== IFBB professional history ==
=== 2005 ===
- IFBB Ironman Pro Invitational - 17th

=== 2006 ===
- IFBB Grand Prix Austria - 12th
- IFBB Grand Prix Holland - 4th
- IFBB Grand Prix Romania - 6th
- IFBB Ironman Pro Invitational - Unplaced
- IFBB San Francisco Pro Invitational - 11th
- IFBB Santa Susanna Pro - 12th

=== 2007 ===
- IFBB Ironman Pro Invitational - 7th
- IFBB Arnold Classic - 13th
- IFBB Atlantic City Pro - 9th
- IFBB Mr. Olympia - 13th
- IFBB Grand Prix Australia - 5th
- IFBB Sacramento Pro Championships - 3rd

=== 2008 ===
- IFBB Atlantic City Pro - 9th

=== 2009 ===
- IFBB Ironman Pro Invitational - 4th
- IFBB New York Pro -5th
- IFBB Europa Show of Champions - 2nd
- IFBB Mr. Olympia - 9th

=== 2010 ===
- IFBB Mr. Olympia - 10th
- IFBB Arnold Classic - 8th
- IFBB New York Pro - 2nd
- IFBB Europa Show of Champions - 1st
- IFBB Orlando Show of Champions - 10th
- IFBB Phoenix Pro - 2nd

=== 2011 ===
- IFBB Phoenix Pro - 2nd
- IFBB Pro Bodybuilding Weekly Championships (a.k.a. Tampa Pro) - 2nd
- IFBB Mr. Olympia - 10th

=== 2012 ===
- NPC Lansing Grand Prix - NP
- IFBB PBW Tampa Pro - 3rd
- IFBB Dallas Europa Supershow - 2nd
- IFBB Mr. Olympia - 15th
- IFBB Arnold Classic Europe - 12th
- IFBB British Grand Prix - 8th

=== 2013 ===
- IFBB Arnold Classic - 5th

=== 2014 ===
- IFBB Arnold Classic 212 category - 4th
- IFBB Mr. Olympia 212 category - 4th
- IFBB Tampa Pro 212 category - 1st

=== 2015 ===
- IFBB Arnold Classic 212 category - 2nd
- IFBB Mr. Olympia 212 category - 3rd

=== 2016 ===
- IFBB Arnold Classic 212 category - 1st
- IFBB Mr. Olympia 212 category - 6th
- IFBB Asia Grand Prix 212 category - 3rd

=== 2017 ===
- IFBB Arnold Classic 212 category - 6th

=== 2018 ===
- IFBB Arnold Classic - 10th
- IFBB Arnold Classic Australia - 5th
- IFBB Indy Pro - 7th

=== 2019 ===
- IFBB Europa Dallas - 1st
- IFBB Mr. Olympia 212 category - 8th

=== 2020 ===
- IFBB Mr. Olympia 212 category - 14th

=== 2023 ===
- IFBB Masters Olympia 212 category - 1st
