= Johnnie O. Jackson =

American bodybuilder and powerlifter

- Professional bodybuilder

Personal info
- Born: January 30, 1971 (age 55); Hammonton, New Jersey, U.S.

Best statistics

Professional (Pro) career
- Pro-debut: NPC Texas State Championships; 1998
- Best win: 2006 IFBB Montreal Pro Champion; 2006

Johnnie Otis Jackson (born January 30, 1971, in Hammonton, New Jersey) is an American IFBB professional bodybuilder and powerlifter. Jackson has been said to have one of the best developed upper bodies in professional bodybuilding in the world. He is known for training in Arlington, Texas, with fellow American IFBB pro competitor Branch Warren. Due to his strength, he has sometimes been referred to (especially in 2009) as the world's strongest bodybuilder.

== Biography ==
Jackson first competed in an NPC (National Physique Committee) in 2001, where he won the NPC USA. His first IFBB competition was the GNC Show of Strength (now defunct) of 2002, where he placed 10th. His first IFBB Night of Champions was in 2003, where he placed 5th. Later that same year he competed in the Ironman Pro Invitational, where he placed 9th.

In 2003, he competed in his first Mr. Olympia, where he placed 11th. His first Arnold Classic was in 2006, where he placed 13th. Jackson regularly competes in powerlifting events and often incorporates this type of training into his workouts. Jackson lives in Fort Worth, Texas, and trains at Metroflex Gym in Arlington, Texas, with training partner Branch Warren. Both have trained with Janae Kroc. Jackson is one of the few professional bodybuilders who has consistently competed in the "Mr. Olympia" competition for over 13 years, only sitting out in 2009 when he competed in the "Mr. Olympia 2009 World's Strongest Professional Bodybuilder".

Johnnie Jackson competed in the 2008 United States Powerlifting Federation (USPF) National Powerlifting Championships in Warwick, Rhode Island on June 29, 2009. He opened the bench press competition with an easy first attempt of 465 lbs (232 kg) unaided by a bench shirt. His next two lifts were disqualified although he was able to handle the heavy weight, including a close miss at 600 lb with bench press shirt. Jackson set a USPF World Record on his first attempt at deadlift with a pull of 345 kg (760 lbs) in a deadlift suit, which was followed by two close misses of 372.5 kg (821 lbs), whereby he pulled his left hamstring during the third and last attempt.

In 2009, Jackson earned the title "Mr. Olympia 2009 World's Strongest Professional Bodybuilder" by benching 523 lbs (237 kg) in an old polyester blast bench shirt and deadlifting 815 lbs (370 kg) in a champions deadlift suit for a 1,338 lb push/pull total defeating Ben White, who bench pressed 573 lbs and deadlifted 633 lbs for a 1,206 lb total in the same equipment. This record was surpassed a year later by Stan Efferding in the Mr. Olympia 2010 World's Strongest Professional Bodybuilder contest with a 1,428 lb total (628 lb + 800 lb).

Jackson competed in the Raw Unity Deadlift Competition on January 22, 2012. He deadlifted 771 lbs raw on his first attempt, missed his second at 832 lbs, but easily pulled the 832 lbs raw on the third attempt for his all-time personal best at age 40 as a master class lifter.

== Stats ==
- Full Name: Johnnie Otis Jackson
- Place of Birth: Hammonton, New Jersey
- Date of Birth: January 30, 1971
- Current Residence: Hurst, Texas
- Occupation: IFBB professional bodybuilder, personal trainer

Physique stats

- Height: 5'6"
- Contest Weight: 255 lb
- Off-Season Weight: 275 lb
- Eye Color: Brown
- Hair Color: Black
- Chest 57"
- Arms: 23"
- Waist: 32"

Gym stat

- Squat (1 rep max.): 825 lb with squat suit, unofficial gym max
- Bench Press (1 rep max.): 600 lb with bench shirt, unofficial gym max
- Deadlift (1 rep max.): 832 lb raw, official deadlift-only meet result
- Barbell Curl (8 rep max.): 225 lb

== Contest history ==
- 1998 NPC Texas State Championships, Middleweight, 2nd
- 1999 NPC Junior Nationals, Light-Heavyweight, 1st
- 1999 NPC Nationals, Light-Heavyweight, 11th
- 2000 NPC USA Championships, Light-Heavyweight, 2nd
- 2001 NPC Nationals, Light-Heavyweight, 1st and Overall
- 2001 NPC USA Championships, Light-Heavyweight, 1st
- 2002 Show of Strength Pro Championship, 10th
- 2003 Grand Prix England, 5th
- 2003 Grand Prix Holland, 5th
- 2003 Ironman Pro Invitational, 9th
- 2003 Night of Champions, 5th
- 2003 Mr. Olympia, 11th
- 2003 San Francisco Pro Invitational, 9th
- 2003 Show of Strength Pro Championship, 10th
- 2004 Grand Prix Australia, 8th
- 2004 Hungarian Pro Invitational, 5th
- 2004 Ironman Pro Invitational, 7th
- 2004 Mr. Olympia, 14th
- 2004 San Francisco Pro Invitational, 9th
- 2004 Show of Strength Pro Championship, 7th
- 2004 Toronto Pro Invitational, 2nd
- 2005 Europa Supershow, 2nd
- 2005 Mr. Olympia, 11th
- 2005 Toronto Pro Invitational, 2nd
- 2006 Arnold Classic, 13th
- 2006 San Francisco Pro Invitational, 7th
- 2006 Europa Super Show, 3rd
- 2006 Montreal Pro, 1st
- 2006 Atlantic City Pro, 2nd
- 2006 Mr. Olympia, 13th
- 2007 Atlantic City Pro, 1st
- 2007 Mr. Olympia, 9th
- 2008 Ironman Pro Invitational, 5th
- 2008 Arnold Classic, 9th
- 2008 Mr. Olympia, 12th
- 2009 Ironman Pro, 10th
- 2009 Tampa Pro, 8th
- 2009 Europa Pro, 12th
- 2010 Phoenix Pro, 12th
- 2010 Arnold Classic, 12th
- 2010 New York Pro, 8th
- 2010 Tampa Pro, 3rd
- 2010 Europa Pro, 6th
- 2010 Mr. Olympia, 11th
- 2011 Arnold Classic, 7th
- 2011 Mr. Olympia, 13th
- 2012 FIBO Power Pro Germany, 1st
- 2012 Mr. Olympia, 9th
- 2012 EVLS Prague Pro 1, 3rd
- 2013 Arnold Classic, 4th
- 2013 Mr. Olympia, 16th
- 2014 Mr. Olympia, 11th
- 2015 Mr. Olympia, 15th
- 2017 Arnold Classic South Africa, 1st
- 2017 Toronto Pro, 1st

== See also ==
- List of male professional bodybuilders
