= Ronny Rockel =

German bodybuilder (born 1972)

- Professional bodybuilder

Personal info
- Nickname: The Rock
- Born: 12 July 1972 (age 54); Schlema, East Germany

Best statistics
- Height: 5 ft 6 in (168 cm)
- Weight: 230–235 lb (104–107 kg) in season 240–250 lb (109–113 kg) off-season

Professional (Pro) career
- Pro-debut: IFBB Grand Prix Holland; 1991
- Best win: 2006 Grand Prix Australia Champion; 2006
- Predecessor: Lee Priest
- Successor: Dexter Jackson
- Active: 1996-2018

Ronny Rockel (born 12 July 1972) is a former IFBB professional bodybuilder from East Germany.

== Biography ==
Ronny Rockel was born and raised in East Germany. Like many other professional bodybuilders from Europe such as Milos Sarcev and Pavol Jablonicky, Rockel grew up under communist rule. Because of this Rockel was not aware of bodybuilding and other things of the outside world.

This soon changed in 1989 when the Berlin Wall was taken down. At seventeen years of age and 143 pounds, he decided that he wanted a body like Arnold Schwarzenegger's after seeing the film Conan the Barbarian, but at the time commercial gyms in his hometown of Karl-Marx-Stadt (now Chemnitz), East Germany, were non existent. Instead of abandoning his interest in bodybuilding, he created his own weight set.

Following the demise of communism, entrepreneurial activities in the East of Germany spawned and with that the first gym opened in Ronny's hometown. He soon joined and began absorbing information about diet and weight training from other members and fitness magazines.

At his first competition, the Hessian Championships, he placed last in his class. But he did not become discouraged, he came back a year later and won the 1995 NABBA German Nationals and placed third at the NABBA Mr. Universe. From then Rockel decided that he had the potential to become a professional bodybuilder.

== Contest history ==
- 1994 NABBA Hessian Championships, Did not place
- 1995 NABBA German Nationals Championships, 1st
- 1996 NABBA World Championships, Medium, 3rd
- 1998 NABBA Mr Universe, Medium, 2nd
- 1999 NABBA Mr Universe, Medium, 2nd
- 2000 NABBA Mr Universe, Medium, 2nd
- 2000 WABBA World Championships, Short, 1st
- 2002 WABBA International German Championships, 1st (HW and overall) (Pro Card)
- 2003 IFBB Grand Prix Holland, 7th
- 2003 IFBB Grand Prix Hungary, 4th
- 2003 IFBB Maximum Pro Invitational Grand Prix, 6th
- 2003 IFBB Night of Champions, 15th
- 2004 IFBB Grand Prix Australia, 7th
- 2004 IFBB Grand Prix England, 7th
- 2004 IFBB Grand Prix Holland, 7th
- 2004 IFBB Hungarian Pro Invitational, 6th
- 2004 IFBB Ironman Pro Invitational, 10th
- 2004 IFBB Night of Champions, 14th
- 2005 IFBB Grand Prix Australia, 3rd
- 2005 IFBB Mr. Olympia, 17th
- 2006 IFBB Grand Prix Australia, 1st
- 2006 IFBB Mr. Olympia, 16th (tied)
- 2006 IFBB Grand Prix Austria, 5th
- 2006 IFBB Grand Prix Holland, 3rd
- 2007 IFBB Arnold Classic, 8th
- 2007 IFBB Grand Prix Australia, 2nd
- 2007 IFBB Colorado Pro, 4th
- 2007 IFBB Santa Susanna Pro, 3rd
- 2007 IFBB Mr. Olympia, 11th
- 2008 IFBB Arnold Classic, 13th
- 2008 IFBB Grand Prix Australia, 6th
- 2008 IFBB Grand Prix New Zealand, 6th
- 2008 IFBB New York Pro Championships, 3rd
- 2008 IFBB Mr.Olympia 14th
- 2009 IFBB Mr.Olympia 7th
- 2010 IFBB Arnold Classic, 6th
- 2010 IFBB Mr Europe, 1st
- 2010 IFBB Mr.Olympia, 6th
- 2011 IFBB Arnold Classic, 6th
- 2011 IFBB Mr. Europe Gran Prix, 1st
- 2011 IFBB New York Pro Championships, 2nd
- 2013 IFBB Arnold Classic, 13th
- 2014 IFBB Ferrigno Legacy, 1st
- 2015 IFBB Mr. Olympia, 14th
- 2015 IFBB Ferrigno Legacy, 2nd
- 2016 IFBB Mozolani Pro (Men's 212), 2nd
- 2016 IFBB Mr. Olympia (Men's 212), 9th
- 2017 IFBB New York Pro Championships (Men's 212), 1st
- 2017 IFBB Toronto Pro Supershow (Men's 212), 1st
- 2017 IFBB Mr. Olympia (Men's 212), 7th
- 2017 IFBB EVL´S Prague Pro (Men's 212), 3rd
- 2017 IFBB Kuwait Pro (Men's 212), 7th
- 2018 NAC Frey Classic Pro Am, 2nd
