= Kai Greene =

American personal trainer and bodybuilder

- Professional bodybuilder
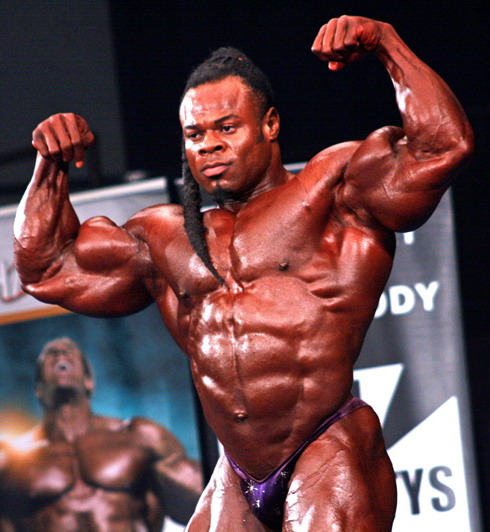
- Greene posing in March 2009

Personal info
- Nickname: Mr. Getting It Done; The Predator; The People’s Champ
- Born: July 12, 1975 (age 51); New York City, U.S.

Best statistics
- Height: 5 ft 7 22/32 in (1.72 m)
- Weight: Contest: 267 lb (121 kg); Off season: 300 lb (140 kg)

Professional (Pro) career
- Pro-debut: IFBB New York Pro; 2005
- Best win: Arnold Classic; 2009–2010, 2016

Leslie Kai Greene (born July 12, 1975) is an American professional bodybuilder, actor, and artist. Nicknamed "The Predator" and "The People's Champ", he is known for his leg development and artistic posing routines. He came second in the 2012, 2013, and 2014 editions of the IFBB's Mr. Olympia competition and won the Arnold Classic competition in 2009, 2010, and 2016. He was known for his rivalry with Phil Heath. He is often regarded as one of the best bodybuilders to have never won a Mr. Olympia. He has not competed since 2016, though he never formally announced his retirement.

== Early life ==
Leslie Kai Greene was born in New York City's Brooklyn borough on July 12, 1975. From the age of six, he was raised in foster care and residential treatment centers in Brooklyn. His online biography states that his rapid physical growth and development drew the attention of his seventh grade English teacher, and since his behavior in school was troublesome, he was inspired to enter teenage bodybuilding competitions as an outlet. He contradicted this claim in the documentary Kai (2022), in which he said that he started bodybuilding during his teenage years to appear less like a potential victim to other residents at the treatment center and that his interest was bolstered by an employee at the center giving him a copy of Arnold Schwarzenegger's book The New Encyclopedia of Modern Bodybuilding, which he also used to learn how to read.

== Bodybuilding career ==
=== National Physique Committee and New York Pro ===
Greene began bodybuilding full-time while working at the Johnny Lats Gym in New York, where he started training under Jakob Panotas in 1996. He competed in the National Physique Committee (NPC) and aimed to move into the IFBB; he later perceived his success in the NPC as mixed, primarily because he won the 1999 NPC Team Universe competition but then took a five-year hiatus before re-emerging to win the 2004 NPC Team Universe, which qualified him for the IFBB. In 2011, he began working with preparation coach George Farah and won that year's New York Pro Championship.

=== Mr. Olympia ===
Greene's third place finish at the 2011 Mr. Olympia qualified him for the 2012 competition. He would go on to place second at Mr. Olympia in 2012, 2013, and 2014, behind Phil Heath each time. Their rivalry was popular and the 2014 Mr. Olympia became notable for the two antagonizing each other onstage, culminating in a heated exchange during the prejudging phase.

Greene did not compete in the 2015 Mr. Olympia for undisclosed reasons, though he issued a statement to say that "there is a lot more going on behind the scenes that [he] cannot discuss". He also posted a YouTube video, which is now private, in which he discussed how the experience made him feel like his career was being forced to end against his will before breaking down in tears. Olympia officials allegedly denied any claims that he was banned from competing, but confirmed that he did not register despite being reminded to do so several times since May of that year. Greene requested an extension on the registration period and was given an extra two months, but did not meet this deadline either.

Greene won the 2016 Arnold Classic, which he had also won in 2009 and 2010, but has not competed in bodybuilding since. He declined a special offer to compete in the 2017 Mr. Olympia without having to re-qualify.

In the documentary Kai (2022), Greene stated that he was not allowed to sign up for the 2015 Mr. Olympia because he had started his supplement company Dynamik Muscle while still under contract with Weider Publications, which also operates Mr. Olympia. The company then sued him for breach of contract and withheld his contract, which was reported to be worth six figures, while still using his name and likeness to promote the competition.

=== Documentaries ===
Greene starred in the documentary Overkill (2010), which documented his preparation for his first appearance at the 2009 Mr. Olympia. The sequel Redemption (2010) showcased his training and philosophies for the 2010 Arnold Classic, which he won for the second year in a row. He starred in the documentary Generation Iron (2013), which detailed the lead-up to and events of the 2012 Mr. Olympia competition. He was also featured in the sequels Generation Iron 2 (2017) and Generation Iron 3 (2018), as well as Kai (2022), his own documentary by the same team chronicling his life story.

=== Technique ===
Greene has often discussed the "mind-muscle connection". In an article published by Flex, he explained, "The mind-muscle connection is the number one factor in training. You develop it over time by posing your muscle, and also by paying close attention to how your muscles feel when you work them. Eventually, you get to where your mind can read the feedback your muscles are providing, and your muscles can react to the stimulus your mind is providing. Practice posing between sets or anytime. And feel your muscles working throughout your sets. Eventually, your mind and muscles will speak the same language and communicate back and forth."

=== Sponsors and endorsements ===
Greene was sponsored by Flex. He launched a supplement brand called Dynamik Muscle in 2015, and a training program called The 5P in May 2016. The latter is named after the acronym for his motto, "Proper Preparation Prevents Poor Performance". He is sponsored by sportswear company Ryderwear, who have released lines of signature clothing and footwear in his name, and he signed a deal with sports supplement and clothing company REDCON1 in 2020.

== Other work ==
=== Fashion ===
Greene's choice of apparel has influenced trends and preferences within the fitness and lifestyle sectors. He is known for popularising the hoodie during workout sessions, with the hoodie becoming a representation of Greene's brand and philosophy. A striking element of his wardrobe is the Kai Greene RWXKG Fleece Hoodie, particularly in its bold red color.

=== Acting ===
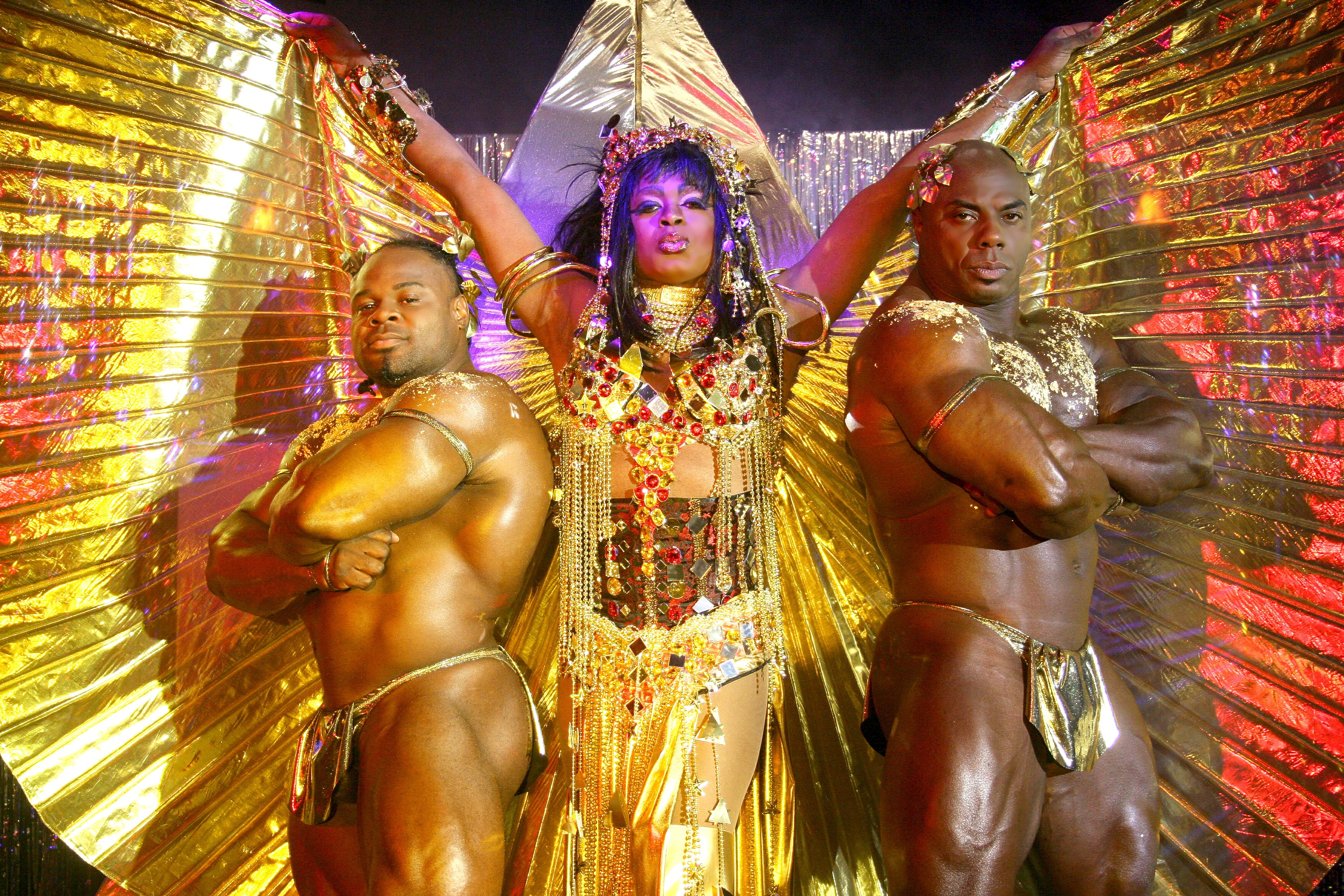
Greene (left) with Aaron Warr (middle) and Toney Freeman (right) in College Debts (2015)

Greene portrayed a male stripper in the comedy film College Debts (2015) and a villain who fights the protagonist during the opening sequence of the martial arts film Crazy Fist (2018). In January 2017, it was announced that he had signed with The Gersh Agency. He played Funshine in the second season of the Netflix sci-fi series Stranger Things (2017) and appeared in the Indian action-thriller film Pogaru (2021).

=== Art ===
Greene is an avid artist who often creates self-portraits to help himself build and maintain his ideal physique. In August 2011, he exhibited some of his work to the public; at the exhibition, he stated, "As a professional bodybuilder, I'm a master sculptor. The art show made me realize that I've always been an artist: my medium the human physique. My life is what I make it, just like the art I've produced on canvas and on stage. This art show makes this statement. I'm celebrating some personal accomplishments and my own artistic expression."

=== Podcasting ===
In November 2015, Greene and fitness model Krystal Lavenne began co-hosting the weekly Generation Iron podcast, in which they discussed various topics while answering questions sent in by fans. Greene left the podcast at an unknown point in time.

In October 2020, Greene began hosting his own podcast called Getting It Done.

=== Other ===
In 2021, Greene became the face of a gaming cryptocurrency called Grapefruit Supercoin.

== Controversies ==
Before his bodybuilding career took off, Greene was often financially destitute and resorted to working as a stripper at some of New York's gay nightclubs; after one particularly bad night in which he made no money and was worried about not being able to eat, he accepted a lucrative offer from a man who hired him to appear in a video that featured him fornicating with a grapefruit. The video, which later leaked online, has often been rumored to be a behind-the-scenes reason Greene has never won the Mr. Olympia competition. Greene addressed the video in the documentary Kai (2022), which also featured bodybuilders such as Phil Heath and Víctor Martínez defending Greene's decision to make the video and denouncing the criticism he received online.

== Contest history ==
- 1994 NGA American Nationals
- 1996 WNBF Pro Natural Worlds – 1st
- 1997 NPC Team Universe Championships – 2nd
- 1998 NPC Team Universe Championships – 3rd
- 1999 World Amateur Championships – 6th
- 1999 NPC Team Universe Championships – 1st
- 2005 New York Pro – 14th
- 2006 Superman Pro – 20th
- 2006 Shawn Ray Colorado Pro/Am Classic – 14th
- 2007 New York Pro – 6th
- 2007 Keystone Pro Classic – 3rd
- 2007 Shawn Ray Colorado Pro/Am Classic – 1st
- 2008 New York Pro – 1st
- 2008 Arnold Classic – 3rd
- 2009 Australian Pro Grand Prix – 1st
- 2009 Arnold Classic – 1st
- 2009 Mr. Olympia – 4th
- 2010 Arnold Classic – 1st
- 2010 Australian Pro Grand Prix – 1st
- 2010 Mr. Olympia – 7th
- 2011 New York Pro – 1st
- 2011 Mr. Olympia – 3rd
- 2011 Sheru Classic – 3rd
- 2012 Mr. Olympia – 2nd
- 2012 Sheru Classic – 2nd
- 2013 Mr. Olympia – 2nd
- 2013 Arnold Classic Europe – 2nd
- 2013 EVL's Prague Pro – 1st
- 2014 Mr. Olympia – 2nd
- 2016 Arnold Classic – 1st
- 2016 Arnold Classic Australia – 1st
- 2016 Arnold Classic Brazil – 1st
