= 2016 Mr. Olympia =

Bodybuilding competition

- Genre: Professional bodybuilding competition
- Country: United States
- Previous event: 2015 Mr. Olympia
- Next event: 2017 Mr. Olympia
- Organizer: IFBB
- People: Winner: Phil Heath

The 2016 Mr. Olympia contest was an IFBB professional bodybuilding competition that was held on September 16–17, 2016, in Las Vegas, Nevada. It was the 52nd Mr. Olympia competition. Other events at the exhibition included the 212 Olympia Showdown, Fitness Olympia, Figure Olympia, Bikini Olympia, Women's Physique Showdown, Classic Physique Olympia, and Men's Physique Showdown contests.

== Results ==
Phil Heath won his sixth consecutive Mr. Olympia title and tied Dorian Yates's total of six wins.

Place	Name	No.	Country	Judging	Finals	Total	Prize
1	Phil Heath	19	(United States)	5	5	10	$400,000
2	Shawn Rhoden	16	(Jamaica)	12	13	25	$150,000
3	Dexter Jackson	17	(United States)	13	17	30	$100,000
4	Mamdouh Elssbiay	14	(Egypt)	26	20	46	$55,000
5	William Bonac	15	(Netherlands)	24	25	49	$45,000
6	Roelly Winklaar	9	(Curaçao)	29	30	59	$35,000
7	Cedric McMillan	6	(United States)	32	37	69	$25,000
8	Dallas McCarver	4	(United States)	41	42	83	$20,000
9	Josh Lenartowicz	7	(Australia)	44	45	89	$19,000
10	Justin Compton	12	(United States)	51	49	100	$16,000

== Other divisions ==
Flex Lewis won the 212 Olympia for the fifth consecutive year. Danny Hester won the first Classic Physique contest held at the Olympia, and Jeremy Buendia won Men's Physique for the third year in a row. In the women's divisions, Latorya Watts retained the Figure Olympia title, Juliana Malacarne retained the Women's Physique title, Oksana Grishina won Fitness and Courtney King won Bikini.
