= 2015 Mr. Olympia =

Professional bodybuilding competition

- Genre: Professional bodybuilding competition
- Country: United States
- Previous event: 2014 Mr. Olympia
- Next event: 2016 Mr. Olympia
- Organizer: IFBB
- People: Winner: Phil Heath

The 2015 Mr. Olympia contest was an IFBB professional bodybuilding competition that was held on September 18-19, 2015, in Las Vegas, Nevada. It was the 51st Mr. Olympia competition celebrated. Other events at the exhibition included the 212 Olympia Showdown, Ms. Olympia, Fitness Olympia, Figure Olympia, Bikini Olympia, Women's Physique Showdown, and Men's Physique Showdown contests.

== Results ==
| Place | Prize | Name | Country | 1+2 | 4 | Points |
|---|---|---|---|---|---|---|
| 1 | 400,000 $ | Phil Heath | (United States) | 6 | 5 | 11 |
| 2 | 150,000 $ | Dexter Jackson | (United States) | 16 | 10 | 26 |
| 3 | 100,000 $ | Shawn Rhoden | (Jamaica) | 10 | 17 | 27 |
| 4 | 55,000 $ | Dennis Wolf | (Germany) | 15 | 18 | 33 |
| 5 | 45,000 $ | Mamdouh Elssbiay | (Egypt) | 26 | 28 | 54 |
| 6 | 35,000 $ | Branch Warren | (United States) | 36 | 27 | 63 |
| 7 | 25,000 $ | Roelly Winklaar | (Curaçao) | 29 | 35 | 64 |
| 8 | 20,000 $ | William Bonac | (Netherlands) | 45 | 42 | 87 |
| 9 | 18,000 $ | Víctor Martínez | (Dominican Republic) | 48 | 43 | 91 |
| 10 | 16,000 $ | Essa Obaid | (United Arab Emirates) | 43 | 50 | 93 |
| 11 | | Juan Morel | (United States) | 62 | 58 | 120 |
| 12 | | Maxx Charles | (United States) | 59 | 62 | 121 |
| 13 | | Dallas McCarver | (United States) | 60 | 63 | 123 |
| 14 | | Ronny Rockel | (Germany) | 71 | 72 | 143 |
| 15 | | Johnnie O. Jackson | (United States) | 76 | 70 | 146 |
| 16 | | Moe Bannout | (Lebanon) | 80 | 80 | 160 |
| 16 | | Brandon Curry | (United States) | 80 | 80 | 160 |
| 16 | | Jonathan Delarosa | (United States) | 80 | 80 | 160 |
| 16 | | Abdelaziz Jelali | (France) | 80 | 80 | 160 |
| 16 | | Steve Kuclo | (United States) | 80 | 80 | 160 |
| 16 | | Robert Piotrkowicz | (Poland) | 80 | 80 | 160 |
| 16 | | Brad Rowe | (United States) | 80 | 80 | 160 |
| 16 | | Fred Smalls | (United States) | 80 | 80 | 160 |

== See also ==
- 2015 Ms. Olympia
- 2015 Men's Physique Showdown
