= Chris Dickerson (bodybuilder) =

American former professional bodybuilder (1939–2021)

- Professional bodybuilder
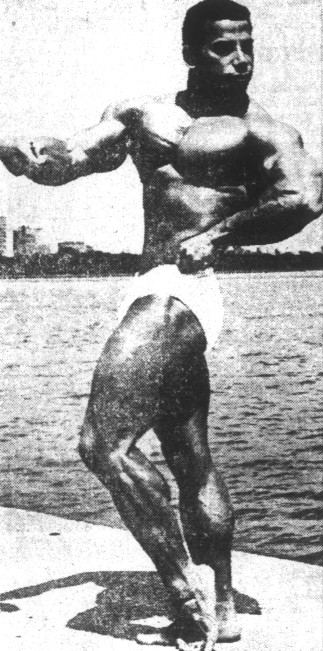
- Dickerson, circa 1970

Personal info
- Born: August 25, 1939; Montgomery, Alabama, U.S.
- Died: December 23, 2021 (aged 82); Fort Lauderdale, Florida, U.S.

Best statistics
- Height: 5 ft 6 in (1.68 m)
- Weight: 195 lb (88 kg)

Professional (Pro) career
- Pro-debut: Mr Atlantic Coast; 1966
- Best win: IFBB Mr. Olympia; 1982
- Predecessor: Franco Columbu
- Successor: Samir Bannout
- Active: 1966–1994

Henri Christophe Dickerson (August 25, 1939 – December 23, 2021) was an American professional bodybuilder.

== Early life ==
Dickerson was born in Montgomery, Alabama, on August 25, 1939. He was the youngest of triplets. His mother, Mahala Ashley Dickerson, was a lawyer and civil rights advocate for women and minorities. He graduated high school at Olney Friends School in 1957. In 1959, he began attending the American Academy of Dramatic Arts in New York City, studying acting, singing, and ballet. There, a teacher recommended he strengthen his chest to strengthen his voice.

== Bodybuilding career ==
One of the world's most titled bodybuilders, Dickerson's competitive career spanned thirty years; he was known for both his heavily muscled, symmetrical physique and for his skills on the posing dais.

After seeing Mr. Universe Bill Pearl in a magazine, Dickerson changed his focus from acting to bodybuilding, and, at age 24, he began training at Pearl's Los Angeles gym. Dickerson first entered a bodybuilding competition in 1965 by taking third place at that year's Mr. Long Beach competition. He turned pro in 1973 and won a total of 15 professional bodybuilding titles across four organizations during his career. Bill Pearl trained and advised him throughout his career.

Dickerson was the first African-American AAU Mr. America, the first openly gay winner of the IFBB Mr. Olympia contest, and one of only two bodybuilders (along with Dexter Jackson) to win titles in both the Mr. Olympia and Masters Olympia competitions.

He won the Mr. Olympia once (1982), a distinction he shares with Samir Bannout (1983) and Dexter Jackson (2008) who have since retired, Shawn Rhoden (2018) who has since died, as well as Brandon Curry (2019), Hadi Choopan (2022), and Samson Dauda (2024) who are currently active.

Dickerson retired after winning the 50+ division at the 1994 Masters Olympia and was inducted into the IFBB Hall of Fame in 2000. Dickerson lived in Florida where he continued to train, conduct seminars, and correspond with current athletes.

== Modeling ==
During the 1960s, Dickerson did much physique modeling. His 1970s nude work for photographer Jim French is today considered some of the best in an admittedly limited field. He appeared in French's hardcover photo essay, Man (1972), and also posed for the photographer ten years later. These photos ran in an issue of Olympus, published by Colt Studios.

== Personal life and death ==
Dickerson was gay.

Dickerson died on December 23, 2021, at age 82, from heart failure.

== Bodybuilding titles ==
- 1966 Mr North America – AAU, 2nd
- 1966 Mr New York State – AAU, Overall Winner
- 1966 Mr Eastern America – AAU, Overall Winner
- 1966 Mr Atlantic Coast – AAU, Overall Winner
- 1966 Junior Mr USA – AAU, Most Muscular, 1st
- 1966 Junior Mr USA – AAU, Winner
- 1967 Mr California – AAU, Winner
- 1967 Mr America – AAU, Most Muscular, 4th
- 1967 Mr America – AAU, 6th
- 1967 Junior Mr America – AAU, Most Muscular, 5th
- 1967 Junior Mr America – AAU, 4th
- 1968 Mr USA – AAU, Most Muscular, 2nd
- 1968 Mr USA – AAU, Winner
- 1968 Mr America – AAU, Most Muscular, 3rd
- 1968 Mr America – AAU, 3rd
- 1968 Junior Mr America – AAU, 3rd
- 1969 Mr America – AAU, 2nd
- 1969 Junior Mr America – AAU, 2nd
- 1970 Universe – NABBA, Short, 1st
- 1970 Mr America – AAU, Most Muscular, 1st
- 1970 Mr America – AAU, Winner
- 1970 Junior Mr America – AAU, Most Muscular, 1st
- 1970 Junior Mr America – AAU, Winner
- 1971 Universe – NABBA, Short, 1st
- 1973 Universe – NABBA, Short, 1st
- 1973 Universe – NABBA, Overall Winner
- 1973 Pro Mr America – WBBG, Winner
- 1974 Universe – Pro – NABBA, Short, 1st
- 1974 Universe – Pro – NABBA, Overall Winner
- 1975 World Championships – WBBG, 2nd
- 1975 Universe – Pro – PBBA, 2nd
- 1976 Universe – Pro – NABBA, Short, 2nd
- 1976 Universe – Pro – NABBA, 3rd
- 1976 Olympus – WBBG, 4th
- 1979 Mr. Olympia – IFBB, Lightweight, 4th
- 1979 Grand Prix Vancouver – IFBB, 2nd
- 1979 Canada Pro Cup – IFBB, Winner
- 1979 Canada Diamond Pro Cup – IFBB, 2nd
- 1980 Pittsburgh Pro Invitational – IFBB, 2nd
- 1980 Mr. Olympia – IFBB, 2nd
- 1980 Night of Champions – IFBB, Winner
- 1980 Grand Prix New York – IFBB, Winner
- 1980 Grand Prix Miami – IFBB, Winner
- 1980 Grand Prix Louisiana – IFBB, 2nd
- 1980 Grand Prix California – IFBB, Winner
- 1980 Florida Pro Invitational – IFBB, Winner
- 1980 Canada Pro Cup – IFBB, Winner
- 1981 Professional World Cup – IFBB, 2nd
- 1981 Mr. Olympia – IFBB, 2nd
- 1981 Night of Champions – IFBB, Winner
- 1981 Grand Prix World Cup – IFBB, 2nd
- 1981 Grand Prix Washington – IFBB, Winner
- 1981 Grand Prix New York – IFBB, Winner
- 1981 Grand Prix New England – IFBB, 2nd
- 1981 Grand Prix Louisiana – IFBB, Winner
- 1981 Grand Prix California – IFBB, Winner
- 1982 Mr. Olympia – IFBB, Winner
- 1984 Mr. Olympia – IFBB, 11th
- 1990 Arnold Classic – IFBB, 8th
- 1994 Masters Olympia – IFBB, Overall, 4th

Mr. Olympia
Preceded by: Franco Columbu	First (1982)	Succeeded by: Samir Bannout
