= Phil Heath =

American bodybuilder

- Professional bodybuilder
- Heath in 2015

Personal info
- Born: December 18, 1979 (age 46); Seattle, Washington, U.S.

Best statistics
- Height: 5 ft 9 in (1.75 m)
- Weight: Contest: 240 lb (109 kg); Off season: 270 lb (120 kg)

Professional (Pro) career
- Pro-debut: Colorado Pro Championships; 2006
- Best win: Mr. Olympia; 2011–2017
- Predecessor: Jay Cutler
- Successor: Shawn Rhoden
- Active: Yes

Phillip Jerrod Heath (born December 18, 1979) is an American IFBB Pro League professional bodybuilder. Known as "the Gift", he is a seven-time Mr. Olympia winner, having won the competition every year from 2011 to 2017. Heath is tied with Arnold Schwarzenegger for the joint-second number of all-time Mr. Olympia wins, behind Ronnie Coleman and Lee Haney, who are joint-first with eight wins each. He was known for his rivalry with Kai Greene.

In October 2024, Heath was inducted into the International Sports Hall of Fame.

== Early life ==
Phillip Jerrod Heath was born in Seattle, Washington, on December 18, 1979. He attended Rainier Beach High School in Seattle, where he was the shooting guard on the varsity basketball team, which won the state title in 1998. He attended the University of Denver on an athletic scholarship, majoring in business administration while playing shooting guard for the university's Division I basketball team.

== Bodybuilding career ==
Heath entered bodybuilding in 2002. In 2005, he won the overall title at the NPC (National Physique Committee) USA Championships, earning the right to compete as an IFBB Pro. He won his first two IFBB professional events the following year: The Colorado Pro Championships and The New York Pro Championship. In 2007, Heath placed fifth at the Arnold Classic. Although he still qualified to compete in the 2007 Mr. Olympia contest, Heath, nevertheless, decided not to enter the contest, stating that he needed additional time to improve his form.

Heath won the 2008 Iron Man show and placed second to Dexter Jackson at the 2008 Arnold Classic. In his 2008 Mr. Olympia debut, Heath finished third to become the first novice to place in the top three since Flex Wheeler in 1993. He claimed the fifth position at the 2009 Mr. Olympia title and second place at the 2010 event. He gained the crown in 2011. Heath defended the title of Mr Olympia consecutively six times since then until 2018 when he placed second to Shawn Rhoden.

== Professional wrestling ==
During the countdown to TNA's Bound for Glory pre-show on October 20, 2013, Heath accompanied The BroMans (Jessie Godderz and Robbie E) to the ring for their tag team gauntlet match, which they won; later in the night, he accompanied them to their TNA World Tag Team Championship match against Gunner and James Storm. After the match, he celebrated their title victory with them in the ring and backstage during an interview.

== Competitive history ==
Competition	2008	2009	2010	2011	2012	2013	2014	2015	2016	2017	2018	2019	2020	SR
Mr. Olympia	3rd	5th	2nd	1st	1st	1st	1st	1st	1st	1st	2nd	A	3rd	7 / 12

- 2003 Northern Colorado State, Novice, Light-Heavyweight 1st and overall
- 2003 NPC Colorado State, Light-Heavyweight, 1st
- 2004 NPC Colorado State, Heavyweight, 1st and Overall
- 2005 NPC Junior Nationals, HeavyWeight, 1st and Overall
- 2005 NPC USA Championships, HeavyWeight, 1st and Overall
- 2006 Colorado Pro Championships, 1st
- 2006 New York Pro Championship, 1st
- 2007 Arnold Classic, 5th
- 2008 IFBB Iron Man, 1st
- 2008 Arnold Classic, 2nd
- 2008 Mr. Olympia, 3rd
- 2009 Mr. Olympia, 5th
- 2010 Arnold Classic, 2nd
- 2010 Mr. Olympia, 2nd
- 2011 Mr. Olympia, 1st
- 2011 Sheru Classic, 1st
- 2012 Mr. Olympia, 1st
- 2012 Sheru Classic, 1st
- 2013 Mr. Olympia, 1st
- 2013 Arnold Classic Europe, 1st
- 2014 Mr. Olympia, 1st
- 2015 Mr. Olympia, 1st
- 2016 Mr. Olympia, 1st
- 2017 Mr. Olympia, 1st
- 2018 Mr. Olympia, 2nd
- 2020 Mr. Olympia, 3rd

== See also ==
- List of male professional bodybuilders

Mr. Olympia
Preceded by: Jay Cutler	Succeeded by: Shawn Rhoden
