= Mr. Olympia =

Annual bodybuilding competition

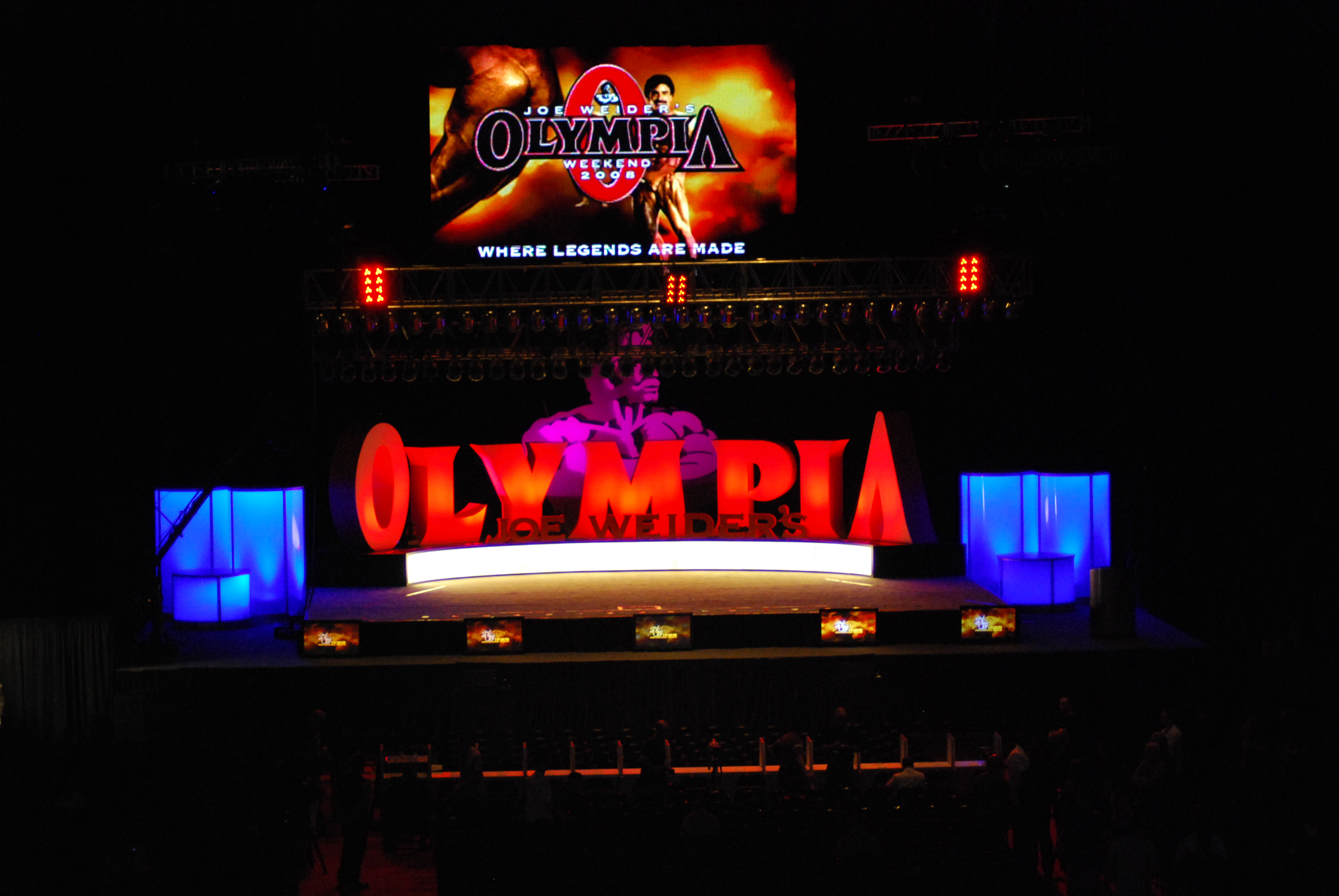
- The 2008 Mr. Olympia stage.
- Status: Active
- Genre: International Fitness and Bodybuilding Federation professional bodybuilding
- Frequency: Annually
- Venue: Orange County Convention Center - West Concourse; 9800 International Dr, Orlando, Florida, United States of America 32819-8706
- Coordinates: 28.4249°N 81.4694°W
- Years active: 61
- Inaugurated: September 18, 1965
- Founder: Joe Weider
- Most recent: 2026 Mr. Olympia
- Previous event: 2025 Mr. Olympia
- Next event: 2027 Mr. Olympia
- Attendance: 30,000 people (2013)
- Organizer: Joe Weider's Olympia Fitness & Performance Weekend
- Website: mrolympia.com

Mr. Olympia is the title awarded to the winner of the professional men's bodybuilding contest in the open division at Olympia Fitness & Performance Weekend—an international bodybuilding competition that is held annually and is sanctioned by the IFBB Professional League. Joe Weider created the contest to enable the amateur Mr. Universe winners to continue competing and to earn money. The first Mr. Olympia was held on September 18, 1965, at the Brooklyn Academy of Music, New York City, with Larry Scott winning his first of two straight titles. The equivalent female title is Ms. Olympia.

The record number of wins is eight each by Lee Haney (1984–1991) and Ronnie Coleman (1998–2005). Nick Walker currently holds the title.

In addition to the Mr. Olympia title in the Open division, other male divisions include the 212 division since 2012, the Men's Physique division since 2013, and the Classic Physique division since 2016.

The film Pumping Iron (1977) featured the buildup to the 1975 Mr. Olympia in Pretoria, South Africa, and helped launch the acting careers of Arnold Schwarzenegger, Lou Ferrigno, and Franco Columbu.

As well as the Ms. Olympia title, female titles include Fitness Olympia and Figure Olympia for fitness and figure competitors. All four contests occur during the same weekend. From 1994 to 2003, and again in 2012, a Masters Olympia was also crowned. Globally, a version with amateur competitors is also presented, the Mr. Olympia Amateur.

== History ==
=== 1960s ===
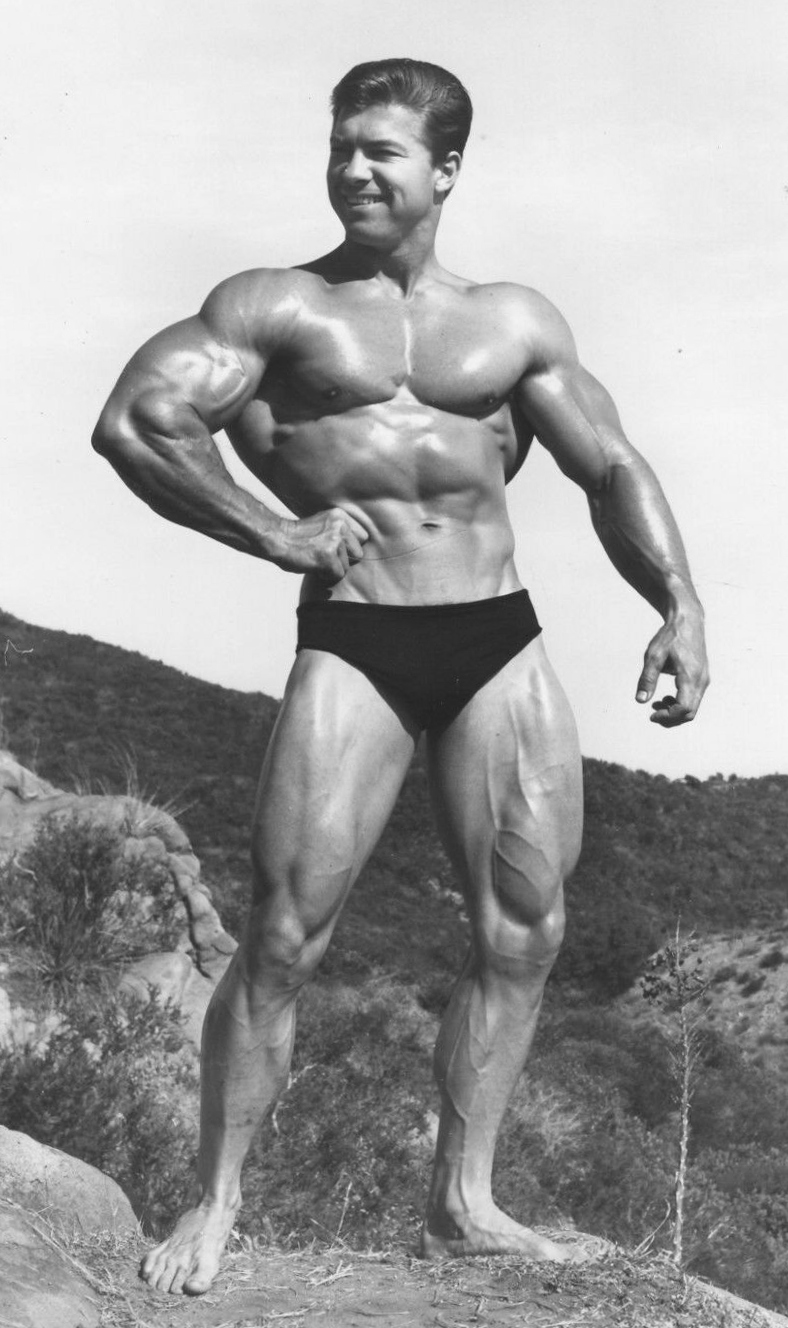
Larry Scott

The 1965 and 1966 Mr. Olympia were won by Larry Scott, a famous bodybuilder of the time. Scott retired after his 1966 victory and attempted to make a comeback in 1979, where he showed a physique that wasn’t at his peak. Following this performance, he retired from competitive bodybuilding in 1980.

Harold Poole holds two Mr. Olympia distinctions: one is that he is the youngest ever competitor to have participated in the Olympia—in 1965 he competed in the first Mr. Olympia at the age of 21; the other is that he was the only man to compete in all three of the initial Mr. Olympia contests.

The 1967 Mr. Olympia, won by Sergio Oliva, heralded a new era in bodybuilding competition. At 5 ft 10 ins and 240 lbs Oliva, nicknamed "The Myth", displayed an unforeseen level of muscle mass and definition, including a "V" shape of a large and a well-formed upper-body that tapered down to a narrow waist.

Oliva would go on to win the Mr. Olympia competition in 1967, 1968 (uncontested), and 1969—where he would defeat Arnold Schwarzenegger four to three, marking Schwarzenegger's only loss in a Mr. Olympia competition.

With the emergence of a performance enhancing drug called Dianabol in 1958, bodybuilders began experimenting more with the idea of unnatural ways to improve their physiques as well as intensify their training regimens. Dianabol was affordable, and the 1960s became a free-for all in terms of experimentation with many kinds of performance enhancing drugs. These anabolic steroids were not only used by bodybuilders, but also by Olympic athletes and NFL players. For example, Schwarzenegger and players on the Pittsburgh Steelers used performance enhancing drugs in the 1960s to 70s to improve both their physiques and performances.

=== 1970s ===
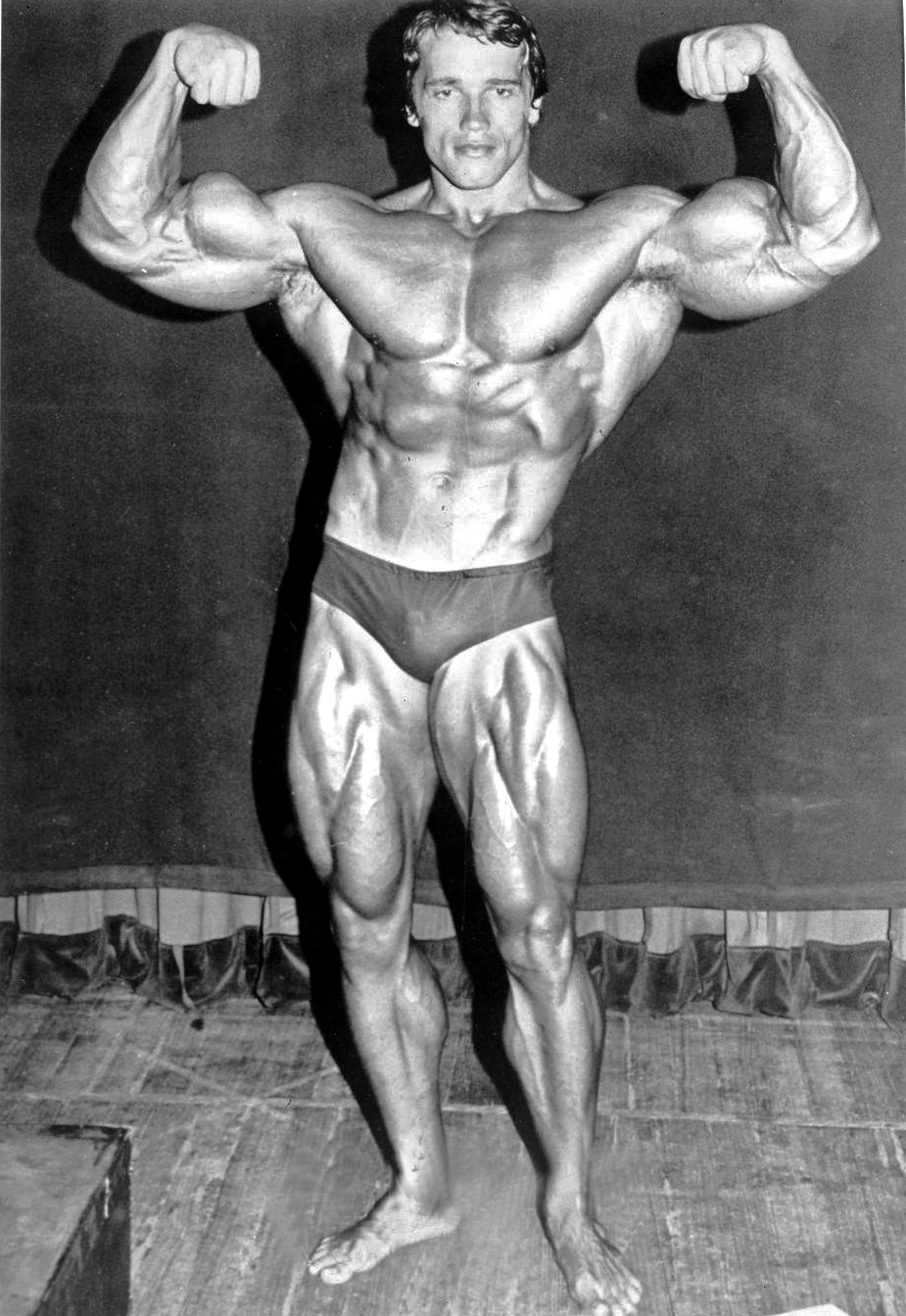
Arnold Schwarzenegger

Schwarzenegger defeated Oliva at the 1970 Mr. Olympia after finishing second the year before, and also won in 1971 (being the only competitor). He defeated Oliva again in 1972, and went on to win the next three Mr. Olympia competitions, including the 1975 edition, which was highlighted in the 1977 docudrama Pumping Iron and featured other notable bodybuilders such as Lou Ferrigno, Serge Nubret, and Franco Columbu, who would go on to win the 1976 and 1981 competitions.

From 1974 until 1979, a dual weight division system was used, splitting competitors into two categories: "Heavyweights" (over 200lbs) and "Lightweights" (under 200lbs). The winners of each division would then compete against each other to decide an overall champion.

After winning the 1975 competition, Schwarzenegger announced his retirement from competitive bodybuilding; this was also depicted in Pumping Iron.

Frank Zane won the 1977, 1978, and 1979 competitions.

The Sandow Trophy was awarded for the first time in 1976, a homage to the widely-recognized "father of modern bodybuilding", Eugen Sandow.

=== 1980s ===
In 1980, Schwarzenegger came out of retirement to win the Olympia yet again, after a five-year hiatus. Schwarzenegger (who was supposedly training for the film Conan the Barbarian) had been a late entry into the competition, and his competitors did not know of his intentions to compete. This seventh victory was especially controversial, as most fellow competitors and observers felt that he lacked both muscle mass and conditioning, and shouldn't have won over Chris Dickerson or Mike Mentzer. Several athletes boycotted the contest the following year, and Mentzer retired for good.

The following year Franco Columbu was victorious for the second time. This result was also controversial, the booing started when Padilla was announced in fifth place, and continued while the rest of the results were declared. Columbu's victory was seen as further evidence the competition was fixed.

Chris Dickerson won his only title in 1982, making him the first openly gay Mr. Olympia. Samir Bannout won his only title in 1983, making the first Lebanese Mr. Olympia.

From 1984 to 1991, Lee Haney won eight consecutive Mr. Olympia titles, setting a record that was later tied by Ronnie Coleman.

=== 1990s ===
From the late 1980s until the 2010s, bodybuilders began to compete with a level of muscle mass surpassing the limits with each edition, which was called the "Mass Monster" era. This era coincided with concerns about the overuse of anabolic steroids in sports, which culminated in the Anabolic Steroids Control Act of 1990.

Haney retired from competitive bodybuilding after his last Mr. Olympia victory in 1991. Having placed second to Haney the previous year, Dorian Yates won the competition six straight times from 1992 until 1997. Dorian is given credit for revolutionizing the sport during his reign as Mr. Olympia by combining larger mass than seen before with what was dubbed "granite hardness".

Yates retired from competitive bodybuilding after his 1997 victory, having accumulated several injuries. Ronnie Coleman, who placed 9th in 1997, surprised everyone with a much improved physique in 1998, winning the first of 8 consecutive titles.

In 1994, a separate Masters Olympia competition for professional bodybuilders was created, to compete at the highest levels in their later years.

=== 2000s ===
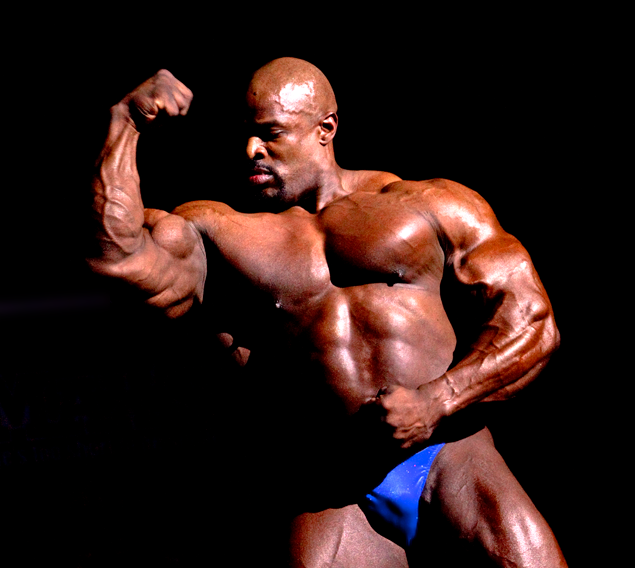
Ronnie Coleman

Ronnie Coleman won the Mr. Olympia competition eight consecutive times from 1998 to 2005, tying the record set by Lee Haney. Coleman, nicknamed "The King", is widely regarded as the greatest bodybuilder in Olympia history.

Coleman returned in 2006 to try to beat the record for Olympia wins but was unable to defend his title, instead placed second to Jay Cutler, who won his first title after four consecutive years of finishing second to Coleman. Cutler successfully defended his title in 2007. Coleman came in fourth place and announced his retirement from competition, ending one of the biggest rivalries in the competition's history.

In 2008, Dexter Jackson defeated Jay Cutler and became Mr. Olympia. In 2009, Jay Cutler returned and regained the title.

=== 2010s ===
In 2010, Cutler returned to claim his fourth Mr. Olympia title, becoming the fifth competitor in Olympia history to win the title more than three times.

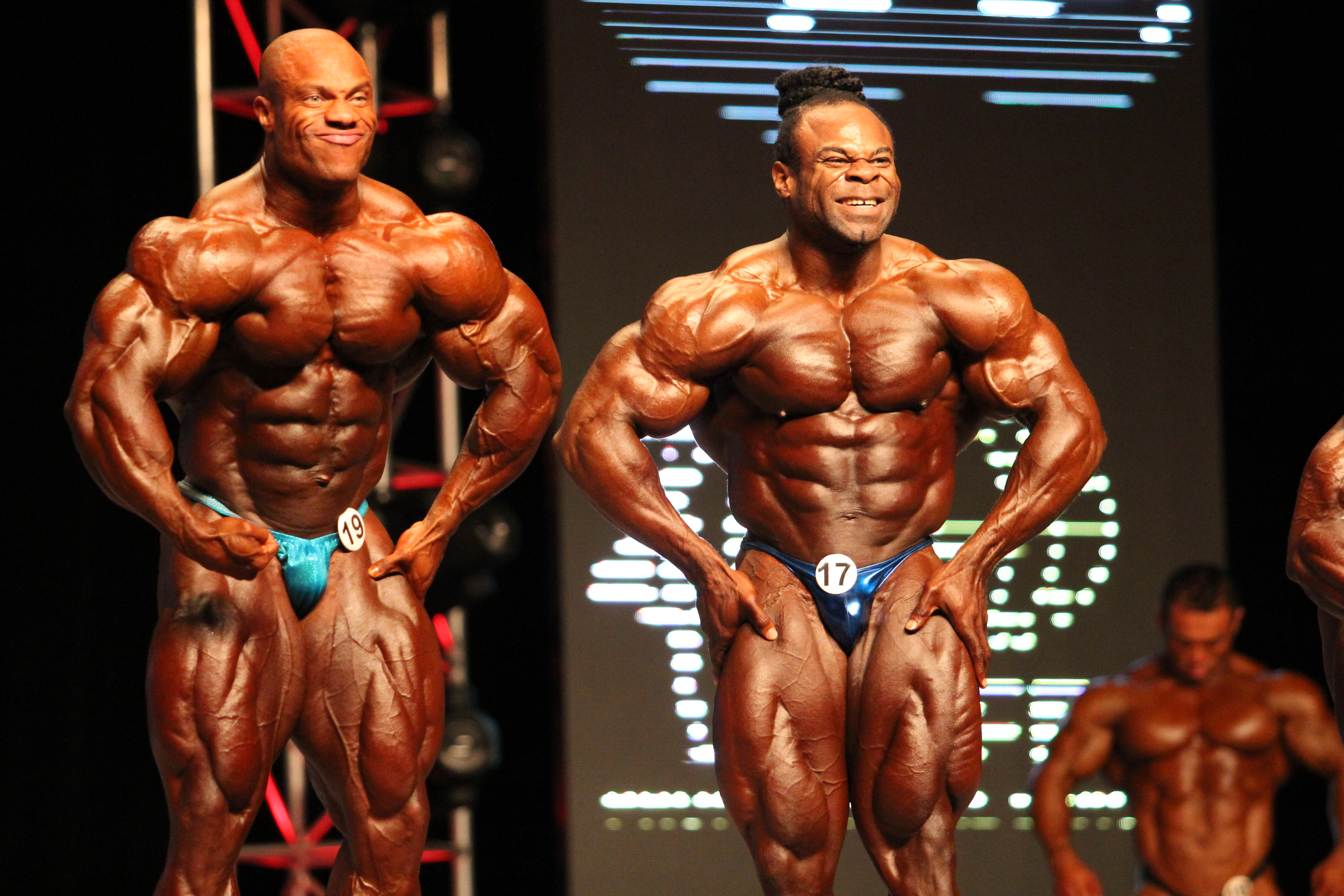
Phil Heath and Kai Greene at the 2012 Mr. Olympia

In 2011, Phil Heath defeated Cutler for the title, beginning a winning streak that lasted until 2018. From 2012 to 2014, the Olympia was dominated by the rivalry between Kai Greene and Heath, with Heath winning all three and Greene placing second.

Starting in 2016, a new division called Classic Physique was introduced, a division that emphasizes symmetry, proportion, pleasing lines, and a small waist, over size and mass. Danny Hester was the inaugural champion in Classic Physique division.

Heath won his seventh-consecutive Mr. Olympia in 2017, with Mamdouh Elssbiay taking second. With his 2017 win, Heath tied Arnold Schwarzenegger for second most Olympia victories, behind Lee Haney and Ronnie Coleman who won eight.

Shawn Rhoden defeated Phil Heath in 2018, snapping Heath's streak of seven victories. The 2019 Mr. Olympia was won by Brandon Curry.

In the 212 Division, James "Flex" Lewis won a record 7 consecutive victories from 2012 to 2018.

Starting in 2018, a new division called Wheelchair Olympia was added.

=== 2020s ===
In 2020 Phil Heath returned for an attempted record-tying eighth title, but Mamdouh Elssbiay won the Olympia for his first title. Elssbiay won for the second time in 2021. Hadi Choopan won in 2022, Derek Lunsford won in 2023 and Samson Dauda won in 2024. Derek Lunsford reclaimed the title in 2025. Nick Walker won the 2026 competition.

In the Classic Physique division, Chris Bumstead won a record six consecutive titles from 2019 to 2024, eventually retiring after his sixth win in 2024. Ramon Rocha Queiroz won in 2025, followed by Niall Darwen in 2026.

== Qualifying ==
The IFBB selects Olympia contestants from among the highest-placed competitors at various qualifying competitions, collectively referred to as the Olympia Qualifying Season. The qualifying season for each Olympia runs for a year, and ends a few months before the competition. Under updated qualifying rules announced by the IFBB in 2019, to qualify for most divisions at the Olympia an IFBB athlete must meet one of the following criteria:

- Place in the top three in their division at the previous Olympia
- Win any of the IFBB qualifying contests
- Rank among the top three in total points awarded for second through fifth place at qualifying competitions

For certain divisions with more than 25 qualifying competitions, slightly different rules are used: The previous Olympia winner is automatically qualified, plus the winner of each qualifying competition and the top five in total points.

The IFBB Professional League also has the discretion to extend special invitations to other competitors.

== Winners ==
=== Chronologically ===
#	Year	Winner(s) (Note: Competition was split into two weight classes from 1974 through 1979, namely Heavyweight (HW) for athletes weighing over 200 lbs and Lightweight (LW) for athletes weighing under 200 lbs. Two winners were selected (one per each category) and the overall champion (in bold text) was decided after a final battle between the two.)		Award	Venue
1	1965	(United States) **Larry Scott**		$1,000	New York, United States
2	1966	(United States) **Larry Scott**		$1,000	New York, United States
3	1967	(Cuba) **Sergio Oliva**		$1,000	New York, United States
4	1968	(Cuba) **Sergio Oliva**		$1,000	New York, United States
5	1969	(Cuba) **Sergio Oliva**		$1,000	New York, United States
6	1970	(Austria) **Arnold Schwarzenegger**		$1,000	New York, United States
7	1971	(Austria) **Arnold Schwarzenegger**		$1,000	Paris, France
8	1972	(Austria) **Arnold Schwarzenegger**		$1,000	Essen, West Germany
9	1973	(Austria) **Arnold Schwarzenegger**		$1,000	New York, United States
10	1974	(Austria) **Arnold Schwarzenegger** (HW)	(Italy) Franco Columbu (LW)	$1,000	New York, United States
11	1975	(Austria) **Arnold Schwarzenegger** (HW)	(Italy) Franco Columbu (LW)	$2,500	(Union of South Africa) Pretoria, South Africa
12	1976	(Italy) **Franco Columbu** (LW)	(United States) Ken Waller (HW)	$5,000	Columbus, United States
13	1977	(United States) **Frank Zane** (LW)	(United States) Robby Robinson (HW)	$5,000	Columbus, United States
14	1978	(United States) **Frank Zane** (LW)	(United States) Robby Robinson (HW)	$15,000	Columbus, United States
15	1979	(United States) **Frank Zane** (LW)	(United States) Mike Mentzer (HW)	$25,000	Columbus, United States
16	1980	(Austria) **Arnold Schwarzenegger**		$25,000	Sydney, Australia
17	1981	(Italy) **Franco Columbu**		$25,000	Columbus, United States
18	1982	(United States) **Chris Dickerson**		$25,000	London, United Kingdom
19	1983	(Lebanon) **Samir Bannout**		$25,000	Munich, West Germany
20	1984	(United States) **Lee Haney**		$50,000	New York, United States
21	1985	(United States) **Lee Haney**		$50,000	Brussels, Belgium
22	1986	(United States) **Lee Haney**		$55,000	Columbus, United States
23	1987	(United States) **Lee Haney**		$55,000	Gothenburg, Sweden
24	1988	(United States) **Lee Haney**		$75,000	Los Angeles, United States
25	1989	(United States) **Lee Haney**		$75,000	Rimini, Italy
26	1990	(United States) **Lee Haney**		$100,000	Chicago, United States
27	1991	(United States) **Lee Haney**		$100,000	Orlando, United States
28	1992	(United Kingdom) **Dorian Yates**		$100,000	Helsinki, Finland
29	1993	(United Kingdom) **Dorian Yates**		$100,000	Atlanta, United States
30	1994	(United Kingdom) **Dorian Yates**		$100,000	Atlanta, United States
31	1995	(United Kingdom) **Dorian Yates**		$110,000	Atlanta, United States
32	1996	(United Kingdom) **Dorian Yates**		$110,000	Chicago, United States
33	1997	(United Kingdom) **Dorian Yates**		$110,000	Los Angeles, United States
34	1998	(United States) **Ronnie Coleman**		$110,000	New York, United States
35	1999	(United States) **Ronnie Coleman**		$110,000	Las Vegas, United States
36	2000	(United States) **Ronnie Coleman**		$110,000	Las Vegas, United States
37	2001	(United States) **Ronnie Coleman**		$110,000	Las Vegas, United States
38	2002	(United States) **Ronnie Coleman**		$110,000	Las Vegas, United States
39	2003	(United States) **Ronnie Coleman**		$110,000	Las Vegas, United States
40	2004	(United States) **Ronnie Coleman**		$120,000	Las Vegas, United States
41	2005	(United States) **Ronnie Coleman**		$150,000	Las Vegas, United States
42	2006	(United States) **Jay Cutler**		$155,000	Las Vegas, United States
43	2007	(United States) **Jay Cutler**		$155,000	Las Vegas, United States
44	2008	(United States) **Dexter Jackson**		$155,000	Las Vegas, United States
45	2009	(United States) **Jay Cutler**		$200,000	Las Vegas, United States
46	2010	(United States) **Jay Cutler**		$200,000	Las Vegas, United States
47	2011	(United States) **Phil Heath**		$200,000	Las Vegas, United States
48	2012	(United States) **Phil Heath**		$250,000	Las Vegas, United States
49	2013	(United States) **Phil Heath**		$250,000	Las Vegas, United States
50	2014	(United States) **Phil Heath**		$275,000	Las Vegas, United States
51	2015	(United States) **Phil Heath**		$400,000	Las Vegas, United States
52	2016	(United States) **Phil Heath**		$400,000	Las Vegas, United States
53	2017	(United States) **Phil Heath**		$400,000	Las Vegas, United States
54	2018	(United States) **Shawn Rhoden**		$400,000	Las Vegas, United States
55	2019	(United States) **Brandon Curry**		$400,000	Las Vegas, United States
56	2020	(Egypt) **Mamdouh Elssbiay**		$400,000	Orlando, United States
57	2021	(Egypt) **Mamdouh Elssbiay**		$400,000	Orlando, United States
58	2022	(Iran) **Hadi Choopan**		$400,000	Las Vegas, United States
59	2023	(United States) **Derek Lunsford**		$400,000	Orlando, United States
60	2024	(United Kingdom) **Samson Dauda**		$600,000	Las Vegas, United States
61	2025	(United States) **Derek Lunsford**		$600,000	Las Vegas, United States
62	2026	(United States) **Nick Walker**		$600,000	Las Vegas, United States

=== Number of overall wins ===
Rank	Mr. Olympia champion	Year(s)	Number of wins		
Rank	Mr. Olympia champion	Year(s)	Overall	Heavyweight	Lightweight
1	(United States) Ronnie Coleman	1998, 1999, 2000, 2001, 2002, 2003, 2004, and 2005	8	0	0
1	(United States) Lee Haney	1984, 1985, 1986, 1987, 1988, 1989, 1990, and 1991	8	0	0
3	(Austria) Arnold Schwarzenegger	1970, 1971, 1972, 1973, 1974 (overall & heavyweight), 1975 (overall & heavyweight), and 1980	7	2	0
3	(United States) Phil Heath	2011, 2012, 2013, 2014, 2015, 2016, and 2017	7	0	0
5	(United Kingdom) Dorian Yates	1992, 1993, 1994, 1995, 1996, and 1997	6	0	0
6	(United States) Jay Cutler	2006, 2007, 2009, and 2010	4	0	0
7	(United States) Frank Zane	1977 (overall & lightweight), 1978 (overall & lightweight), 1979 (overall & lightweight)	3	0	3
7	(Cuba) Sergio Oliva	1967, 1968, and 1969	3	0	0
9	(Italy) Franco Columbu	1974 (lightweight), 1975 (lightweight), 1976 (overall & lightweight), and 1981	2	0	3
9	(Egypt) Mamdouh Elssbiay	2020 and 2021	2	0	0
9	(United States) Larry Scott	1965 and 1966	2	0	0
9	(United States) Derek Lunsford	2023 and 2025	2	0	0
13	(United States) Chris Dickerson	1982	1	0	0
13	(Lebanon) Samir Bannout	1983	1	0	0
13	(United States) Dexter Jackson	2008	1	0	0
13	(Jamaica) Shawn Rhoden	2018	1	0	0
13	(United States) Brandon Curry	2019	1	0	0
13	(Iran) Hadi Choopan	2022	1	0	0
13	(United Kingdom) Samson Dauda	2024	1	0	0
13	(United States) Nick Walker	2026	1	0	0
20	(United States) Robby Robinson	1977 (heavyweight) and 1978 (heavyweight)	0	2	0
21	(United States) Kenny Waller	1976 (heavyweight)	0	1	0
21	(United States) Mike Mentzer	1979 (heavyweight)	0	1	0

=== Number of consecutive wins ===
Rank	Mr. Olympia champion	Years	Number of consecutive wins		
Rank	Mr. Olympia champion	Years	Overall	Heavyweight	Lightweight
1	(United States) Ronnie Coleman	1998, 1999, 2000, 2001, 2002, 2003, 2004 and 2005	8	0	0
1	(United States) Lee Haney	1984, 1985, 1986, 1987, 1988, 1989, 1990 and 1991	8	0	0
3	(United States) Phil Heath	2011, 2012, 2013, 2014, 2015, 2016 and 2017	7	0	0
4	(Austria) Arnold Schwarzenegger	1970, 1971, 1972, 1973, 1974 and 1975	6	2	0
4	(United Kingdom) Dorian Yates	1992, 1993, 1994, 1995, 1996 and 1997	6	0	0
6	(United States) Frank Zane	1977, 1978 and 1979	3	0	3
6	(Cuba) Sergio Oliva	1967, 1968 and 1969	3	0	0
8	(United States) Jay Cutler	2006 and 2007, 2009 and 2010	2	0	0
9	(United States) Larry Scott	1965 and 1966	2	0	0
9	(Egypt) Mamdouh Elssbiay	2020 and 2021	2	0	0

=== Top 3 ===
Year	Champion	Runner-up	3rd Place
1965	(United States) Larry Scott	(United States) Harold Poole	(Barbados) Earl Maynard
1966	(United States) Larry Scott	(United States) Harold Poole	(United States) Chuck Sipes
1967	(Cuba) Sergio Oliva	(United States) Chuck Sipes	(United States) Harold Poole
1968	(Cuba) Sergio Oliva		
1969	(Cuba) Sergio Oliva	(Austria) Arnold Schwarzenegger	
1970	(Austria) Arnold Schwarzenegger	(Cuba) Sergio Oliva	(United States) Reg Lewis
1971	(Austria) Arnold Schwarzenegger		
1972	(Austria) Arnold Schwarzenegger	(Cuba) Sergio Oliva	(France) Serge Nubret
1973	(Austria) Arnold Schwarzenegger	(Italy) Franco Columbu	(France) Serge Nubret
1974	(Austria) Arnold Schwarzenegger	(Italy) Franco Columbu	(United States) Lou Ferrigno & (United States) Frank Zane
1975	(Austria) Arnold Schwarzenegger	(Italy) Franco Columbu	(France) Serge Nubret & (United States) Ed Corney
1976	(Italy) Franco Columbu	(United States) Ken Waller	(United States) Mike Katz & (United States) Frank Zane
1977	(United States) Frank Zane	(United States) Ed Corney	(United States) Robby Robinson
1978	(United States) Frank Zane	(United States) Robby Robinson	(Barbados) Roy Callender
1979	(United States) Frank Zane	(United States) Mike Mentzer	(United States) Dennis Tinerino & (United States) Boyer Coe
1980	(Austria) Arnold Schwarzenegger	(United States) Chris Dickerson	(United States) Frank Zane
1981	(Italy) Franco Columbu	(United States) Chris Dickerson	(United States) Tom Platz
1982	(United States) Chris Dickerson	(United States) Frank Zane	(United States) Casey Viator
1983	(Lebanon) Samir Bannout	(Egypt) Mohamed Makkawy	(United States) Lee Haney
1984	(United States) Lee Haney	(Egypt) Mohamed Makkawy	(Germany) Jusup Wilkosz
1985	(United States) Lee Haney	(Barbados) Albert Beckles	(United States) Rich Gaspari
1986	(United States) Lee Haney	(United States) Rich Gaspari	(United States) Mike Christian
1987	(United States) Lee Haney	(United States) Rich Gaspari	(United States) Lee Labrada
1988	(United States) Lee Haney	(United States) Rich Gaspari	(Netherlands) Berry de Mey
1989	(United States) Lee Haney	(United States) Lee Labrada	(United States) Vince Taylor
1990	(United States) Lee Haney	(United States) Lee Labrada	(United States) Shawn Ray
1991	(United States) Lee Haney	(United Kingdom) Dorian Yates	(United States) Vince Taylor
1992	(United Kingdom) Dorian Yates	(United States) Kevin Levrone	(United States) Lee Labrada
1993	(United Kingdom) Dorian Yates	(United States) Flex Wheeler	(United States) Shawn Ray
1994	(United Kingdom) Dorian Yates	(United States) Shawn Ray	(United States) Kevin Levrone
1995	(United Kingdom) Dorian Yates	(United States) Kevin Levrone	(Federal Republic of Yugoslavia) Nasser El Sonbaty
1996	(United Kingdom) Dorian Yates	(United States) Shawn Ray	(United States) Kevin Levrone
1997	(United Kingdom) Dorian Yates	(Federal Republic of Yugoslavia) Nasser El Sonbaty	(United States) Shawn Ray
1998	(United States) Ronnie Coleman	(United States) Flex Wheeler	(Federal Republic of Yugoslavia) Nasser El Sonbaty
1999	(United States) Ronnie Coleman	(United States) Flex Wheeler	(United States) Chris Cormier
2000	(United States) Ronnie Coleman	(United States) Kevin Levrone	(United States) Flex Wheeler
2001	(United States) Ronnie Coleman	(United States) Jay Cutler	(United States) Kevin Levrone
2002	(United States) Ronnie Coleman	(United States) Kevin Levrone	(United States) Chris Cormier
2003	(United States) Ronnie Coleman	(United States) Jay Cutler	(United States) Dexter Jackson
2004	(United States) Ronnie Coleman	(United States) Jay Cutler	(Venezuela) Gustavo Badell
2005	(United States) Ronnie Coleman	(United States) Jay Cutler	(Venezuela) Gustavo Badell
2006	(United States) Jay Cutler	(United States) Ronnie Coleman	(Dominican Republic) Víctor Martínez
2007	(United States) Jay Cutler	(Dominican Republic) Víctor Martínez	(United States) Dexter Jackson
2008	(United States) Dexter Jackson	(United States) Jay Cutler	(United States) Phil Heath
2009	(United States) Jay Cutler	(United States) Branch Warren	(United States) Dexter Jackson
2010	(United States) Jay Cutler	(United States) Phil Heath	(United States) Branch Warren
2011	(United States) Phil Heath	(United States) Jay Cutler	(United States) Kai Greene
2012	(United States) Phil Heath	(United States) Kai Greene	(Jamaica) Shawn Rhoden
2013	(United States) Phil Heath	(United States) Kai Greene	(Germany) Dennis Wolf
2014	(United States) Phil Heath	(United States) Kai Greene	(Jamaica) Shawn Rhoden
2015	(United States) Phil Heath	(United States) Dexter Jackson	(Jamaica) Shawn Rhoden
2016	(United States) Phil Heath	(Jamaica) Shawn Rhoden	(United States) Dexter Jackson
2017	(United States) Phil Heath	(Egypt) Mamdouh Elssbiay	(Netherlands) William Bonac
2018	(United States) Shawn Rhoden	(United States) Phil Heath	(Curaçao) Roelly Winklaar
2019	(United States) Brandon Curry	(Netherlands) William Bonac	(Iran) Hadi Choopan
2020	(Egypt) Mamdouh Elssbiay	(United States) Brandon Curry	(United States) Phil Heath
2021	(Egypt) Mamdouh Elssbiay	(United States) Brandon Curry	(Iran) Hadi Choopan
2022	(Iran) Hadi Choopan	(United States) Derek Lunsford	(United States) Nick Walker
2023	(United States) Derek Lunsford	(Iran) Hadi Choopan	(United Kingdom) Samson Dauda
2024	(United Kingdom) Samson Dauda	(Iran) Hadi Choopan	(United States) Derek Lunsford
2025	(United States) Derek Lunsford	(Iran) Hadi Choopan	(Nigeria) Chinedu Andrew Obiekea
2026	(United States) Nick Walker	(United Kingdom) Samson Dauda	(United States) Derek Lunsford

== Medals ==
=== Men's Open ===
A total of 274 bodybuilders have represented 47 nations across 59 competitions as of 2023.

Rank (Note: Ranking is determined first by the total number of gold medals, secondly by total number of silver medals, thirdly by total number of bronze medals, fourthly by best position each country has placed and then lastly by total number of athletes have represented a country at Mr Olympia.)	Country (Note: It is common for bodybuilders to represent countries they were not born in. This table only includes the countries officially represented at Mr Olympia by open category bodybuilders. For example, Shawn Rhoden was Jamaican born but only represented the United States at Mr Olympia. Therefore his results were officially recorded as representing the United States on each final results paper. Jamaica has never been officially represented on paper at Mr Olympia to date so far. This is the same way in which results are recorded in every other major international sporting event.)	Bodybuilders	Best	(gold) (Note: Includes both the heavyweight and lightweight categories between 1974 and 1979.)	(silver)	(bronze)	Total
1st	United States	126	1st	41	48	40	129
2nd	United Kingdom	16	1st	7	1	1	9
3rd	Austria	1	1st	7	1		8
4th	Italy	8	1st	4	1		5
5th	Cuba	1	1st	3	2		5
6th	Egypt	5	1st	2	3		5
7th	Iran	3	1st	1	3	2	6
8th	Lebanon	4	1st	1			1
9th	Barbados	6	2nd		2	2	4
10th	France	8	2nd		1	2	3
11th	Netherlands	6	2nd		1	2	3
12th	FR Yugoslavia (1992–2002)	2	2nd		1	2	3
13th	Dominican Republic	1	2nd		1	1	2
14th	Australia	6	2nd		1		1
15th	Germany (Unified)	15	3rd			2	2
16th	Venezuela	1	3rd			2	2
17th	Curaçao	1	3rd			1	1
17th	Hungary	1	3rd			1	1
19th	United Arab Emirates	2	5th				
20th	Algeria	1	5th				
21st	Poland	4	6th				
22nd	Canada	11	7th				
23rd	Slovakia	3	7th				
23rd	Spain	3	7th				
25th	Switzerland	2	7th				
26th	Trinidad and Tobago	1	7th				
27th	Brazil	3	8th				
27th	Czech Republic	3	8th				
29th	Nigeria	1	8th				
30th	Japan	1	9th				
31st	Jordan	2	10th				
32nd	Puerto Rico	1	11th				
33rd	Ukraine	2	13th				
34th	Denmark	1	13th				
35th	Russia	3	16th				
36th	Finland	2	16th				
36th	Norway	2	16th				
36th	Sweden	2	16th				
=39th	Czechoslovakia (1989–1991)	1	16th				
39th	Greece	1	16th				
39th	India	1	16th				
39th	Ireland	1	16th				
39th	Morocco	1	16th				
=39th	Yugoslavia (1991)	1	16th				
39th	Bahamas	1	16th				
46th	Turkey	1	17th				
	Libya	1	TBC 2023				

== Classic Physique ==
#	Year	Winner	Award	Venue
1	2016	(United States) Danny Hester	$12,500	Las Vegas, United States
2	2017	(United States) Breon Ansley	$20,000	Las Vegas, United States
3	2018	(United States) Breon Ansley	$20,000	Las Vegas, United States
4	2019	(Canada) Chris Bumstead	$30,000	Las Vegas, United States
5	2020	(Canada) Chris Bumstead	$30,000	Orlando, United States
6	2021	(Canada) Chris Bumstead	$50,000	Orlando, United States
7	2022	(Canada) Chris Bumstead	$50,000	Las Vegas, United States
8	2023	(Canada) Chris Bumstead	$50,000	Orlando, United States
9	2024	(Canada) Chris Bumstead	$50,000	Las Vegas, United States
10	2025	(Brazil) Ramon Queiroz	$100,000	Las Vegas, United States
11	2026	(United Kingdom) Niall Darwen	$100,000	Las Vegas, United States

=== Top 3 ===
Year	Champion	Runner-up	3rd Place
2016	(United States) Danny Hester	(Iran) Arash Rahbar	(Bosnia and Herzegovina) Sadik Hadzovic
2017	(United States) Breon Ansley	(Canada) Chris Bumstead	(United States) George Peterson
2018	(United States) Breon Ansley	(Canada) Chris Bumstead	(United States) George Peterson
2019	(Canada) Chris Bumstead	(United States) Breon Ansley	(United States) George Peterson
2020	(Canada) Chris Bumstead	(United States) Terrence Ruffin	(United States) Breon Ansley
2021	(Canada) Chris Bumstead	(United States) Terrence Ruffin	(United States) Breon Ansley
2022	(Canada) Chris Bumstead	(Brazil) Ramon Queiroz	(Germany) Urs Kalecinski
2023	(Canada) Chris Bumstead	(Brazil) Ramon Queiroz	(Germany) Urs Kalecinski
2024	(Canada) Chris Bumstead	(Germany) Mike Sommerfeld	(Germany) Urs Kalecinski
2025	(Brazil) Ramon Queiroz	(Germany) Mike Sommerfeld	(United States) Terrence Ruffin
2026	(United Kingdom) Niall Darwen	(Germany) Mike Sommerfeld	(Brazil) Ramon Rocha Queiroz

== Men's (202-212) division ==
#	Year	Winner	Venue
1	2008	(United States) David Henry	Las Vegas, United States
2	2009	(United States) Kevin English	Las Vegas, United States
3	2010	(United States) Kevin English	Las Vegas, United States
4	2011	(United States) Kevin English	Las Vegas, United States
5	2012	(United Kingdom) James "Flex" Lewis	Las Vegas, United States
6	2013	(United Kingdom) James "Flex" Lewis	Las Vegas, United States
7	2014	(United Kingdom) James "Flex" Lewis	Las Vegas, United States
8	2015	(United Kingdom) James "Flex" Lewis	Las Vegas, United States
9	2016	(United Kingdom) James "Flex" Lewis	Las Vegas, United States
10	2017	(United Kingdom) James "Flex" Lewis	Las Vegas, United States
11	2018	(United Kingdom) James "Flex" Lewis	Las Vegas, United States
12	2019	(Libya) Kamal Elgargni	Las Vegas, United States
13	2020	(United States) Shaun Clarida	Orlando, United States
14	2021	(United States) Derek Lunsford	Orlando, United States
15	2022	(United States) Shaun Clarida	Las Vegas, United States
16	2023	(United States) Keone Pearson	Orlando, United States
17	2024	(United States) Keone Pearson	Las Vegas, United States
18	2025	(United States) Keone Pearson	Las Vegas, United States
18	2026	(United States) Keone Pearson	Las Vegas, United States

== Men's Physique ==
#	Year	Winner	Venue
1	2013	(United States) Mark Anthony Wingson	Las Vegas, United States
2	2014	(United States) Jeremy Buendia	Las Vegas, United States
3	2015	(United States) Jeremy Buendia	Las Vegas, United States
4	2016	(United States) Jeremy Buendia	Las Vegas, United States
5	2017	(United States) Jeremy Buendia	Las Vegas, United States
6	2018	(United States) Brandon Hendrickson	Las Vegas, United States
7	2019	(United States) Raymont Edmonds	Las Vegas, United States
8	2020	(United States) Brandon Hendrickson	Orlando, United States
9	2021	(United States) Brandon Hendrickson	Orlando, United States
10	2022	(United States) Erin Banks	Las Vegas, United States
11	2023	(United Kingdom) Ryan Terry	Orlando, United States
12	2024	(United Kingdom) Ryan Terry	Las Vegas, United States
13	2025	(United Kingdom) Ryan Terry	Las Vegas, United States
14	2026	(United Kingdom) Ryan Terry	Las Vegas, United States

== Mr. Olympia Amateur ==
Mr. Olympia Amateur is a competition that globally awards the best amateur competitors with an IFBB Pro Card, bringing them closer to competing in the main Mr. Olympia. According to the official website as of March 2022, the event is presented in regions with a specific organization around the world: India, Pakistan, Eastern Europe, Beijing (China), Spain, Portugal, Brazil, South Korea, Italy, Japan, South America, Las Vegas (USA). Mr. Olympia 2025 starts from 6–12 October in Las Vegas, Nevada.

== See also ==
- Ms. Olympia
