= 1973 Mr. Olympia =

1973 IFBB Professional Bodybuilding Competition

The 1973 Mr. Olympia contest was an IFBB professional bodybuilding competition held on September 8, 1973, at the Brooklyn Academy of Music in Brooklyn, New York. It was the 9th Mr. Olympia competition held. The prize money for this event went down from previous years, from $1000, to only $750. Arnold gave a short speech and complained about this after he won the competition.

== Results ==
Place	Prize	Name
1	$750	(Austria) Arnold Schwarzenegger
2		(Italy) Franco Columbu
3		(France) Serge Nubret

== Notable events ==
- Arnold Schwarzenegger won his fourth consecutive Mr. Olympia title breaking the previous record held by Sergio Oliva
- Sergio Oliva was originally slated to compete at the event, but was barred from competing by the IFBB for appearing in the 1972 WBBG Mr. Galaxy contest which was not an IFBB certified event
