= Essa Obaid =

Essa Obaid may refer to:

- Essa Obaid (footballer) (born 1984), United Arab Emirates footballer
- Essa Obaid (bodybuilder) (born 1979), United Arab Emirates bodybuilder
