= 2014 Mr. Olympia =

2014 professional bodybuilding competition

- Genre: Professional bodybuilding competition
- Begins: September 18, 2014
- Ends: September 21, 2014
- Venue: Las Vegas Convention Center and Orleans Arena
- Locations: Winchester, Nevada and Paradise, Nevada
- Country: United States
- Previous event: 2013 Mr. Olympia
- Next event: 2015 Mr. Olympia
- Organizer: IFBB
- People: Winner: Phil Heath

The 2014 Mr. Olympia contest was an IFBB professional bodybuilding competition and part of Joe Weider's Olympia Fitness & Performance Weekend 2014 that was held on September 18–21, 2014, at the South Hall in the Las Vegas Convention Center in Winchester, Nevada and in the Orleans Arena at The Orleans Hotel and Casino in Paradise, Nevada. It was the 50th Mr. Olympia competition celebrated. Other events at the exhibition included the 212 Olympia Showdown, Ms. Olympia, Fitness Olympia, Figure Olympia, Bikini Olympia, Women's Physique Showdown, and Men's Physique Showdown contests.

This was the last of three consecutive years in which Phil Heath finished first and Kai Greene was second. They had a heated exchange on stage during prejudging. It was also the last Olympia for Greene.

== Results ==
A total prize pool of $710,000 was awarded.

Place	Prize	Name	Country	1+2	4	Points
1	$275,000	Phil Heath	(United States)	5	5	10
2	$130,000	Kai Greene	(United States)	10	10	20
3	$90,000	Shawn Rhoden	(Jamaica)	15	15	30
4	$55,000	Dennis Wolf	(Germany)	20	20	40
5	$45,000	Dexter Jackson	(United States)	27	25	52
6	$35,000	Branch Warren	(United States)	30	35	65
7	$25,000	Mamdouh Elssbiay	(Egypt)	35	31	66
8	$20,000	Víctor Martínez	(Dominican Republic)	36	38	74
9	$19,000	Steve Kuclo	(United States)	49	50	99
10	$16,000	Juan Morel	(United States)	50	56	106
11	$4000	Johnnie O. Jackson	(United States)	58	53	111
12	$4000	Roelly Winklaar	(Curaçao)	58	54	112
13	$4000	Fred Smalls	(United States)	67	72	139
14	$4000	Jonathan DeLaRosa	(United States)	71	70	141
15	$4000	William Bonac	(Netherlands)	74	71	145
16	$2000	Jojo Ntiforo	(United States)	80	80	160
16	$2000	Ibrahim Fahim	(Egypt)	80	80	160

== See also ==
- 2014 Ms. Olympia
- 2014 Men's Physique Showdown
