= 2017 Mr. Olympia =

Bodybuilding competition

- Genre: Professional bodybuilding competition
- Country: United States
- Previous event: 2016 Mr. Olympia
- Next event: 2018 Mr. Olympia
- Organizer: IFBB
- People: Mr. Olympia : Phil Heath 212 Olympia: Flex Lewis; Bikini Olympia: Angelica Teixeira; CP Olympia: Breon Ansley; MP Olympia: Jeremy Buendia; WP Olympia: Juliana Malacarne; Fitness Olympia: Oksana Grishina Figure Olympia: Cydney Gillon

The 2017 Mr. Olympia contest was a weekend long IFBB professional bodybuilding competition that was held on September 14 to 17, 2017, in Las Vegas, Nevada. This was the 53rd Mr. Olympia competition celebrated. The weekend competition is also known as the Joe Weider's Olympia Fitness and Performance Weekend. While the main event was the competition for the title of Mr. Olympia, several other events were held which includes the Amateur competition (the wellness category reached the amateur version of the tournament) and sports expo.

On September 14, 2017, a press conference was held on Orleans Arena.

On September 15, 2017, prejudging and finals for Fitness Olympia, Figure Olympia and Classic Physique were held and livestream via Amazon Prime. Mr. Olympia pre-judging was also held on the same night.

On September 16, 2017, the Men's Physique Olympia and Women's Physique Olympia judging and finals were held in the morning at Las Vegas Convention Center. At night, the Bikini Olympia, 212 Olympia and Mr. Olympia finals were held at Orleans Arena. This event was also livestream via Amazon Prime.

On September 17, 2017, an Olympia Superstar Seminar was held.

Phil Heath won his seventh consecutive Mr Olympia title, equalling Arnold Schwarzenegger's seven wins. The record number of wins is eight, held by Lee Haney (1984–1991), and Ronnie Coleman (1998–2005).

== Results ==
Place	Prize	Name	Country	Judging	Finals	Total
1	$400,000	Phil Heath	(United States)	5	5	10
2	$150,000	Mamdouh Elssbiay	(Egypt)	13	12	25
3	$100,000	William Bonac	(Netherlands)	12	15	27
4	$55,000	Dexter Jackson	(United States)	20	20	40
5	$45,000	Shawn Rhoden	(Jamaica)	30	26	56
6	$35,000	Roelly Winklaar	(Curaçao)	29	29	58
7	$25,000	Nathan De Asha	(France)	34	36	70
8	$20,000	Brandon Curry	(United States)	36	39	75
9	$18,000	Josh Lenartowicz	(Australia)	45	45	90
10	$16,000	Cedric McMillan	(United States)	50	50	100
11		Lionel Beyeke	(France)	58	55	113
12		Lukáš Osladil	(Czech Republic)	59	55	114
13		Maxx Charles	(United States)	65	55	120
14		Johnnie O. Jackson	(United States)	69	55	124
15		Gerald Williams	(United States)	73	55	128

== Other results ==
- Flex Lewis won his 6th consecutive 212 Olympia title.
- Angelica Teixeira is the 2017 Bikini Olympia Champion.
- Jeremy Buendia defended his Men's Physique Olympia title for the fourth consecutive time.
- Juliana Malacarne defended her Women's Physique Olympia title and won for the fourth consecutive time.
- Breon Ansley topped the Classic Physique division.
- Oksana Grishina won Fitness Olympia for the fourth time.
- Cydney Gillon is the 2017 Figure Olympia Champion.
