= Ryan Terry (bodybuilder) =

British bodybuilder (born 1988)

- Professional bodybuilder

Personal info
- Born: 1988 (age 37–38); Worksop, Nottinghamshire, England

Best statistics
- Height: 5 ft 10 in (1.78 m)
- Weight: 200 lb (91 kg) (contest)

Professional (Pro) career
- Pro-debut: IFBB Grand Prix; 2014
- Best win: Men's Physique Olympia champion; 2023, 2024, 2025, 2026
- Predecessor: Erin Banks
- Active: 2010–present

Ryan Terry (born 1988) is a British professional bodybuilder who competes in the Men's Physique division of the IFBB Pro League. He is the reigning Men's Physique champion at Mr. Olympia, having won the title four years running from 2023 to 2026, which equalled Jeremy Buendia's record in the division.

Terry grew up in Worksop, Nottinghamshire, and worked as a plumber and gas engineer before he competed full time. He won Mr Great Britain in 2010, turned professional in 2013, and had competed at the Olympia since 2015 without winning it, finishing second in 2016 and third in 2018. He has also won the Men's Physique title at the Arnold Classic in three countries: Spain in 2013 as an amateur, the United States in 2017 and the United Kingdom in 2021.

== Early life ==
Terry grew up in Worksop, Nottinghamshire, where he attended St John's Church of England Primary School and the Elizabethan school. He started training at a gym when he was 14. Before he competed full time he worked as a plumber, a pot washer and a removals man, and qualified in plumbing and gas fitting.

== Career ==
Terry won Mr Great Britain and the Mister International contest in Indonesia in 2010. He moved into the Men's Physique division and won the category at the 2013 Arnold Classic Europe in Spain as an amateur, which earned him an IFBB professional card.

He made his professional debut at the 2014 IFBB Grand Prix. In 2015 he took his first professional win at the Pittsburgh Pro and placed fourth on his Olympia debut. He finished second at the 2016 Olympia, and in 2017 won the Men's Physique title at the Arnold Classic in Columbus, Ohio. He told the Worksop Guardian in 2018 that Arnold Schwarzenegger had interviewed him on stage after the win.

Terry placed third at the 2018 Olympia and fifth in 2019, and won the Asia Grand Prix in 2017 and 2019. After finishing eighth at the 2020 Olympia, he won the first Arnold Classic UK in October 2021, which made him the only competitor to have won the Arnold Classic Men's Physique title in three countries. He placed seventh at the 2022 Olympia.

=== Olympia titles ===
After winning the 2023 New York Pro to qualify, Terry won the Men's Physique Olympia in Orlando in November 2023, taking the title from the defending champion Erin Banks. He said afterwards that he would have stopped competing had he lost. He defended the title in Las Vegas in October 2024, finishing ahead of Ali Bilal, and won again in October 2025, with Bilal second for a second year.

On 26 September 2026, at the Orleans Arena in Las Vegas, Terry won a fourth consecutive title with a score of five points, ahead of Bilal and Kyron Holden. The win equalled Buendia's record of four Men's Physique Olympia titles, which Buendia won consecutively between 2014 and 2017, and made Terry the first competitor to win four in a row since Buendia.

== Competitive record ==
IFBB Pro League results
Year	Contest	Placing
2014	IFBB Grand Prix	16th
2014	Europa Super Show	10th
2015	Miami Muscle Beach Pro	2nd
2015	Pittsburgh Pro	1st
2015	Mr. Olympia (Men's Physique)	4th
2016	Arnold Sports Festival	4th
2016	Mr. Olympia (Men's Physique)	2nd
2017	Arnold Sports Festival	1st
2017	Mr. Olympia (Men's Physique)	6th
2017	Asia Grand Prix	1st
2018	Mr. Olympia (Men's Physique)	3rd
2019	Mr. Olympia (Men's Physique)	5th
2019	Asia Grand Prix	1st
2020	Mr. Olympia (Men's Physique)	8th
2021	Arnold Classic UK	1st
2022	Mr. Olympia (Men's Physique)	7th
2023	Pittsburgh Pro	2nd
2023	New York Pro	1st
2023	Mr. Olympia (Men's Physique)	1st
2024	Mr. Olympia (Men's Physique)	1st
2025	Mr. Olympia (Men's Physique)	1st
2026	Mr. Olympia (Men's Physique)	1st

== Personal life ==
Terry runs a gym in Nottinghamshire under the RT Fit name, along with coaching and meal preparation businesses. He has said that becoming a father changed how he approaches competition.
