= The Cop (1970 film) =

1970 film

- French film poster
- Directed by: Yves Boisset
- Screenplay by: Claude Veillot; Yves Boisset
- Based on: La Mort d'un condé by Pierre-Vial Lesou
- Starring: Michel Bouquet
- Cinematography: Jean-Marc Ripert
- Edited by: Albert Jurgenson
- Music by: Antoine Duhamel
- Production companies: Stéphan Films; Empire Films
- Release dates: October 3, 1970 (Italy); October 9, 1970 (France)
- Running time: 98 minutes
- Countries: France; Italy

The Cop (French: Un condé, Italian: L'uomo venuto da Chicago) is a 1970 crime film directed by Yves Boisset. It features Michel Bouquet as Inspector Favenin and Françoise Fabian as Hélène Dassa.

The film is about a committed policeman in a crooked police force who concludes that the only way to avenge the murder of a colleague by criminals is to use their own weapons of beatings and shootings.

== Plot ==
Inspector Favenin, after being posted away for indiscipline, returns to duty and links up with his old friend Barnero. The two start investigating the murder of Dassa, a bar owner who refused to let his premises be used for distributing the drugs of Tavernier, the local crime lord who is protected by police and politicians. When Dassa's sister arrives to settle his affairs, the goons who murdered her brother beat her up and wreck the bar.

Rover, an old friend of Dassa, hides the girl on his stud farm and decides to get revenge. He enlists Villetti, a fellow ex-mercenary, to murder Tavernier as he leaves his private gambling club. An alibi is secured from a third colleague, Aulnay, who will swear that the two were playing cards with him and his wife. Rover and Villetti succeed in murdering Tavernier but, as they escape along the roof, encounter Favenin and Barnero. The warning shots of the two policemen are returned and Barnero is killed.

When Favenin's demand to lead the hunt for the killer in his own way is accepted, he first tracks down the two goons who were also in the club. After shooting one for failure to co-operate, he gets the name of Villetti from the other. Tracking down Villetti, he explains to him that the only sure way to get revenge will be to shoot him. Villetti agrees, but points out before the trigger is pulled that this makes Favenin no better than a criminal. Meanwhile, the police have tracked down and arrested Rover, who gives nothing away despite being beaten. Favenin tracks down Aulnay, who persists in the false alibi despite a beating.

After this trail of beatings and deaths, Favenin is again suspended and, sending his wife away to safety, stays alone in his riverside home. Aulnay tracks him down and informs both Rover, who is in jail pending trial, and Dassa's sister. The girl goes to confront Favenin, but both are unaware that Rover has escaped. Guessing where he will be heading, a strong force of police surround Favenin's house. When the armed Rover confronts Favenin, police fire brings him down. Favenin hands over a written report of his investigations, which ends with his resignation.

== Cast ==
- Michel Bouquet as L'inspecteur Favenin
- Françoise Fabian as Hélène Dassa
- Gianni Garko as Dan Rover (as John Garko)
- Michel Constantin as Viletti
- Rufus as Raymond Aulnay
- Anne Carrère as Christine
- Théo Sarapo as Lupo
- Henri Garcin as Georges Duval, dit 'Georgy Beausourire'
- Pierre Massimi as Robert Dassa
- Bernard Fresson as L'inspecteur Barnero
- Adolfo Celi as Le commissaire principal / Chief of police
- Jean-Claude Bercq as Germain (as Jean-Claude Berck)
- Serge Nubret as Le Noir

== Production ==
Un conde was based on La Mort d'un condé by Pierre-Vial Lesou. The screenplay was written by Claude Veillot and director Yves Boisset. It was a French and Italian co-production between the Paris-based Stéphan Films and Rome-based Empire Films.

== Release ==
The Cop's violent and political content gave the film trouble in passing censors for release. It was initially submitted on July 17, 1970 for review which included the subcommission who included Minister of Interior Raymond Marcellin who recommended the film be banned due to as it made "the French police seem nothing less than a sort of Gestapo." This response had Véra Belmont enact countermeasures organize a private screening after which her colleague André Michelin pleased with the subcommission's president Henry de Ségogne to give the film a chance even if it meant discussing with Boisset in order to perform cuts. This led to a two-hour debate on July 30, which involved all 27 members of the commission, which included director Jean-Pierre Melville, which led to a verdict overturned after a secret ballot, leading to Un condé not being banned by a two-vote majority. The minister in charge of cultural affairs, Edmond Michelet demanded a new examination because of Marcellin's comments on the film's content, which postponed the original release date which was scheduled for September 16.The new examination of the film did not occur as there are no evidence of any ministerial papers. Cuts were made to the film that according to Le Monde, led to a running time of 98 minutes. Boisset refused arguing that these cuts would "destroy entirely the coherence and comprehension of the film." According to Boisset, the cuts were reduced to eight minutes, which involved calling Garko back from Italy to re-shoot the interrogation scene to be more accptable and less violent.

It was released in Italy on October 3, 1970 as L'uomo venuto da Chicago (lit. 'The Man from Chicago') where it was distributed by Fida Distribuzione. It grossed roughly 275 million Italian lira.

It was released in France on October 9, 1970, nearly three weeks after its scheduled release date. While initially being shown in nine venues, the next week it became the highest in the box office in France. The authors of French Thrillers of the 1970s: Volume I, Crime Films, Roberto Curti and Frank Lafond, described the film as a commercial success, with over 1,328,000 spectators and finishing 27th among the year's top grossing films in France.

It was released in the New York on May 26, 1971 as The Cop. It was distributed uncut and subtitled as The Cop by Radley Metzger's Audubon Films. It was released in the United Kingdom as Blood on My Hands. The film was released as The Cop on blu-ray by Kino Lorber on September 6, 2022.

== Reception ==
Curti and Lafond wrote that critics were less impressed with the film. Jean de Baroncelli in Le Monde found the film "much less aggressive than many American works, old or recent" and ultimately calling it "an average quality film which confirms Yves Boisset's skills" and "worth above all for Michel Bouquet's astonishing turn." Alternatively, Positif called it Boisset's best film to date.
