= Shawn Rhoden =

Jamaican-American bodybuilder

- Professional bodybuilder
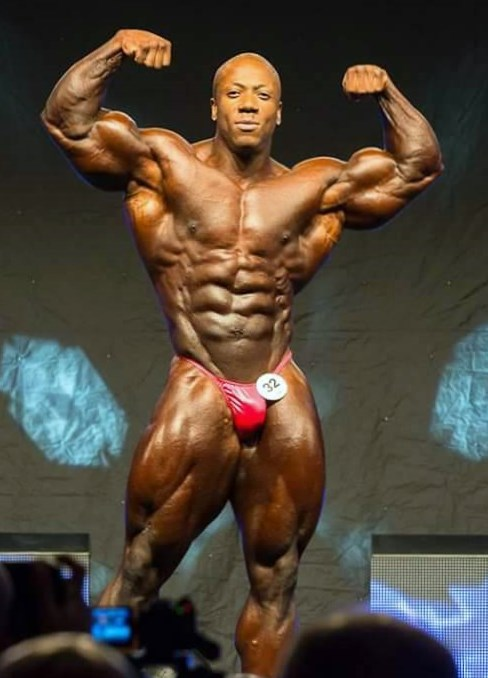
- Rhoden in December 2015

Personal info
- Nickname: Flexatron, Jamaican Muscle Machine
- Born: April 2, 1975; Kingston, Jamaica
- Died: November 5, 2021 (aged 46); Las Vegas, Nevada, U.S.

Best statistics
- Height: 5 ft 10 in (1.78 m)
- Weight: Contest: 245 lb (111 kg); Off season: 255 lb (116 kg)

Professional (Pro) career
- Pro-debut: IFBB Europa Super Show; 2010
- Best win: Mr. Olympia; 2018
- Predecessor: Phil Heath
- Successor: Brandon Curry

Shawn Rhoden (April 2, 1975 – November 6, 2021) was a Jamaican-American IFBB Pro professional bodybuilder and past Mr. Olympia. He won the 2018 Mr. Olympia contest by defeating seven-time Mr. Olympia Phil Heath.

== Early life ==
Born in Kingston, Jamaica, Rhoden immigrated to the United States in 1990 and settled in Maryland. He went through a period of alcohol addiction following the death of his father, Lloyd, in 2002 but overcame it with help from his friend Lenore Carroll.

== Career ==
An aspiring soccer player in his early teens, Rhoden started bodybuilding in 1992 with inspiration from a past IFBB Mr. Universe winner, Yohnnie Shambourger. He first competed in bodybuilding as a teenager, and won his first show weighing only 154 pounds. After an amateur career marked by several injuries and alcohol dependence, and after seven years away from bodybuilding stages, Rhoden earned his IFBB Pro card by winning the 2009 North American Championships. He was the 11th at the 2011 Mr. Olympia (Mr. Olympia debut), 3rd at the 2012 Mr. Olympia, and 4th at the 2013 Mr. Olympia competition. In 2014, Rhoden was third at the 2014 Mr. Olympia competition and then third again at the 2015 Mr. Olympia. In 2016, he was second. Two years later, he unseated Phil Heath to become the 2018 Mr. Olympia. Rhoden's age at the time, 43 years and 5 months, made him the oldest Mr. Olympia titleholder.

== Personal life and death ==
In 2015, Shawn Rhoden and then partner Michelle Richardson had a daughter. However, due to personal issues and allegations of infidelity, Michelle and Shawn separated in 2018. Rhoden died from a heart attack on November 6, 2021 at 46 years old.

== Legal trouble ==
Rhoden was accused of sexually assaulting a woman while he was visiting Salt Lake City, Utah, in October 2018, shortly after his Mr. Olympia win. In July 2019, he was formally charged in the state of Utah with rape, object rape, and sexual abuse. It was alleged that Rhoden invited a married woman whom he had been mentoring to his hotel room in Salt Lake, where the reported actions took place. The American Media LLC company, which is the organizing body for the Mr. Olympia contest, released a statement in July 2019 that Rhoden was banned from competing at the 2019 Mr. Olympia contest, as well as future competitions. A statement that same month from the governing body of the sport of bodybuilding and fitness, the IFBB Pro (through representative Jim Manion), stated that the IFBB Pro League had thus far not taken any action regarding Rhoden, but would continue to monitor the situation.

== Competition history ==
Amateur

- 2009 IFBB North American Championships – 1st
- 2009 NPC Delaware Open Bodybuilding – 1st
- 2001 NPC Team Universe Championships – 2nd
- 2000 NPC Team Universe Championships – 4th
- 1999 NPC Team Universe Championships – 3rd

Professional

- 2018 Mr. Olympia – 1st
- 2017 Mr. Olympia – 5th
- 2016 Mr. Olympia – 2nd
- 2016 Kuwait Pro Men's Bodybuilding – 3rd place
- 2015 EVL's Prague Pro – 3rd
- 2015 Mr. Olympia – 3rd
- 2014 IFBB San Marino Pro – 1st
- 2014 EVL's Prague Pro – 3rd
- 2014 Dubai Pro – 2nd
- 2014 IFBB Arnold Classic Europe – 2nd
- 2014 Mr. Olympia – 3rd
- 2014 IFBB Australian Pro – 1st
- 2014 IFBB Arnold Classic – 2nd
- 2013 IFBB Arnold Classic Europe – 4th
- 2013 Mr. Olympia – 4th
- 2012 IFBB EVL's Prague Pro – 2nd
- 2012 IFBB British Grand Prix – 1st
- 2012 IFBB Arnold Classic Europe – 1st
- 2012 Mr. Olympia – 3rd
- 2012 IFBB Dallas Europa Supershow – 1st
- 2012 IFBB PBW Tampa Pro – 1st
- 2012 NPC Dexter Jackson Classic – NP
- 2012 IFBB Arnold Classic – 8th
- 2012 IFBB FLEX Pro – 4th
- 2011 Mr. Olympia – 11th
- 2011 IFBB Dallas Europa Super Show – 3rd
- 2010 IFBB Dallas Europa Super Show – 6th

Mr. Olympia
Preceded by: Phil Heath	First (2018)	Succeeded by: Brandon Curry
Records
Previous: Chris Dickerson; 43 yrs., 2 mos.	Oldest champion 43 yrs. 5 mos. since 2018	Incumbent
