= 1971 Mr. Olympia =

Professional bodybuilding competition

The 1971 Mr. Olympia contest was an IFBB professional bodybuilding competition held September 25, 1971 at the Maison de la Mutualité in Paris, France. It was the 7th Mr. Olympia competition held.

The competition was a disappointment to many because three of its four competitors were disqualified before the event, leaving Arnold Schwarzenegger to win the contest unopposed. It was the first time the IFBB barred contestants from any of its events. The IFBB's effort to get bodybuilding represented in the 1976 Olympics required the organization enforce its constitution to give it parity with other official international athletic organizations. Sergio Oliva was disqualified from entering the Mr. Olympia because he competed in an unsanctioned contest (NABBA Mr. Universe). Roy Callender and Franco Columbu were disqualified from the IFBB Mr. Universe (held concurrently with the Olympia) for also entering unsanctioned contests. "If bodybuilding is to become an Olympic Games event it must have an amateur division and it must have rules and regulations specifying who is eligible or not to compete in amateur and professional categories," insisted IFBB President Ben Weider in the keynote speech opening the contest.

== Results ==
| Place | Prize | Name |
|---|---|---|
| | $1,000 | (Austria) Arnold Schwarzenegger |
| DQ | | (Cuba) Sergio Oliva |

== Notable events ==
- Arnold Schwarzenegger won his second consecutive Mr. Olympia title
- Franco Columbu and Sergio Oliva were permitted to pose for the crowd for exhibition in spite of their disqualifications
