= Branch Warren =

American bodybuilder (born 1975)

- Professional bodybuilder
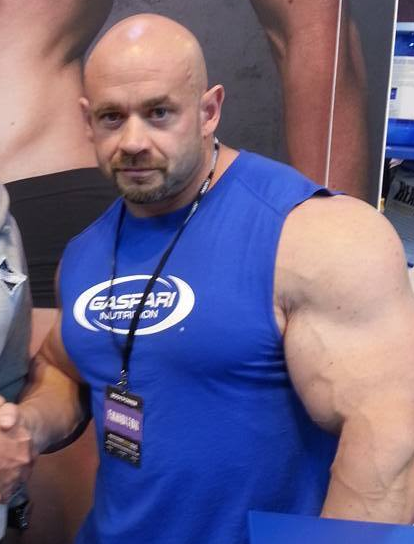
- Warren in 2011

Personal info
- Born: February 28, 1975 (age 51); Tyler, Texas, U.S.

Best statistics
- Height: 5 ft 6 in (168 cm)
- Weight: 245 lb (111 kg)

Professional (Pro) career
- Best win: Arnold Classic; 2011–2012
- Active: 1992–2015

Branch Warren is an American retired IFBB Pro League professional bodybuilder.

== Early life ==
Warren was born in Tyler, Texas. He grew up on a cattle ranch and later moved to Fort Worth, Texas.

== Career ==
Warren placed second at the 2009 Mr. Olympia, the closest he came to winning the competition. His best wins came when he won both the 2011 and 2012 Arnold Classic competitions. He was previously sponsored by MuscleTech and Gaspari Nutrition. He often trains with Johnnie Jackson at the Metroflex Gym in Arlington, Texas, having also trained with Janae Kroc. He retired in 2015, and is now the founder and owner of a beef jerky company called Wicked Cutz Jerky.

== Personal life ==
Warren is married to a fellow bodybuilder named Trish. Their daughter, Faith Lea, was born on February 6, 2012.

== Bodybuilding competitions ==
- 1992 AAU Teenage Mr. America, Short and Overall - 1st
- 1993 NPC Teenage Nationals, Lightheavyweight and Overall - 1st
- 2001 NPC Nationals, Heavyweight - 1st
- 2005 Charlotte Pro - 1st
- 2005 Europa Supershow - 1st
- 2005 Mr. Olympia - 8th
- 2006 Mr. Olympia - 12th
- 2007 New York Pro - 1st
- 2009 Mr. Olympia - 2nd
- 2010 Mr. Olympia - 3rd
- 2011 Arnold Classic - 1st
- 2011 British Grand Prx - 1st
- 2012 Arnold Classic - 1st
- 2012 Australian Grand Prix - 1st
- 2012 Mr. Olympia - 5th
- 2013 Mr. Olympia - 9th
- 2014 Dallas Europa - 1st
- 2014 Australian Pro - 4th
- 2014 Mr. Olympia - 6th
- 2015 Arnold Classic - 2nd
- 2015 Arnold classic Australia - 2nd
- 2015 Europa Atlantic City Pro - 1st
- 2015 Mr. Olympia - 6th

== See also ==
- List of male professional bodybuilders
