= Ryderwear =

Australian fitness apparel company

- Industry: Apparel; Accessories; Sports equipment Athleisure
- Founded: 2009; 17 years ago
- Founder: David Lukic and Natalie Lukic
- Headquarters: Lonsdale, South Australia, Australia
- Products: Sportswear; Fitness fashion
- Number of employees: 300 (2015)
- Website: au.ryderwear.com

Ryderwear is an Australian fitness apparel and accessories brand, manufacturer and retailer headquartered in South Australia. Ryderwear tied up with the bodybuilder Big Ramy.

== History ==
Ryderwear was founded by David Lukic and his now-wife Natalie Lukic in 2009.

== See also ==
- List of South Australian manufacturing businesses
