= Víctor Martínez (bodybuilder) =

American bodybuilder

- ♂ Professional bodybuilder

Personal info
- Nickname: Dominican Dominator
- Born: July 29, 1973 (age 53); San Francisco de Macorís, Dominican Republic

Best statistics
- Biceps: 52 cm (20 in)
- Calves: 48 cm (19 in)
- Chest: 150 cm (59 in)
- Contest weight: 109–111 kg (240–245 lb)
- Forearm: 40 cm (16 in)
- Height: 175 cm (5 ft 9 in)
- Off-season weight: 265–275 lb (120–125 kg)
- Thighs: 76 cm (30 in)
- Waist: 86 cm (34 in)

Professional (Pro) career
- Pro-debut: IFBB Night of Champions; 2001
- Best win: IFBB Arnold Classic Champion; 2007
- Predecessors: Jay Cutler
- Successor: Dexter Jackson
- Pro years: 1994-2021

Víctor Martínez (born July 29, 1973) is a retired International Federation of BodyBuilders (IFBB) professional bodybuilder, and the second Dominican bodybuilder to turn professional (the first being Tony Domenench from Puerto Plata, who turned pro in 1995). His career highlights were winning the Arnold Classic in 2007 and finishing runner-up at the 2007 Mr. Olympia. He signed a contract for a sponsorship deal with Maximum Human Performance which also sponsors Michael Kefalianos.

== Biography ==
Martínez's career was launched when he competed in the 1997 National Physique Committee (NPC) New York Metro Championships as a light heavyweight, where he placed first. He continued competing in NPC tournaments until 2001, where he competed in his first IFBB tournament, the Night of Champions, where he placed 8th. The following year, in 2002, he competed in his first Arnold Classic, and placed 13th. He also competed in his first Ironman Pro Invitational the same year, placing 9th. In 2003 he went on to win the Night of Champions.

His first Mr. Olympia came in 2004, where he placed 9th, but he advanced to 5th place in 2005, 3rd place in 2006, and 2nd place in 2007 In 2005 Ronnie Coleman predicted that Martínez would be his successor as Mr. Olympia, although this position was held by Jay Cutler (2006, 2007), then Dexter Jackson (2008).

In 2007, Martínez took first at the Arnold Classic. Martínez later finished second to Jay Cutler at the 2007 Mr. Olympia contest.

In January 2008, Martínez underwent surgery to repair his left patellar tendon which ruptured while he was performing warm-up lunges. Due to the severity of the injury, he was unable to compete in either the 2008 Arnold Classic or 2008 Mr. Olympia contests. After almost a year away from training and competition, Victor Martinez resumed training with his old friend and strength & condition coach Jakob Panotas. During their 9 months of hardcore training and rehabbing his knee, he came strong and placed 2nd at 2009 Arnold Classic in Columbus Ohio by only 2-3 points behind 1st place Kai Greene.

In 2018, Víctor Martínez collaborated with the NPC Northeast Amateur division to create the "Víctor Martínez Legends" championship.

Martínez was co-owner of the Muscle Maker Grill in Edgewater NJ and is the spokesperson for the franchise as a whole. He lost the business due to being incarcerated for more than six weeks for immigration violations. He was arrested on returning to the U.S. on October 9, 2011, after winning the Arnold Europe in Madrid, Spain. His permanent resident card had expired and, due to his criminal record for selling steroids in 2004, it was not renewed. Instead, he was sent to a detention center in New Jersey to await a deportation hearing that could have sent him back to his native Dominican Republic. He was denied bail. A few of the documents were not in order, and his final hearing was postponed until April 2012. He was held at the Hudson County Correctional Facility in South Kearny, New Jersey. On April 27, he returned to court and was released from jail and permitted to remain in the U.S.

Martinez competed in the 2020 Arnold Classic taking 9th place. He announced his retirement soon after at the age of 47. Martinez still holds his sponsorship with MHP.

Martínez has two sons, Justin and Jared, and four daughters, Victoria, Zayde, Vivian, and Zoe. Three of his daughters come from a second marriage. He resides in Edgewater, New Jersey.

== Stats ==
- Height: 1.75 m (5 ft 9 in)
- Contest weight: 109–111 kg (240–245 lb)
- Off-season weight: 120–125 kg (265–276 lb)
- Arms: 52 cm (20 in)
- Chest: 150 cm (59 in)
- Waist: 86 cm (34 in)
- Thighs: 76 cm (30 in)
- Calves: 48 cm (19 in)
- Forearms: 40 cm (16 in)

== Contest history ==
=== Amateur career ===
- 1993 Elmo's Gym, Teenage, 1st
- 1994 NPC Bev Francis Atlantic States, 27th
- 1997 NPC New Jersey Suburban State Bodybuilding Contest, Light-Heavyweight, 1st and Overall
- 1997 NPC New York Metropolitan Championships, Light-Heavyweight, 1st and Overall
- 1999 NPC Bev Francis Atlantic States, 16th
- 2000 NPC Junior USA, Heavyweight, 1st
- 2000 NPC Nationals, Heavyweight, 1st and Overall (pro card)

=== Pro career ===
- 2001 IFBB Night of Champions, 8th
- 2002 IFBB Arnold Classic, 13th
- 2002 IFBB Ironman Pro Invitational, 9th
- 2003 IFBB Night of Champions, 1st
- 2004 IFBB Mr. Olympia, 9th
- 2004 IFBB GNC Show of Strength Pro Championship, 1st
- 2005 IFBB Arnold Classic, 7th
- 2005 IFBB New York Pro Championship, 3rd
- 2005 IFBB Mr. Olympia, 5th
- 2005 IFBB San Francisco Pro Invitational, 5th
- 2006 IFBB Arnold Classic, 3rd
- 2006 IFBB Mr. Olympia, 3rd
- 2007 IFBB Arnold Classic, 1st
- 2007 IFBB Mr. Olympia, 2nd
- 2009 IFBB Arnold Classic, 2nd
- 2009 IFBB Mr. Olympia, 6th
- 2010 IFBB Mr. Olympia, 8th
- 2011 IFBB Arnold Classic, 3rd
- 2011 IFBB Mr. Olympia, 4th
- 2011 IFBB Arnold Classic Madrid, 1st
- 2013 IFBB New York Pro Championship, 2nd
- 2013 IFBB Toronto Pro Supershow, 1st
- 2013 IFBB Mr. Olympia, 11th
- 2013 IFBB Arnold Classic Madrid, 5th
- 2014 IFBB Tampa Pro, 1st
- 2014 IFBB Mr. Olympia, 8th
- 2014 IFBB Arnold Classic, 4th
- 2014 IFBB Prague Pro, 7th
- 2014 IFBB SAN Marino Pro, 4th
- 2015 IFBB Mr. Olympia, 9th
- 2015 IFBB New York Pro Championship, 2nd
- 2016 IFBB Baltimore Pro, 1st
- 2016 IFBB Mr. Olympia, 11th
- 2016 IFBB Elite Pro (formerly IFBB) Arnold Classic South Africa, 4th
- 2017 IFBB Muscle Mayhem, 1st
- 2017 IFBB Elite Pro (formerly IFBB) Arnold Classic South Africa, 4th
- 2017 IFBB Arnold Classic Europe, 8th
- 2019 IFBB Arnold Classic, 10th
- 2020 IFBB Arnold Classic, 9th

== Sponsorship history ==
- Maximum Human Performance (2005-2020)
- Muscular Development magazine
- Muscle Meds
- Eva’s New York City
- Generation Iron (2020-2021)
- Superhero Labs - co owner (2020-2021)
- Panatta (2021–present)
- Victor Martinez Signature Series - owner (established 2022)

== See also ==
- Arnold Classic
- List of male professional bodybuilders
- Mr. Olympia
