= Robert Piotrkowicz =

Polish bodybuilder and powerlifter

- Professional bodybuilder

Personal info
- Nickname: "White Eagle"
- Born: 17 January 1974 (age 52); Warsaw, Poland

Best statistics
- Height: 5 ft 9 in (175 cm)
- Weight: Contest: 250 lb (113 kg), Off season: 290 lb (132 kg)

Professional (Pro) career
- Pro-debut: World Amateur Champion; 2007
- Active: Yes

Competition record

Powerlifting

Polish Champion
1st	1995

Robert "Terminator" Piotrkowicz (born 17 January 1974 in Warsaw), also nicknamed the "White Eagle", is an IFBB professional bodybuilder and powerlifter from Poland. He is only the second Mr. Olympia contestant to represent Poland in history. The first being Miroslaw Daszkiewicz. And the only one to have represented Poland twice (2010 and 2011). Since receiving his membership card in the IFBB in 2007, he is currently the only Polish bodybuilder recognized by the Federation. He is a Polish powerlifting champion and karate practitioner.

== Biography ==
Trained as an engineer, he is a graduate of Warsaw University of Technology Faculty of Electrical Engineering. Currently he is the only Polish bodybuilder who possesses the most prestigious pro bodybuilding federation, the International Federation of Bodybuilders Pro card which he received on 15 July 2009. 2011 was his most active year in bodybuilding, as he entered 9 contests in that year.

He is married and has a daughter named Ola. He owns a fitness club, "Body Fan," located in Ząbki, which he runs together with his wife, Joanna. She writes articles for several industry magazines including Iron Man Spain, Bodybuilding and Fitness, Sport for All and Muscular Development. His first coach was another well-known Polish bodybuilder Peter Głuchowski. In 2013, he beat Toney Freeman and Ronny Rockel to become the Mr. Europe 2013.

== Stats ==
- Height : 5 ft 9 in (175 cm)
- Contest Weight : 250 pounds (113 kg)
- Off-season weight : 290 pounds (132 kg)
- Chest :140 cm (55 in) to 148 cm (58 in)
- Upper Arm : 51 cm (20 in) to 54 cm (21 in)
- Forearm : 45 cm (18 in) to 47 cm (19 in)
- Waist : 75 cm (30 in) to 84 cm (33 in)
- Thigh : 74 cm (29 in) to 82 cm (32 in)
- Calf : 46 cm (18 in) to 50 cm (20 in)

== Powerlifting records ==
- Bench press: 250 kg 1RM
- Barbell squat: 300 kg 1RM
- Deadlift: 320 kg 1RM

== Pro career ==
- 2009: IFBB Tampa Pro - 15 place
- 2009: IFBB Europa Supershow - 5 place
- 2009: IFBB Atlantic City Pro - 6 place
- 2009: IFBB Sacramento Pro - 3 place (the first qualification for Mr. Olympia)
- 2010: IFBB Arnold Classic Pro - 10 place
- 2010: IFBB Mr. Europe Pro - 4 place
- 2010: IFBB Mr. Olympia - 18 place
- 2011: IFBB Arnold Classic Pro - 14 place
- 2011: IFBB Mr. Europe Pro - 4 place
- 2011: IFBB FIBO Power Pro Germany - 6 place
- 2011: IFBB Europa Show of Champions - 7 place
- 2011: IFBB Toronto Pro Supershow - 5 place
- 2011: IFBB Tampa Bay Pro - 6 place
- 2011: IFBB Phoenix Pro - 6 place
- 2011: IFBB Tijuana Pro - 3 place (the second qualification for Mr. Olympia)
- 2011: IFBB Mr. Olympia - 16 place
- 2011: IFBB Arnold Classic Europe Pro - 7 place
- 2012: IFBB Nordic Pro Championships - 2 place
- 2012: IFBB Arnold Classic Europe - 4 place
- 2013: IFBB Mr. Europe Pro - 1 place
- 2013 IFBB Mr. Olympia - 16
- 2013 IFBB Prague Pro 8th
- 2014 IFBB Arnold Classic Brazil 11th
- 2014 IFBB Arnold Classic Europe 8th
- 2014 IFBB San Marino Pro 8th
- 2014 IFBB Nordic Pro 5th
- 2015 IFBB Nordic Pro - 5th place
