= Essa Obaid (bodybuilder) =

Emirati bodybuilder

- professional bodybuilder
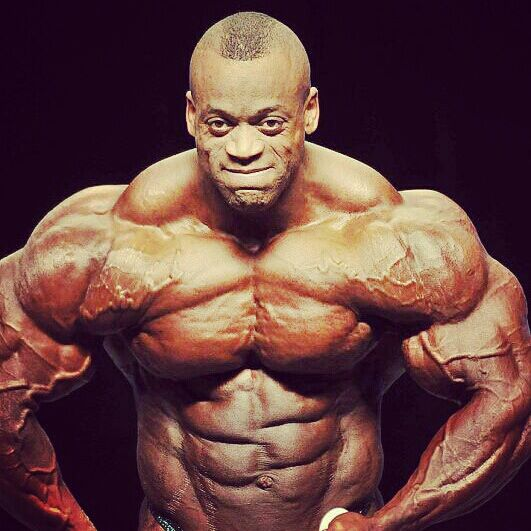
- Essa Obaid at Mr Olympia 2012.

Personal info
- Born: September 27, 1979 (age 45); Dubai, United Arab Emirates

Best statistics
- Height: 5 ft 9 in (1.75 m)
- Weight: 250 lb (110 kg)

Professional (Pro) career
- Best win: 2010 Arnold Amateur – 2010 IFBB Europa Championships - 2012 Wings of Strength Chicago Pro; 2010–2012

Essa Obaid (Arabic: عيسى عبيد, born September 27, 1979, in Dubai, United Arab Emirates) is an IFBB professional bodybuilder. Essa was first person from the Persian Gulf region to participate in the Mr. Olympia competition in bodybuilding. As of September 18, 2015, Essa is officially sponsored by BPI Sports in the Mr. Olympia 2015 competition.

== Stats ==
- Height: 5 ft 9in
- Weight: 250 lbs

== Sponsors ==
Essa is sponsored by Hamdan bin Mohammed Al Maktoum Crown Prince of Dubai.

== Contest history ==
- 2001 World Arab Championships (Egypt) - 2nd Heavyweight
- 2001 Abu Dhabi Championships (UAE) - Winner Heavyweight Teen & Open Men
- 2003 Fujairah Classic (UAE) - Winner Heavyweight
- 2004 World Arab Championships (Morocco) - 2nd Heavyweight
- 2007 Al Ain Classic (UAE) - Winner Super Heavyweight
- 2008 Hammer Gym Classic (Oman) - Winner Super Heavyweight
- 2010 Arnold Amateur (USA) - Overall Winner and IFBB Pro Card
- 2010 IFBB Europa Championships - Winner
- 2011 IFBB Arnold Classic - 13th
- 2011 IFBB British Grand Prix - 7th
- 2011 IFBB Mr Europe Grand Prix - 6th
- 2011 IFBB FIBO Pro - 8th
- 2012 Europa Battle of Champions - 3rd
- 2012 Wings of Strength Chicago Pro - Winner
- 2012 Mr. Olympia – 14th
- 2013 IFBB Wings of Strength Chicago - 4th
- 2013 IFBB PBW Tampa Pro - 3rd
- 2013 IFBB Dallas Europa Supershow - 2nd
- 2013 Mr. Olympia – 16th
- 2015 Mr.Olympia - 10th
