= Flex Lewis =

Welsh bodybuilder (born 1983)

James Lewis
- ♂ Professional bodybuilder

Personal info
- Nickname: Flex
- Born: 15 November 1983 (age 42); Llanelli, Wales

Best statistics
- Contest weight: 212 lb (96 kg)
- Height: 5 ft 5 in (1.65 m)
- Off-season weight: 238 lb (108 kg)

Professional (Pro) career
- Pro-debut: Europa Supershow; 2008
- Best win: 212 Mr. Olympia, seven times
- Pro years: 2008-2022

James "Flex" Lewis (born 15 November 1983) is a Welsh former bodybuilder and has won 7 consecutive 212 Mr. Olympia titles. On 12 May 2022 he announced his retirement from competitive bodybuilding. He lives in Las Vegas, Nevada.

== Early life ==
Lewis' interest in bodybuilding began at the age of 12 after discovering a book on Tom Platz. It was Platz's legs, he claims, that inspired Lewis to join a gym and start bodybuilding. Arnold Schwarzenegger was one of Lewis' biggest idols as a child.

One day, when Lewis was home alone, he had scouted his father's shed and came across plastic weights, that his parents wouldn't allow him to use. Despite his parents' prohibition, Lewis would take the weights and hide them under his bed, performing various exercises every night with them, before his parents found out and took them back. This was his introduction to weight training.

At the age of 15 Lewis stepped into a gym for the first time. He had played rugby at a high school level and he needed to gain some size for the sport. After coming across a local bodybuilder by the name of Steve Naylor, he was told that his physique had great potential. He took heed in the advice and trained with Naylor for a year, before he entered his first bodybuilding competition, the Junior Mr. Wales, which he promptly won.

Lewis had a tattoo printed on his left arm at the age of 15, which he claims had stretched and morphed itself completely around his arm as they grew in size. Rugby also introduced Flex to weight training for increasing super power and he consequently has the ability to lift an enormous weight and hold it for long periods of time.

== Contest history ==
2018 Mr Olympia - 212 - 1st

2017 Mr Olympia - 212 - 1st

2016 Mr Olympia - 212 - 1st

2015 Mr Olympia - 212 - 1st

2014 IFBB San Marino Pro - 212 - 1st

2014 EVL's Prague Pro - 212 - 1st

2014 IFBB Korea Grand Prix - 212 - 1st

2014 Mr Olympia - 212 - 1st

2014 IFBB Arnold Classic - 212 - 1st

2013 EVL's Prague Pro - 212 - 1st

2013 Mr Olympia - 212 - 1st

2012 EVL's Prague Pro - 212 - 1st

2012 British Grand Prix - 212 - 1st

2012 Mr Olympia - 212 - 1st

2011 Arnold Classic Europe - 5th

2011 Mr Olympia - 202 - 2nd

2011 New York Pro Championships - 202 - 2nd

2011 Mr Europe Grand Prix - Open - 3rd

2011 IFBB British Grand Prix - 202 - 1st

2009 IFBB Atlantic City Pro - 202 - 1st

2009 Mr Olympia - 202 - 5th

2008 Europa Pro - Overall - 7th

2008 Europa Pro - 202 - 1st

2008 Tampa Pro - Open - 7th

Amateur Competition History:

2007 British Nationals (Earned Pro Card) - Overall - 1st

2006 Mr Wales - Overall - 1st

2006 Mr Britain - U90 - 1st

2004 NABBA Mr Universe - 1st

2004 EFBB Jr Mr Britain - 1st

2004 EFBB Jr Mr Wales - 1st

2004 NABBA Mr Europe - 1st

2004 NABBA Jr Mr Britain - 1st

2004 NABBA Mr Wales - 1st

2003 EFBB Jr Mr Britain - 1st

2003 EFBB Novice Mr Wales - 1st

2003 EFBB Jr Mr Wales - 1st

== Awards and honors ==
At the 2014 Arnold Classic he became the first man to be presented as winner of the 212 class. In 2011, Lewis placed third in the IFBB Mr. Europe pro mens. He holds the record of holding the most 212 class wins at the Mr. Olympia with 7 total wins.
