= Serge Nubret =

Guadeloupean bodybuilder (1938–2011)

- Historical photo of Nubret
- Born: 6 October 1938; Anse-Bertrand, Guadeloupe
- Died: 19 April 2011 (aged 72); Paris, France
- Other name: The Black Panther
- Height: 1.78 m (5 ft 10 in)

Serge Nubret (6 October 1938 – 19 April 2011) was a Guadeloupean-French professional bodybuilder, actor and self-published author. He won numerous bodybuilding competitions, including the 1976 NABBA Mr. Universe (1976). Nubret was nicknamed "the Black Panther."

== Early life ==
Nubret was born on 6 October 1938 in Anse-Bertrand, Guadeloupe. Nubret has credited Steve Reeves as his childhood inspiration.

== Career ==
In 1960, Nubret joined the International Federation of Bodybuilders and was declared World's Most Muscular Man in Montreal. Nubret kept improving, winning titles including NABBA Mr. Universe in 1976 (London), WBBG Pro. Mr. World and Mr. Olympus in 1977 (New York) and another World champion title in 1981 (Geneva). In 1983, 23 years after his first world-class achievement he became the WABBA World Champion in Rome, winning his fifth major title. At 65 years old, Nubret offered a last show to his public during the 2003 World championships in France.

In addition to being recognized by experts, peers, and fans as a reference in the bodybuilding field, Nubret also dedicated himself to the development and promotion of bodybuilding. He became the head of the French and European IFBB bodybuilding federations from 1970 to 1975. In 1975, he founded the World Amateur Body Building Association (WABBA) to host amateur bodybuilding competitions. Serge Nubret would appear in several minor film projects during his career. Nubret was also featured in the 1977 documentary, Pumping Iron, about Arnold Schwarzenegger.

== Author ==
In 2006, the 68-year-old Nubret penned an autobiography Je suis...Moi &Dieu (I am...Me and God) in collaboration with Louis-Xavier Babin-Lachaud. The book which only exists in French tells his life story and his Christian beliefs.

== Personal life ==
Nubret was father to three daughters (Pascale, Karine, and Grace) and a son (Stanley) from two marriages and one relationship. His second marriage was with Jacqueline Nubret, a female bodybuilder with various competition titles.

In March 2009, Nubret fell into a coma. Rumors of him having been poisoned started to spread and his family published a statement refuting those allegations:

"On March 19, 2009, our father was discovered home, in a coma by firemen. He was immediately transferred to the Lariboisiere hospital. Since that, Serge Nubret is under the supervision of the hospital’s medical staff. For now, the diagnosis is a hypoglycemic coma probably due to a malfunction of the pancreas. The explorations continues while Serge Nubret is in rehabilitation. We will keep you informed of any change in its health state"

Such rumors were never substantiated but online forums and magazines continued to speculate regarding the cause of his coma and subsequent death. Nubret remained in a coma for the next two years, dying in April 2011.

== List of bodybuilding titles ==
A list of notable titles won by Serge throughout his career include:

- 1958 Mr. Guadeloupe
- 1960 Ifbb World Most Muscular Man
- 1970 Ifbb Mr. Europe (Tall)
- 1975 IFBB Mr. Olympia, 2nd.
- 1976 Nabba Pro Mr. Universe
- 1977 Wbbg Mr. Olympus
- 1977 Wbbg Pro Mr. World
- 1981 Pro Wabba World Championships
- 1983 Pro Wabba World Championships

In addition, Serge also competed in the 1972, 1973 and 1975

== Filmography ==
- My Son, the Hero (1962) (co-starring Giuliano Gemma) - Rator
- Goliath and the Rebel Slave (1963) (co-starring Gordon Scott) - Milan
- Un gosse de la butte (1964) (co-starring René Lefèvre) - Vincent
- 13 Days to Die (1965) - Pongo
- Les Aventures de Tom Sawyer (1968, TV miniseries) - Jim
- The Seven Red Berets (1969) (co-starring Kirk Morris) - Martinez
- The Cop (1970) - Le Noir
- César and Rosalie (1972) (co-starring Yves Montand) - Un acheteur de métaux
- Impossible... pas français (1974)
- Les demoiselles à péage (1975) - Boulou
- Pumping Iron (1977, Documentary, co-starring Arnold Schwarzenegger and Lou Ferrigno)
- La part du feu (1978)
- Nous maigrirons ensemble (1979) - Le body-builder club de gym
- Breakfast Included (1980, TV Mini-Series) - Sissou Lemarchand
- The Professional (1981) (co-starring Jean-Paul Belmondo) - L'infirmier au procès
- Série Noire (1984, TV Series) - Pierrot
- Sins (1986, TV Mini-Series) - Masseur (final appearance)

== See also ==
- List of female professional bodybuilders
- List of male professional bodybuilders
- Pumping Iron
