= Dexter Jackson (bodybuilder) =

American bodybuilder (born 1969)

- Professional bodybuilder
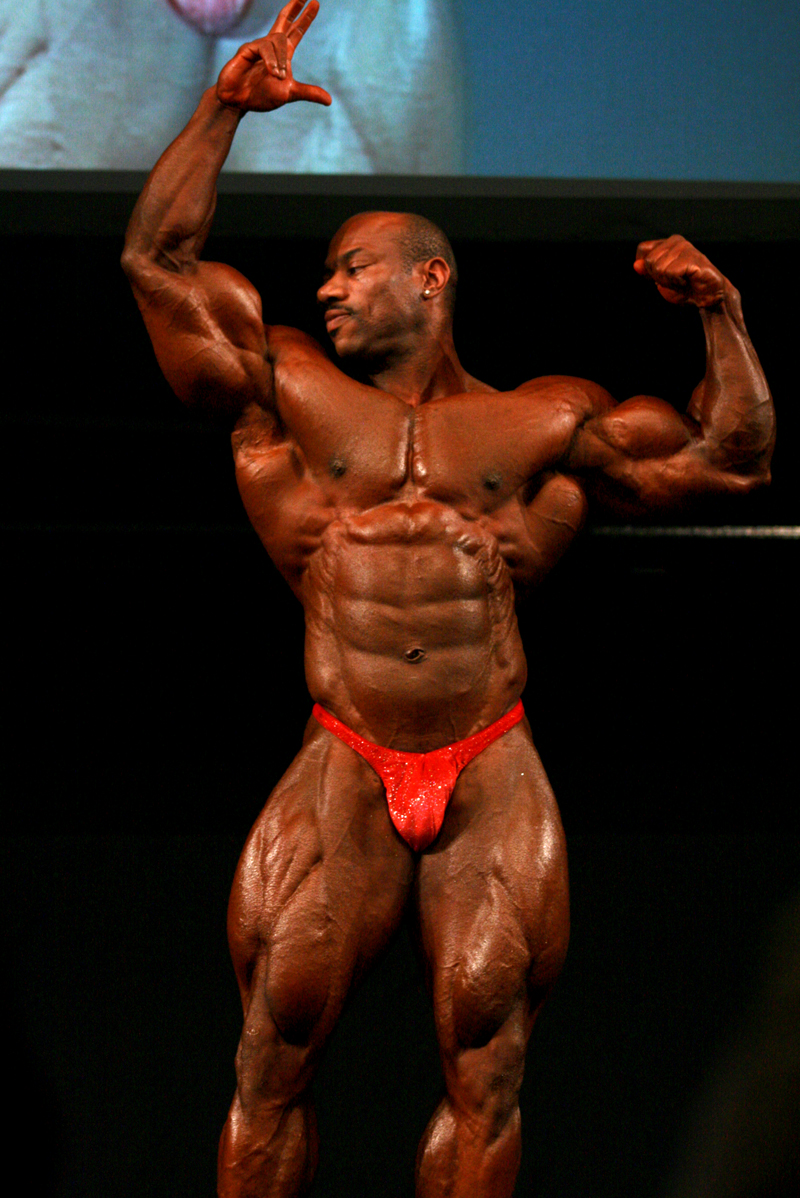
- Jackson at the 2008 IFBB Australian Pro Grand Prix VIII

Personal info
- Nickname: The Blade, DJ
- Born: November 25, 1969 (age 56); Jacksonville, Florida, U.S.

Best statistics
- Height: 5 ft 5 in (1.65 m)
- Weight: Contest: 215 lb (98 kg); Off season: 230–235 lb (104–107 kg)

Professional (Pro) career
- Pro-debut: Arnold Classic; 1999
- Best win: Mr. Olympia; 2008, Masters Mr. Olympia 2012
- Active: 1992–2020

Dexter "The Blade" Jackson (born November 25, 1969) is an American retired IFBB Pro League professional bodybuilder and the 2008 Mr. Olympia bodybuilding and 2012 Masters Mr. Olympia champion. With 29 wins, Jackson has the most professional men's bodybuilding titles. He has the distinction of winning the Arnold Classic a record five times (2005, 2006, 2008, 2013, 2015). After winning the Arnold Classic in 2015, he placed second in the 2015 Mr. Olympia. He is from Jacksonville, Florida. He retired from professional bodybuilding following the 2020 Mr. Olympia.

== Biography ==
Jackson's first NPC (National Physique Committee) competition was the NPC Southern States Championship of 1992, where he took 3rd. He first competed professionally in the 1999 Arnold Classic, Night of Champions, and Mr. Olympia contests, placing 7th, 3rd, and 9th, respectively.

At the 2007 Mr. Olympia, Jackson placed third. On September 27, 2008, he defeated reigning champion Jay Cutler to become the 12th man to win the title and only the second man since Ronnie Coleman to win both Mr. Olympia and Arnold Classic title in the same calendar year..

In 2008 Jackson won the Arnold Classic, Australian Pro Grand Prix VIII, New Zealand Grand Prix, Russian Grand Prix and Mr. Olympia. He placed 3rd in the 2009 Mr. Olympia contest.

In 2012, Jackson placed 4th in Mr. Olympia then surprised everyone by winning that year's Masters Olympia at the age of 43. He won his fourth Arnold Classic title in 2013.

In 2015, Jackson he placed 2nd at the Mr. Olympia, his highest placing since winning the Mr. Olympia in 2008.

In 2020, Jackson announced that he will compete at the Mr. Olympia and this will be his final show after competing professionally since 1999. He placed 9th at that show, the same placing as his Olympia debut in 1999.

Jackson has been featured in many fitness and bodybuilding articles, including being pictured on the cover of Muscular Development and Flex magazine. He shot his new documentary DVD, Dexter Jackson: Unbreakable with filmmaker Alex Ardenti of Ardenti Films, in Florida and California. It was released in 2009.

== Distinctions ==
- Jackson has made a record-setting 21 Mr. Olympia appearances.
- Jackson is the only bodybuilder to win the overall title in both the Mr. Olympia and Masters Olympia bodybuilding competitions.
- Jackson has won the original Arnold Classic five times (2005, 2006, 2008, 2013, 2015), more than any other bodybuilder.
- Jackson is one of only seven bodybuilders to have won both the Mr. Olympia and Arnold Classic titles. The other 6 are Ronnie Coleman, Jay Cutler, Brandon Curry, Hadi Choopan, Samson Dauda, Derek Lunsford.
- Jackson is the fifth oldest bodybuilder (second oldest male bodybuilder) ever to win an open IFBB pro show at the age of 49 years 8 months and 9 days after Yaxeni Oriquen-Garcia at the age of 49 years 10 months and 13 days, Lisa Aukland at the age of 50 years, 11 months and 27 days, Betty Pariso at the age of 53 years, 6 months and 10 days, and Albert Beckles at the age of 60 years, 9 months and 13 days.

== Business ventures ==
In 2009, following his win at the 2008 Mr. Olympia, Jackson created his own bodybuilding competition, The Dexter Classic.

In early 2021, just following his retirement, Jackson announced he would be launching his own line of products. It will contain a full line of 27 supplements. Jackson stated he had been planning this venture since his departure from Ultimate Nutrition in 2015.

== Physical stats ==
- Height: 5 ft 5 in (165 cm)
- Contest Weight: 215 pounds (98 kg)
- Off Season Weight: 235 pounds (107 kg)
- Chest: 52" (132 cm)
- Arms: 20" (50 cm)

== Contest history ==
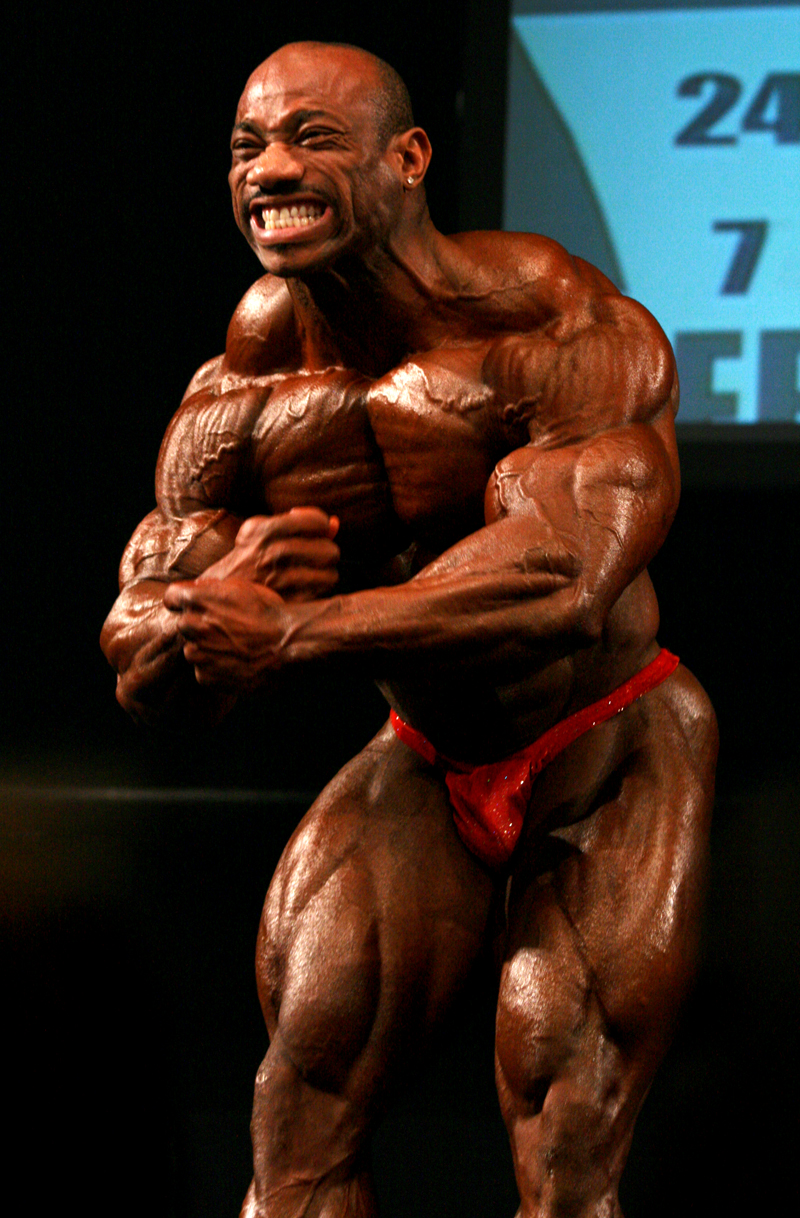
Dexter Jackson at 2008 IFBB Australian Pro Grand Prix VIII.

- 1992 NPC Southern States, Lightweight, 3rd
- 1995 NPC USA Championships, Light-Heavyweight, 1st
- 1996 NPC Nationals, Light-Heavyweight, 6th
- 1998 North American Championships, Light-HeavyWeight, 1st and Overall
- 1999 Arnold Classic, 7th
- 1999 Grand Prix England, 4th
- 1999 Night of Champions, 3rd
- 1999 Mr. Olympia, 9th
- 1999 World Pro Championships, 4th
- 2000 Arnold Classic, 5th
- 2000 Grand Prix Hungary, 2nd
- 2000 Ironman Pro Invitational, 3rd
- 2000 Night of Champions, 8th
- 2000 Mr. Olympia, 9th
- 2000 Toronto Pro Invitational, 2nd
- 2001 Arnold Classic, 5th
- 2001 Grand Prix Australia, 3rd
- 2001 Grand Prix England, 4th
- 2001 Grand Prix Hungary, 3rd
- 2001 Night of Champions, 2nd
- 2001 Mr. Olympia, 8th
- 2001 Toronto Pro Invitational, 2nd
- 2002 Arnold Classic, 3rd
- 2002 Grand Prix Australia, 2nd
- 2002 Grand Prix Austria, 2nd
- 2002 Grand Prix England, 1st
- 2002 Grand Prix Holland, 3rd
- 2002 Mr. Olympia, 4th
- 2002 San Francisco Pro Invitational, 3rd
- 2002 Show of Strength Pro Championship, 6th
- 2003 Arnold Classic, 4th
- 2003 Maximum Pro Invitational, 3rd
- 2003 Mr. Olympia, 3rd
- 2003 San Francisco Pro Invitational, 3rd
- 2003 Show of Strength Pro Championship, 1st
- 2004 Arnold Classic, 3rd
- 2004 Grand Prix Australia, 1st
- 2004 Ironman Pro Invitational, 1st
- 2004 Mr. Olympia, 4th
- 2004 San Francisco Pro Invitational, 1st
- 2005 Arnold Classic, 1st
- 2005 San Francisco Pro Invitational, 2nd
- 2006 Arnold Classic, 1st
- 2006 Mr. Olympia, 4th
- 2007 Arnold Classic, 2nd
- 2007 IFBB Australian Pro Grand Prix, 1st
- 2007 Mr. Olympia, 3rd
- 2008 Arnold Classic, 1st
- 2008 IFBB Australian Pro Grand Prix VIII, 1st
- 2008 IFBB New Zealand Grand Prix, 1st
- 2008 IFBB Russian Grand Prix, 1st
- 2008 Mr. Olympia, 1st
- 2009 Mr. Olympia, 3rd
- 2010 Arnold Classic, 4th
- 2010 IFBB Australian Pro Grand Prix, 2nd
- 2010 Mr. Olympia, 4th
- 2011 Flex Pro, 2nd
- 2011 Mr. Olympia, 6th
- 2011 FIBO Pro, 1st
- 2011 Pro Masters World Champion, 1st
- 2012 Arnold Classic, 5th
- 2012 Mr. Olympia, 4th
- 2012 IFBB Masters Olympia, 1st
- 2013 Arnold Classic, 1st
- 2013 IFBB Australian Pro Grand Prix, 1st
- 2013 Mr. Olympia, 5th
- 2013 EVLS Prague Pro, 2nd
- 2013 Tijuana Pro, 1st
- 2014 Mr. Olympia, 5th
- 2014 Arnold Classic Europe, 3rd
- 2014 Dubai Pro, 1st
- 2014 Prague Pro, 2nd
- 2015 Arnold Classic, 1st
- 2015 Arnold Classic Australia, 1st
- 2015 Arnold Classic Europe, 1st
- 2015 Mr. Olympia, 2nd
- 2015 Prague Pro, 1st
- 2016 New York Pro, 1st
- 2016 Arnold Classic South Africa, 1st
- 2016 Mr. Olympia, 3rd
- 2016 Arnold Classic Europe, 1st
- 2016 Prague Pro, 3rd
- 2016 Mr. Olympia Europe, 1st
- 2017 Mr. Olympia, 4th
- 2017 Prague Pro, 3rd
- 2018 Arnold Classic, 2nd
- 2018 IFBB Arnold Classic Australia, 3rd
- 2018 Mr. Olympia, 7th
- 2019 Tampa Pro, 1st
- 2019 Mr. Olympia, 4th
- 2020 Arnold Classic, 2nd
- 2020 Mr. Olympia, 9th
