= Jeremy Buendia =

American professional bodybuilder

- Professional bodybuilder
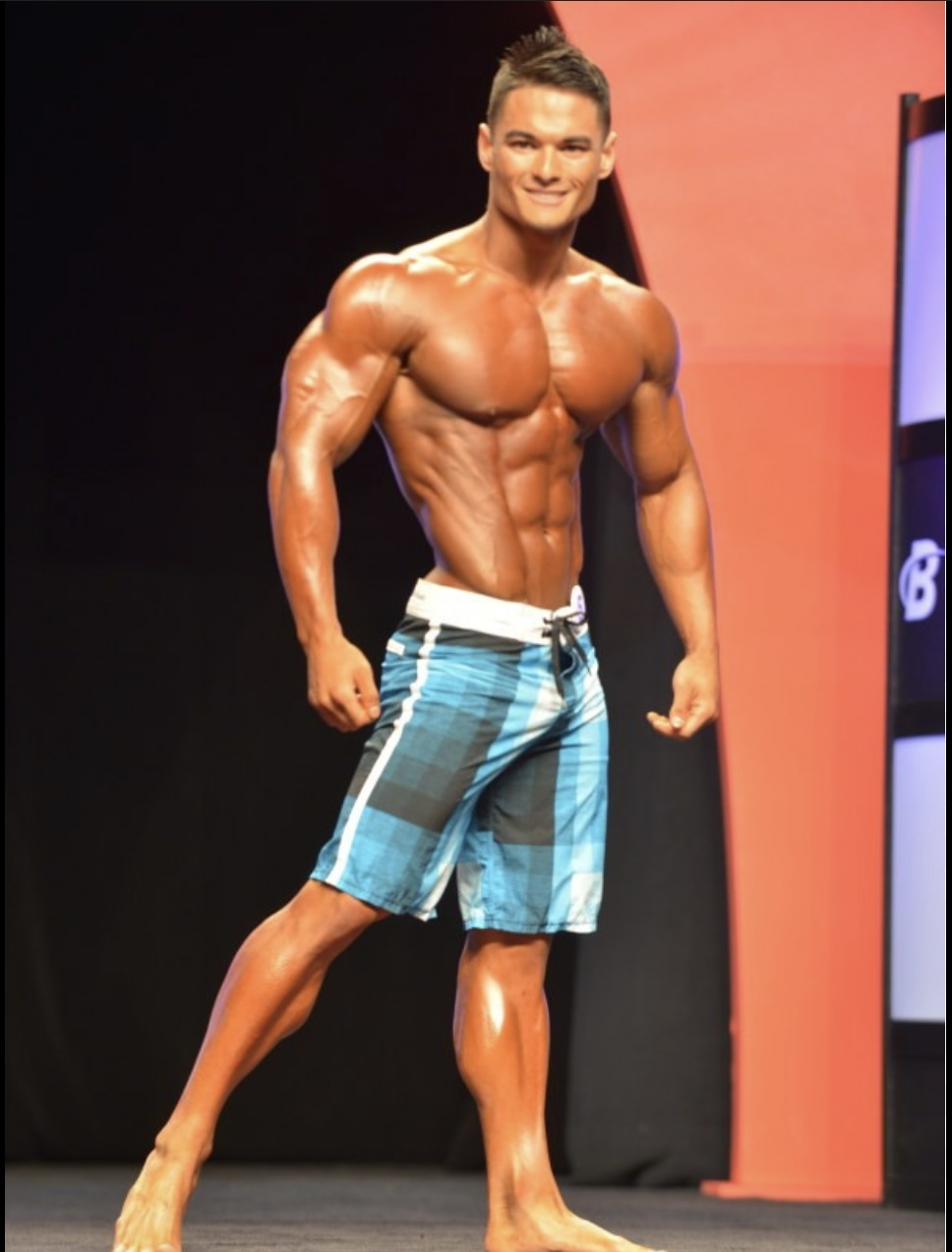

Personal info
- Born: October 26, 1990 (age 35); Roseville, California, U.S.

Best statistics
- Height: 5 ft 7 in (1.70 m)
- Weight: 175–185lb (79.4–83.9 kg)

Professional (Pro) career
- Best win: Men's Physique Mr. Olympia (2014–2017)

Jeremy Buendia (born October 26, 1990) is an American professional bodybuilder who competes in the IFBB Men's Physique Division. He is a four-time Men's Physique Mr. Olympia beginning from 2014 to 2017.

== Early life ==
Buendia was born in Roseville, California. During high school, Buendia was a linebacker at Whitney High School. Due to the rigorous nature of American football, Buendia sustained injuries to the discs in his neck and back. In part due to this injury, Buendia gained interest in the sport of bodybuilding. Buendia has stated that he was familiar with the principles of bodybuilding as his father was a non-competitive bodybuilder in the 1970s. Buendia began participating in bodybuilding competitions at the age of 17.

== Career ==
Buendia's amateur career began in 2008 where he placed 6th in the INBF Capital City Natural Bodybuilding & Figure Championships. It was this defeat that fueled his motivation during the next two years devoted to training. He began competing professionally within the International Federation of Bodybuilding and Fitness (IFBB) in 2013, where he placed 2nd in the Mr. Olympia Men's Physique class. He subsequently earned the Men's Physique Olympia title in 2014, 2015, 2016, and 2017. Buendia's four title wins set a record number. He placed 4th in the Men's Physique Olympia 2018.

While in his early to mid-twenties, Buendia became one of the youngest competitors to become Mr. Olympia. His dedication to the craft and attention to detail make him different, and he also earned himself Mr. Olympia titles from 2014 to 2017. Standing at a height of 5 feet and 8 inches, he weighs between 175 lbs and 185 lbs.

== Contest history ==
- 2008 INBF Capital City Natural Bodybuilding & Figure Championships – 6th
- 2008 INBF Capital City Natural Bodybuilding & Figure Championships – 4th
- 2010 NPC California State Bodybuilding Championships – 3rd
- 2012 NPC California Governors Cup Championships – 2nd
- 2012 NPC California Governors Cup Championships – 4th
- 2012 NPC Los Angeles Grand Prix Championships – 2nd
- 2012 NPC California State Championships – 2nd
- 2012 NPC San Francisco Championships – 7th
- 2012 NPC Excalibur Championships – 1st
- 2013 NPC Amateur Grand Prix Los Angeles – 1st
- 2013 NPC Amateur Grand Prix Los Angeles – 1st
- 2013 NPC Junior USA Championships – 1st
- 2013 IFBB Greater Gulf States Pro – 1st
- 2013 IFBB Olympia Weekend – 2nd
- 2013 IFBB Sacramento Pro – 1st
- 2014 IFBB San Jose Pro – 1st
- 2014 IFBB Olympia Weekend – 1st
- 2015 IFBB Olympia Weekend – 1st
- 2016 IFBB Olympia Weekend – 1st
- 2017 IFBB Olympia Weekend - 1st
- 2018 IFBB Olympia Weekend - 4th
- 2023 IFBB Olympia Weekend - 8th
- 2025 Sasquatch Pro - 1st
- 2025 IFBB Olympia Weekend - 8th
