= Bodybuilding at the World Games =

Bodybuilding was part of all World Games until 2009. In 2009 Fitness events were added. After violations of the Anti-Doping Rules at the 2009 games, the International World Games Association decided to suspend the sport from participating in the 2013 World Games and subsequent World Games.

== Medalist ==
=== Bodybuilding ===
==== Men ====
===== 65 kg =====
Games	Gold	Silver	Bronze
1981 Santa Clara	Renato Bertagna (ITA)	Esmat Sadek (EGY)	Joe Disinti (USA)
1985 London	Herman Hoffend (FRG)	Steve Davis (USA)	Calvin Nyuli (CAN)
1989 Karlsruhe	Bernd Haid (FRG)	Park Yong-Chul (KOR)	Alfonso Gómez (ESP)
1997 Lahti	Anwar el-Amawy (EGY)	Mohamed Abdel Aziz (EGY)	José Carlos Santos (BRA)
2001 Akita	Anwar el-Amawy (EGY)	José Carlos Santos (BRA)	Martin Ward (USA)

===== 70 kg =====
Games	Gold	Silver	Bronze
1981 Santa Clara	James Youngblood (USA)	Billy Knight (AUS)	Erwin Note (BEL)
1985 London	Sean-Paul Jenkins (USA)	El-Shahat Mabrouk (EGY)	Ian Dowe (GBR)
1989 Karlsruhe	Han Dong-Ki (KOR)	Ray Williams (USA)	Daniel Coussieu (FRA)
1993 The Hague	Eduard Derzapf (GER)	Kim Jun-Ho (KOR)	Anwar el-Amawy (EGY)
1997 Lahti	Toshihiko Hirota (JPN)	Chris Faildo (USA)	
2001 Akita	Igor Kočiš (SVK)	René Zimmermann (SUI)	Derik Farnsworth (USA)
2005 Duisburg	José Carlos Santos (BRA)	Kamil Majek (POL)	Anwar el-Amawy (EGY)
2009 Kaohsiung	Kim Byung-Soo (KOR)	Vyacheslav Makogon (UKR)	Masahiro Sue (JPN)

===== 75 kg =====
Games	Gold	Silver	Bronze
1993 The Hague	Azman bin Abdullah (SIN)	Patrick Linquet (FRA)	Ray Williams (CAN)
1997 Lahti	Kim Jun-Ho (KOR)	Juha Hakala (FIN)	Ahmed el-Sayed (EGY)
2001 Akita	Andreas Becker (GER)	Yoshihiro Yano (JPN)	Makoto Tashiro (JPN)
2005 Duisburg	Werner Zenk (GER)	Igor Kocis (SVK)	Angelo Corrado Maggiore (ITA)
2009 Kaohsiung	Boo Chang-Soon (KOR)	Igor Kocis (SVK)	Huang Chien-Chih (TPE)

===== 80 kg =====
Games	Gold	Silver	Bronze
1981 Santa Clara	Jacques Neuville (FRA)	Jesse Gautreaux (USA)	Keijo Reiman (FIN)
1985 London	David Hawk (USA)	Angelito Lesta (GBR)	Michel Devitis (FRA)
1989 Karlsruhe	Henderson Thorne (CAN)	Miroslaw Daszkiewicz (POL)	Markus Vollert (FRG)
1993 The Hague	Ian Dowe (GBR)	Gustav Ander (SWE)	Juhani Herranen (FIN)
1997 Lahti	Kester Paschke (GER)	Johnny Steward (USA)	Yrjö Jokela (FIN)
2001 Akita	Pavlos Mentis (GRE)	Juraj Vrabel (SVK)	Tito Raymond (USA)
2005 Duisburg	Juraj Vrabel (SVK)	Andreas Becker (GER)	Luiz Carlos Sarmento (BRA)
2009 Kaohsiung	Not awarded^{[a]}	Hsu Chung-Huang (TPE)	Masashi Suzuki (JPN)

- ^{Note} Beila Balog from Ukraine tested positive for various anabolic steroids, diuretics and SERMs and was therefore disqualified as well as stripped of the gold medal.

===== 85 kg =====
Games	Gold	Silver	Bronze
2005 Duisburg	Kamal Abdulsalam (QAT)	Tareq Al-Farsani (BHR)	Frank Schramm (GER)
2009 Kaohsiung	Lee Jin-Ho (KOR)	Not awarded^{[b]}	Mohamed Kotb (EGY)

- ^{Note} Luiz-Carlos Sarmento from Brazil tested positive for various anabolic steroids, tamoxifen, SERMs and excess testosterone and was therefore disqualified as well as stripped of the silver medal.

===== 90 kg =====
Games	Gold	Silver	Bronze
1997 Lahti	Milton Holloway (USA)	Ingo Fischer (GER)	János Lantos (HUN)

===== + 80 kg =====
Games	Gold	Silver	Bronze
1981 Santa Clara	John Kemper (USA)	Wayne Robins (CAN)	Ahmed el-Sayed Ibrahim (EGY)
1985 London	Berry de Mey (NED)	Matt Mendenhall (USA)	Olev Annus (FIN)
1989 Karlsruhe	Andreas Münzer (AUT)	François Gay (SUI)	Wayne Grady (USA)
1993 The Hague	Glen Gravenbeek (NED)	Svend Karlsen (NOR)	Gene Howell (USA)
2001 Akita	Olegas Zuras (LTU)	Thomas Scheu (GER)	Manfred Petautschnig (AUT)

===== + 85 kg =====
Games	Gold	Silver	Bronze
2005 Duisburg	El-Shahat Mabrouk (EGY)	Ali Tabrizi Nouri (QAT)	Thomas Scheu (GER)
2009 Kaohsiung	Not awarded^{[c]}	Not awarded^{[d]}	Peter Tatarka (SVK)

- ^{Note} Oleksandr Bilous from Ukraine tested positive for various masking agents, diuretics and excess testosterone and was therefore disqualified as well as stripped of the gold medal.
- ^{Note} Kamal Abdulsalam from Qatar tested positive for tamoxifen and was therefore disqualified as well as stripped of the silver medal.

===== + 90 kg =====
Games	Gold	Silver	Bronze
1997 Lahti	Walter Lettner (AUT)	Peter Keränen (FIN)	Olegas Zuras (LTU)

==== Women ====
===== 52 kg =====
Games	Gold	Silver	Bronze
1981 Santa Clara	Pam Brooks (USA)	Josée Baumgartner (FRA)	Christine Reed (USA)
1985 London	Dona Oliveira (USA)	Renate Holland (FRG)	Donna Lea (CAN)
1989 Karlsruhe	Helga Popp (FRG)	Kay Caseley (GBR)	Sharon Lewis (USA)
1993 The Hague	Andrulla Blanchette (GBR)	Jee Jong Quah (SIN)	Ina Lopulissa (NED)
1997 Lahti	Utako Mizuma (JPN)	Katja Rydström (FIN)	Heike Jung (GER)
2001 Akita	Pam Kusar (USA)	Utako Mizuma (JPN)	Sandra Weber (GER)
2005 Duisburg	Iryna Petrenko (UKR)	Lo Kit Ming (HKG)	Cao Xinli (CHN)

===== 55 kg =====
Games	Gold	Silver	Bronze
2009 Kaohsiung	Jana Purdjaková (SVK)	Alina Cepurniene (LIT)	Natalia Dichkovskaya (UKR)

===== 57 kg =====
Games	Gold	Silver	Bronze
1993 The Hague	Martha Sánchez (MEX)	Maria Aicher (GER)	Elena Sesana (ITA)
1997 Lahti	Barbara Furer (SUI)	Rita Rinner (LIE)	

===== + 52 kg =====
Games	Gold	Silver	Bronze
1981 Santa Clara	Kike Elomaa (FIN)	Gail Schroeter (USA)	Deborah Diana (USA)
1985 London	Chris Wesenberg (CAN)	Dominique Darde (FRA)	Hildegard Schäfer (FRG)
1989 Karlsruhe	Christa Bauch (FRG)	Jutta Tippelt (FRG)	Claudia Montemaggi (ITA)
2001 Akita	Cornelia Junker (GER)	Susanne Niederhauser (AUT)	Jana Purdjaková (SVK)
2005 Duisburg	Agnieszka Ryk (POL)	Aurelia Grozajová (SVK)	Simone Linay (GER)

===== + 57 kg =====
Games	Gold	Silver	Bronze
1993 The Hague	Conny Plösser (GER)	Gunilla Söderberg (SWE)	Linda Forbin (FRA)
1997 Lahti	Michaela Baumer (GER)	Pauliina Kosola (FIN)	Anne Oksanen (FIN)

=== Fitness ===
==== Women ====
===== Fitness Open =====
Games	Gold	Silver	Bronze
2009 Kaohsiung	Diana Almeida (BRA)	Alevtyna Titarenko (UKR)	Anna Mozolany-Urbanikova (SVK)
