= Bodybuilding at the 2005 World Games – Men's +85 kg =

Event at World Games

Bodybuilding men's +85 kg at the World Games
- Venue: TAM Theatre, Duisburg, Germany
- Date: 16–17 July 2005
- Competitors: 5 from 5 nations

Medalists
1st place, gold medalist(s)		El-Shahat Mabrouk	Egypt
2nd place, silver medalist(s)		Ali Tabrizi	Qatar
3rd place, bronze medalist(s)		Thomas Scheu	Germany

The men's +85 kg event in bodybuilding at the 2005 World Games in Duisburg was played from 16 to 17 July. The bodybuilding competition took place in TAM Theatre.

== Competition format ==
A total of 5 athletes entered the competition. All of them advanced to the final rounds. Scores from round 1 doesn't count in final rounds.

== Results ==
Rank	Athlete	Nation	Round 1	Round 2	Round 3	Score
1st place, gold medalist(s)	El-Shahat Mabrouk	Egypt	9	8	12	20
2nd place, silver medalist(s)	Ali Tabrizi	Qatar	10	9	11	20
3rd place, bronze medalist(s)	Thomas Scheu	Germany	11	13	10	23
4	Vitālijs Aleksandrovs	Latvia	20	21	19	40
5	Ott Kiivikas	Estonia	25	24	25	49
