= Powerlifting at the 2001 World Games – Men's middleweight =

Powerlifting men's middleweight at the 2001 World Games
- Venue: Akita City Culture Hall, Akita, Japan
- Date: 21 August 2001
- Competitors: 9 from 6 nations

Medalists
gold medal	(Russia) Viktor Furazhkin
silver medal	(Russia) Andrey Tarasenko
bronze medal	(Russia) Sergey Mor

The men's middleweight competition in powerlifting at the 2001 World Games took place on 21 August 2001 at the Akita City Culture Hall in Akita, Japan.

== Competition format ==
A total of 9 athletes entered the competition. Each athlete had 3 attempts in each of 3 events: squat, bench press and deadlift. The athlete with the biggest score in Wilks points is the winner.

== Results ==
Rank	Athlete	Nation	Weight	Squat	Bench press	Deadlift	Total weight	Total points
1st place, gold medalist(s)	Viktor Furazhkin	Russia	74.6	310.0	207.5	305.0	822.5	588.252
2nd place, silver medalist(s)	Andrey Tarasenko	Russia	89.0	345.0	240.0	320.0	905.0	581.101
3rd place, bronze medalist(s)	Sergey Mor	Russia	82.2	327.5	212.5	312.5	852.5	572.369
4	Petr Theuser	Czech Republic	89.5	342.5	227.5	305.0	875.0	560.175
5	Dovran Turakhanov	Kazakhstan	74.8	292.5	172.5	292.5	757.5	540.779
6	Dmytro Solovyov	Ukraine	82.3	310.0	215.0	280.0	805.0	540.075
7	Robert Wagner	United States	89.3	335.0	200.0	302.5	837.5	536.838
8	Koki Takahashi	Japan	74.9	292.5	195.0	265.0	752.5	536.683
9	Wataru Kobayakawa	Japan	82.1	285.0	190.0	272.5	747.5	502.245
