= Bodybuilding at the 2001 World Games – Men's 80 kg =

Bodybuilding men's 80 kg at the World Games
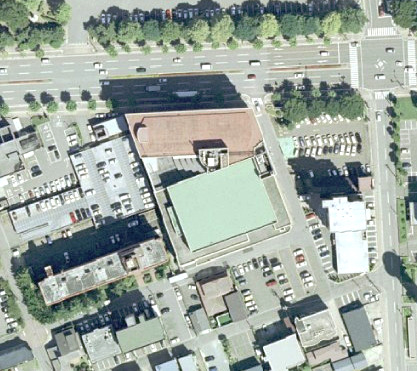
- Akita City Culture Hall
- Venue: Akita City Culture Hall, Akita, Japan
- Date: 18–19 August 2001
- Competitors: 7 from 7 nations

Medalists
1st place, gold medalist(s)		Pavlos Mentis	Greece
2nd place, silver medalist(s)		Juraj Vrábel	Slovakia
3rd place, bronze medalist(s)		Tito Raymond	United States

The men's 80 kg event in bodybuilding at the 2001 World Games in Akita was played from 18 to 19 August. The bodybuilding competition took place at Akita City Culture Hall.

== Competition format ==
A total of 7 athletes entered the competition.

== Results ==
Rank	Athlete	Nation
1st place, gold medalist(s)	Pavlos Mentis	Greece
2nd place, silver medalist(s)	Juraj Vrábel	Slovakia
3rd place, bronze medalist(s)	Tito Raymond	United States
4	Semion Berkovic	Lithuania
5	Hidetada Yamagishi	Japan
6	Liaw Teck Leong	Malaysia
7	Joe Duenas	Guam
