= Bodybuilding at the 2001 World Games – Women's +52 kg =

Bodybuilding women's +52 kg at the World Games
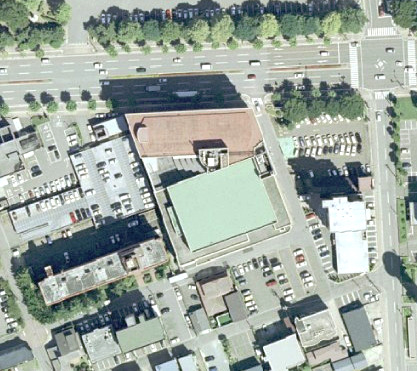
- Akita City Culture Hall
- Venue: Akita City Culture Hall, Akita, Japan
- Date: 18–19 August 2001
- Competitors: 8 from 8 nations

Medalists
1st place, gold medalist(s)		Cornelia Junker	Germany
2nd place, silver medalist(s)		Susanne Niederhauser	Austria
3rd place, bronze medalist(s)		Jana Purdjaková	Slovakia

The women's +52 kg event in bodybuilding at the 2001 World Games in Akita was played from 18 to 19 August. The bodybuilding competition took place at Akita City Culture Hall.

== Competition format ==
A total of 8 athletes entered the competition.

== Results ==
Rank	Athlete	Nation
1st place, gold medalist(s)	Cornelia Junker	Germany
2nd place, silver medalist(s)	Susanne Niederhauser	Austria
3rd place, bronze medalist(s)	Jana Purdjaková	Slovakia
4	Michela Grassetto	Italy
5	Marja Kalvala	Finland
6	Aki Nishimoto	Japan
7	Joan Liew Lee Ting	Singapore
8	Della Thomas-Bain	Bahamas
