= 2019 Mr. Olympia =

Bodybuilding competition

- Genre: Professional bodybuilding competition
- Country: United States
- Previous event: 2018 Mr. Olympia
- Next event: 2020 Mr. Olympia
- Organizer: IFBB Pro League
- People: Mr. Olympia : Brandon Curry 212 Olympia: Kamal Elgargni; Bikini Olympia: Elisa Pecini; CP Olympia: Chris Bumstead; MP Olympia: Raymont Edmonds; WP Olympia: Shanique Grant; Fitness Olympia: Whitney Jones Figure Olympia: Cydney Gillon

The 2019 Mr. Olympia contest was a weekend long IFBB professional bodybuilding competition that was held on September 12 to 14, 2019, in Las Vegas, Nevada. This was the 55th Mr. Olympia competition celebrated. The weekend competition is also known as the Joe Weider's Olympia Fitness and Performance Weekend. While the main event was the competition for the title of Mr. Olympia, several other events were held which includes the Amateur competition and sports expo.

On September 12, 2019, a press conference was held on Orleans Arena.

On September 13, 2019, prejudging and finals for Fitness Olympia, Figure Olympia and Classic Physique were held and livestream via Amazon Prime. Mr. Olympia pre-judging was also held on the same night.

On September 14, 2019, the Men's Physique Olympia and Women's Physique Olympia judging and finals were held in the morning at Las Vegas Convention Center. At night, the Bikini Olympia, 212 Olympia and Mr. Olympia finals were held at Orleans Arena.

On September 16, 2019, an Olympia Superstar Seminar was held.

Shawn Rhoden, the previous year Mr Olympia 2018, was not allowed to compete for legal reasons, so there was no defending champion this year.

Brandon Curry won his first Mr Olympia title.

== Results ==
Place	Prize	Name	Country	Judging	Finals	Total
1	$400,000	Brandon Curry	(United States)	7	7	14
2	$150,000	William Bonac	(Netherlands)	10	11	21
3	$100,000	Hadi Choopan	(Iran)	17	12	29
4	$55,000	Dexter Jackson	(United States)	18	25	43
5	$45,000	Roelly Winklaar	(Curaçao)	25	20	45
6	$35,000	Steve Kuclo	(United States)	30	30	60
7	$25,000	Cedric McMillan	(United States)	46	35	81
8	$20,000	Lukáš Osladil	(Czech Republic)	40	44	84
9	$18,000	Akim Williams	(United States)	37	49	86
10	$16,000	Patrick Moore	(United States)	55	41	96
11		Luke Sandoe	(United Kingdom)	49	55	104
12		Jonathan DeLaRosa	(United States)	60	60	120
13		Maxx Charles	(United States)	67	67	134
14		Juan Morel	(United States)	68	68	136
15		Michael Lockett	(United States)	75	75	150
16		Mohamed Shaaban	(Egypt)	80	79	159

== Other results ==
- Raymont Edmonds won the Men's Physique Olympia title dethroning Brandon Hendrickson.
- Shanique Grant won the Women's Physique Olympia title.
- Chris Bumstead won the Classic Physique title for the first time dethroning Breon Ansley.
- Whitney Jones won Fitness Olympia title.
- Cydney Gillon won the 2019 Figure Olympia title for the third consecutive time.
- Elisa Pecini won 2019 Bikini Olympia dethroning Angelica Teixeira.
