= Bodybuilding at the 2005 World Games – Men's 70 kg =

Bodybuilding men's 70 kg at the World Games
- Venue: TAM Theatre, Duisburg, Germany
- Date: 16–17 July 2005
- Competitors: 8 from 7 nations

Medalists
1st place, gold medalist(s)		José Carlos Santos	Brazil
2nd place, silver medalist(s)		Kamil Majek	Poland
3rd place, bronze medalist(s)		Anwar El-Amawy	Egypt

The men's 70 kg event in bodybuilding at the 2005 World Games in Duisburg was played from 16 to 17 July. The bodybuilding competition took place in TAM Theatre.

== Competition format ==
A total of 8 athletes entered the competition. The best five athletes from round 1 advances to the final rounds. Scores from round 1 doesn't count in final rounds.

== Results ==
Rank	Athlete	Nation	Round 1	Round 2	Round 3	Score
1st place, gold medalist(s)	José Carlos Santos	Brazil	8	8	7	15
2nd place, silver medalist(s)	Kamil Majek	Poland	10	8	9	17
3rd place, bronze medalist(s)	Anwar El-Amawy	Egypt	16	16	18	34
4	Abdul Halim Haron	Singapore	18	19	16	35
5	Lin Peiqu	China	26	25	25	50
6	Thomas Nuhn	Germany	29			29
7	Ibrahim Bin Sihat	Singapore	36			36
8	Jiří Černota	Czech Republic	39			39
