= Bodybuilding at the 2005 World Games – Men's 80 kg =

Bodybuilding men's 80 kg at the World Games
- Venue: TAM Theatre, Duisburg, Germany
- Date: 16–17 July 2005
- Competitors: 7 from 7 nations

Medalists
1st place, gold medalist(s)		Juraj Vrábel	Slovakia
2nd place, silver medalist(s)		Andreas Becker	Germany
3rd place, bronze medalist(s)		Luiz Carlos Sarmento	Brazil

The men's 80 kg event in bodybuilding at the 2005 World Games in Duisburg was played from 16 to 17 July. The bodybuilding competition took place in TAM Theatre.

== Competition format ==
A total of 7 athletes entered the competition. The best five athletes from round 1 advances to the final rounds. Scores from round 1 doesn't count in final rounds.

== Results ==
Rank	Athlete	Nation	Round 1	Round 2	Round 3	Score
1st place, gold medalist(s)	Juraj Vrábel	Slovakia	7	6	9	15
2nd place, silver medalist(s)	Andreas Becker	Germany	9	11	12	23
3rd place, bronze medalist(s)	Luiz Carlos Sarmento	Brazil	14	14	12	26
4	Jan Kubik	Czech Republic	20	21	21	42
5	Youssry Abou Youssef	Egypt	26	23	21	44
6	Koichi Aikawa	Japan	29			29
7	Mohamed Ismail bin Muhammad	Singapore	35			35
