= Chris Bumstead =

Canadian bodybuilder (born 1995)

Christopher Adam Bumstead
- ♂ Professional bodybuilder
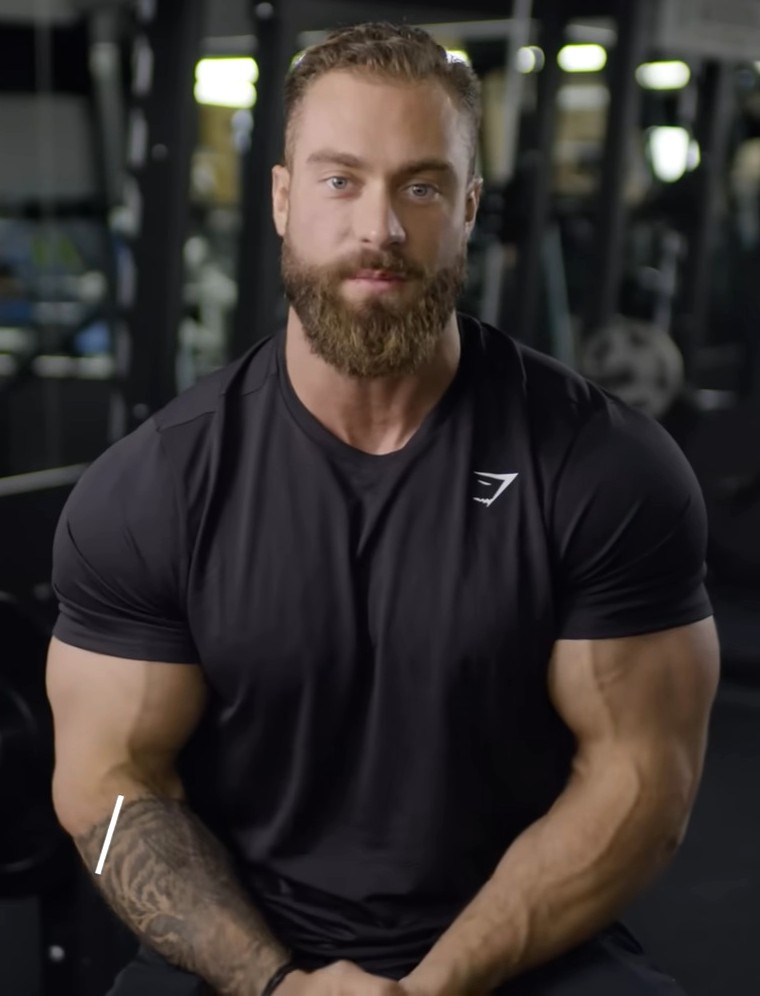
- Bumstead in 2022

Personal info
- Nickname: Cbum, The Standard
- Born: February 2, 1995 (age 31); Ottawa, Ontario, Canada

Best statistics
- Height: 6 ft 1 in (1.85 m)
- Weight: Contest: 240 lb (109 kg); Off-season: 260 lb (118 kg)

Professional (Pro) career
- Pro-debut: IFBB North American Championships; 2017
- Best win: Mr. Olympia Classic Physique winner; 2019–2024
- Successor: Ramon "Dino" Queiroz
- Active: 2014–2025
Medal record
Men's Bodybuilding
IFBB Mr. Olympia
2nd	2017 Mr. Olympia	Classic Physique
2nd	2018 Mr. Olympia	Classic Physique
1st	2019 Mr. Olympia	Classic Physique
1st	2020 Mr. Olympia	Classic Physique
1st	2021 Mr. Olympia	Classic Physique
1st	2022 Mr. Olympia	Classic Physique
1st	2023 Mr. Olympia	Classic Physique
1st	2024 Mr. Olympia	Classic Physique
Other IFBB Pro contests
2nd	2024 EVLS Prague Pro	Men's Open

Christopher Adam Bumstead (born 2 February 1995), also known as CBum, is a Canadian retired professional bodybuilder best known for six consecutive Mr. Olympia titles. Bumstead made his competitive debut in 2014 and obtained his IFBB pro card in 2016 After placing second in the Mr. Olympia Classic Physique category in 2017 and 2018, he earned six consecutive wins from 2019 to 2024, the longest in the history of the competition. He is widely considered the greatest Classic Physique bodybuilder of all time. His popularity is often credited for bringing mainstream attention to the sport of modern bodybuilding on a global level.

== Early life ==
Bumstead was born and raised in Stittsville, Ottawa, Ontario, Canada. In primary school, he was involved in football, baseball, basketball, and hockey which all contributed to his early interest in physical development. He attended Dalhousie University in Halifax, Nova Scotia.

== Career ==
=== Early beginnings (2008–2016) ===
Growing up, powerlifting was only a hobby for Bumstead. He began weightlifting at age 14, and in the next 4 years, he went from 170 to 225 pounds (77 to 102 kg), growing his legs the most. His sister's boyfriend, Iain Valliere, saw Bumstead's potential and helped him prepare to compete throughout his high school years. After building a competitive physique under coach Valliere's guidance, Bumstead began competing.

Bumstead made his competitive debut in 2014 at 19 years old. Bumstead's first bodybuilding show was a regional level show in Ontario, in which he participated alongside his sister, Melissa Valliere. They both won their overall titles, with Bumstead winning as a junior. Following his success, he found himself in love with the sport of bodybuilding, and began to work with Iain first hand.

=== Earning IFBB pro card and early success (2016–2019) ===
Bumstead obtained his IFBB pro card at age 21 after claiming the 2016 IFBB North American Bodybuilding Championship. He later placed third overall in his first professional show.

In 2017, he won both the 2017 IFBB Pittsburgh Pro and the 2017 IFBB Toronto Pro Supershow.That same year, Bumstead placed second in his first Mr. Olympia in the Classic Physique category.

Bumstead was hospitalized 4 weeks out from the 2018 Mr. Olympia due to severe water retention related to a kidney complication. After spending three nights in the emergency room, Bumstead continued to train, but this was a significant setback.

=== Mr. Olympia Classic Physique winning streak (2019–2024) ===
Bumstead won his first Mr. Olympia Classic Physique title in 2019, sparking a winning streak that lasted until 2024. He defended his title from 2020 to 2024, totaling in six total consecutive wins.

On September 13, 2021, Bumstead signed with RAW Nutrition, a supplement company. Since then, Bumstead created his signature series, selling gym supplements such as pre-workouts and protein powders.

On October 19, 2022, Bumstead and Valliere formally announced they would no longer be working together as Valliere transitioned to also compete in the Open division. Beginning in 2022, he was coached by Hany Rambod, a leading bodybuilding coach.

In an Instagram reel published on September 6, 2024, Bumstead hinted at a significant announcement to be revealed on September 9. On that day, Bumstead posted another reel, revealing that he had become both a part-owner and an athlete for Gymshark.

Bumstead announced his retirement after winning his 6th Mr. Olympia Classic Division title on October 13, 2024, at the 2024 Mr. Olympia.

On October 28, 2024, Bumstead announced that he will make his Men's Open Division debut at the 2024 EVLS Prague Pro. He emphasized that this was because of his current conditioning from the preceding 2024 Mr. Olympia, calling it “One more run just for fun, giving the people what they want” before stepping into retirement. He competed at the 2024 EVLS Prague Pro Finals, where he placed second. He confirmed his earlier announced retirement after the event.

== Retirement and legacy ==
Following his record 6th victory at the Mr. Olympia Classic Physique in 2024, Bumstead announced his intention to retire from the sport.

Bumstead is the most decorated competitor in the Classic Physique division, with wins from 2019 to 2024 and been the first runner-up for 2017 and 2018.

Multiple prominent figures in bodybuilding have commented on his physique and impact on the sport. Eight-time Mr. Olympia winner Ronnie Coleman stated, "I think Chris Bumstead is the greatest Classic bodybuilder of all-time. Absolutely the best physique I’ve ever seen in Classic Physique. Gotta be the best physique I’ve ever seen period." Bodybuilding judge Terrick El Guindy stated, "Chris Bumstead has exploded the sport. Chris Bumstead has been a great, great role model for all of us. His journey is impeccable and we will remember him just like we remember Arnold Schwarzenegger."

== Personal life ==
Since 2018, Bumstead has been in a relationship with Courtney King, the 2016 Bikini Olympia champion. The couple were engaged on September 26, 2022. They have two daughters, Bradley, born on April 22, 2024, and Blake, born on January 11, 2026.

Aside from competing, Bumstead is known for his openness with controversial topics in the fitness industry, such as steroids. He is also involved in the supplement industry with his own line of products. As of 2026, he has over 26 million followers on Instagram and over 4 million subscribers on YouTube.

== Contest history ==
- 2016 IFBB North American Championships, Heavyweight, 1st (earned IFBB pro card)
- 2016 IFBB Dayana Cadeau Classic, Classic Physique, 3rd
- 2017 IFBB Pittsburgh Pro, Classic Physique, 1st
- 2017 IFBB Toronto Pro, Classic Physique, 1st
- 2017 Mr. Olympia, Classic Physique, 2nd
- 2018 Mr. Olympia, Classic Physique, 2nd
- 2019 Mr. Olympia, Classic Physique, 1st
- 2020 Mr. Olympia, Classic Physique, 1st
- 2021 Mr. Olympia, Classic Physique, 1st
- 2022 Mr. Olympia, Classic Physique, 1st
- 2023 Mr. Olympia, Classic Physique, 1st
- 2024 Mr. Olympia, Classic Physique, 1st
- 2024 IFBB EVLS Prague Pro, Men's Open, 2nd
