= Bodybuilding at the 2001 World Games – Men's 75 kg =

Bodybuilding men's 75 kg at the World Games
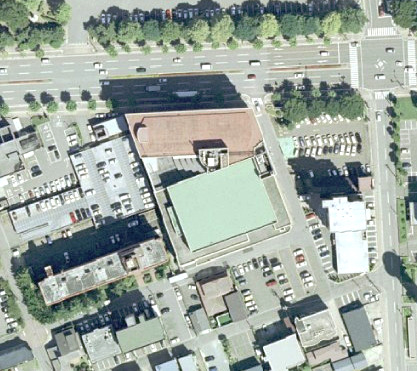
- Akita City Culture Hall
- Venue: Akita City Culture Hall, Akita, Japan
- Date: 18–19 August 2001
- Competitors: 8 from 6 nations

Medalists
1st place, gold medalist(s)		Andreas Becker	Germany
2nd place, silver medalist(s)		Yoshihiro Yano	Japan
3rd place, bronze medalist(s)		Makoto Tashiro	Japan

The men's 75 kg event in bodybuilding at the 2001 World Games in Akita was played from 18 to 19 August. The bodybuilding competition took place at Akita City Culture Hall.

== Competition format ==
A total of 8 athletes entered the competition.

== Results ==
Rank	Athlete	Nation
1st place, gold medalist(s)	Andreas Becker	Germany
2nd place, silver medalist(s)	Yoshihiro Yano	Japan
3rd place, bronze medalist(s)	Makoto Tashiro	Japan
4	Mariano Villena	Switzerland
5	Noh Woo-hyun	South Korea
6	Kenji Kondo	Japan
7	Patrick Mounier	New Caledonia
8	Mohamed Ismail bin Muhammad	Singapore
