= Bodybuilding at the 2001 World Games =

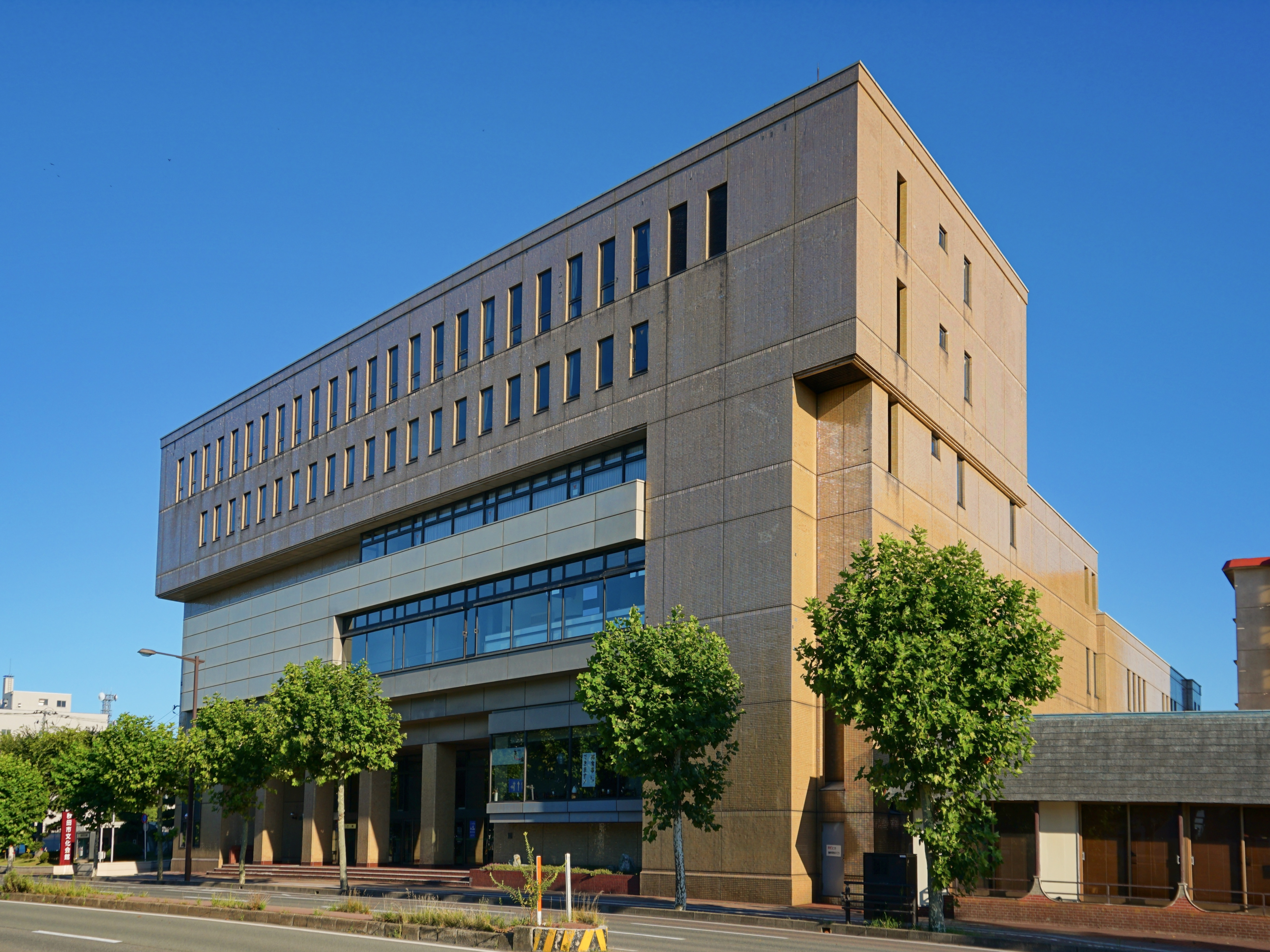
- Akita City Culture Hall
- Venue: Akita City Culture Hall
- Dates: 18–19 August 2001
- Competitors: 55 from 22 nations

The bodybuilding events at the 2001 World Games in Akita was played between 18 and 19 August. 55 athletes, from 22 nations, participated in the tournament. The competition took place in Akita City Culture Hall.

== Participating nations ==
- Austria (2)
- Bahamas (2)
- Brazil (1)
- Canada (1)
- China (1)
- Egypt (1)
- Finland (1)
- Germany (4)
- Greece (1)
- Guam (1)
- Italy (1)
- Japan (12)
- South Korea (5)
- Lithuania (2)
- Malaysia (1)
- New Caledonia (1)
- Singapore (5)
- Switzerland (2)
- Slovakia (4)
- Ukraine (1)
- United States (5)
- Vietnam (1)

== Medal table ==
Rank	Nation	Gold	Silver	Bronze	Total
1	Germany	2	1	1	4
2	Slovakia	1	1	1	3
3	United States	1	0	3	4
4	Egypt	1	0	0	1
4	Greece	1	0	0	1
4	Lithuania	1	0	0	1
7	Japan	0	2	1	3
8	Austria	0	1	1	2
9	Brazil	0	1	0	1
9	Switzerland	0	1	0	1
Totals (10 entries)		7	7	7	21

== Events ==
=== Men ===
Event	Gold	Silver	Bronze
65 kg	Anwar El-Amawy; Egypt	José Carlos Santos; Brazil	Marvin Ward; United States
70 kg	Igor Kočiš; Slovakia	René Zimmermann; Switzerland	Derik Farnsworth; United States
75 kg	Andreas Becker; Germany	Yoshihiro Yano; Japan	Makoto Tashiro; Japan
80 kg	Pavlos Mentis; Greece	Juraj Vrábel; Slovakia	Tito Raymond; United States
+80 kg	Olegas Žuras; Lithuania	Thomas Scheu; Germany	Manfred Petautschnig; Austria

=== Women ===
Event	Gold	Silver	Bronze
52 kg	Pam Kusar; United States	Utako Mizuma; Japan	Sandra Weber; Germany
+52 kg	Cornelia Junker; Germany	Susanne Niederhauser; Austria	Jana Purdjaková; Slovakia
