= Centopani =

Centopani is an Italian surname. Notable people with the surname include:

- Evan Centopani (born 1981), American bodybuilder
- Paul Roma (born 1960), ring name of American wrestler Paul Centopani, uncle of Evan
