= Bodybuilding at the 2001 World Games – Men's 65 kg =

Bodybuilding men's 65 kg at the World Games
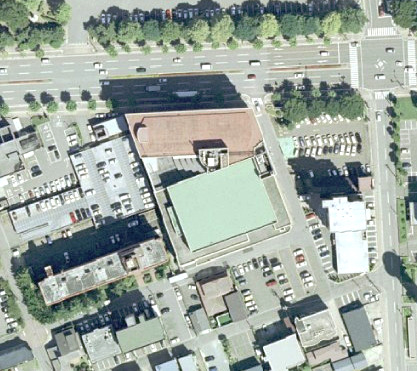
- Akita City Culture Hall
- Venue: Akita City Culture Hall, Akita, Japan
- Date: 18–19 August 2001
- Competitors: 8 from 7 nations

Medalists
1st place, gold medalist(s)		Anwar El-Amawy	Egypt
2nd place, silver medalist(s)		José Carlos Santos	Brazil
3rd place, bronze medalist(s)		Marvin Ward	United States

The men's 65 kg event in bodybuilding at the 2001 World Games in Akita was played from 18 to 19 August. The bodybuilding competition took place at Akita City Culture Hall.

== Competition format ==
A total of 8 athletes entered the competition.

== Results ==
Rank	Athlete	Nation
1st place, gold medalist(s)	Anwar El-Amawy	Egypt
2nd place, silver medalist(s)	José Carlos Santos	Brazil
3rd place, bronze medalist(s)	Marvin Ward	United States
4	Park Kyeong-mo	South Korea
5	Hiroshi Tsuda	Japan
6	Cao Quoc Phu	Vietnam
7	Lionel Williams	Bahamas
8	Eiichi Ishikawa	Japan
