= Bodybuilding at the 2005 World Games – Women's +52 kg =

Bodybuilding women's +52 kg at the World Games
- Venue: TAM Theatre, Duisburg, Germany
- Date: 16–17 July 2005
- Competitors: 12 from 10 nations

Medalists
1st place, gold medalist(s)		Agnieszka Ryk	Poland
2nd place, silver medalist(s)		Aurélia Grožajová	Slovakia
3rd place, bronze medalist(s)		Simone Linay	Germany

The women's +52 kg event in bodybuilding at the 2005 World Games in Duisburg was played from 16 to 17 July. The bodybuilding competition took place in TAM Theatre.

== Competition format ==
A total of 12 athletes entered the competition. The best five athletes from round 1 advances to the final rounds. Scores from round 1 doesn't count in final rounds.

== Results ==
Rank	Athlete	Nation	Round 1	Round 2	Round 3	Score
1st place, gold medalist(s)	Agnieszka Ryk	Poland	9	9	7	16
2nd place, silver medalist(s)	Aurélia Grožajová	Slovakia	6	7	16	23
3rd place, bronze medalist(s)	Simone Linay	Germany	20	15	13	28
4	Liang Yueyun	China	26	21	15	36
5	Salla Kauranen	Finland	22	22	25	47
6	Cornelia Hakuba	Germany	29			29
7	Erika Taksonyi	Hungary	29			29
8	Lyudmila Tuboltseva	Russia	42			42
9	Aki Nishimoto	Japan	46			46
10	Darina Kanova	Czech Republic	50			50
11	Birgita Bolsichinova	Czech Republic	51			51
12	Lori Hayden	Guam	60			60
