= Bodybuilding at the 2001 World Games – Men's 70 kg =

Bodybuilding men's 70 kg at the World Games
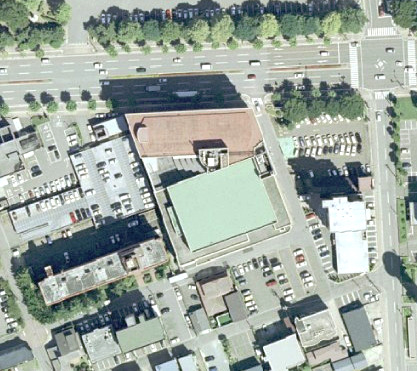
- Akita City Culture Hall
- Venue: Akita City Culture Hall, Akita, Japan
- Date: 18–19 August 2001
- Competitors: 8 from 7 nations

Medalists
1st place, gold medalist(s)		Igor Kočiš	Slovakia
2nd place, silver medalist(s)		René Zimmermann	Switzerland
3rd place, bronze medalist(s)		Derik Farnsworth	United States

The men's 70 kg event in bodybuilding at the 2001 World Games in Akita was played from 18 to 19 August. The bodybuilding competition took place at Akita City Culture Hall.

== Competition format ==
A total of 8 athletes entered the competition.

== Results ==
Rank	Athlete	Nation
1st place, gold medalist(s)	Igor Kočiš	Slovakia
2nd place, silver medalist(s)	René Zimmermann	Switzerland
3rd place, bronze medalist(s)	Marvin Ward	United States
4	Koji Godo	Japan
5	Abdul Halim Haron	Singapore
6	Lim Jong-nam	South Korea
7	Toshihiko Hirota	Japan
8	Ma Zhitao	China
