= Powerlifting at the 2001 World Games – Women's middleweight =

Powerlifting women's middleweight at the 2001 World Games
- Venue: Akita City Culture Hall, Akita, Japan
- Date: 20 August 2001
- Competitors: 12 from 9 nations

Medalists
gold medal	(Russia) Marina Kudinova
silver medal	(Russia) Irina Abramova
bronze medal	(Finland) Pirjo Savola

The women's middleweight competition in powerlifting at the 2001 World Games took place on 20 August 2001 at the Akita City Culture Hall in Akita, Japan.

== Competition format ==
A total of 12 athletes entered the competition. Each athlete had 3 attempts in each of 3 events: squat, bench press and deadlift. The athlete with the biggest score in Wilks points is the winner.

== Results ==
Rank	Athlete	Nation	Weight	Squat	Bench press	Deadlift	Total weight	Total points
1st place, gold medalist(s)	Marina Kudinova	Russia	67.1	247.5 WR	147.5 =WR	225.0	620.0 WR	635.500
2nd place, silver medalist(s)	Irina Abramova	Russia	61.2	210.0	115.0	212.5	537.5	590.175
3rd place, bronze medalist(s)	Pirjo Savola	Finland	55.5	185.0	87.5	200.0	472.5	559.865
4	Birgit Fischer	Germany	59.4	187.5	90.0	215.0	492.5	553.373
5	Ayako Ikeya	Japan	58.7	190.0	102.5	185.0	477.5	541.485
6	Hsu Hsiao-li	Chinese Taipei	63.8	180.0	107.5	202.5	490.0	521.262
7	Nadejda Malyugina	Uzbekistan	59.5	185.0	87.5	170.0	442.5	496.529
8	Angie Overdeer	United States	59.6	155.0	100.0	175.0	430.0	481.901
9	Sandra Mobley	United States	59.7	165.0	87.5	170.0	422.5	472.862
10	Kumi Kobayashi	Japan	55.1	132.5	110.0	150.0	392.5	467.703
11	Kimberly Dennis	Canada	66.3	140.0	80.0	140.0	360.0	372.204
	Antonietta Orsini	Italy	65.2	205.0	NM	-	DNF	DNF
