= Powerlifting at the 2001 World Games – Women's heavyweight =

Powerlifting women's heavyweight at the 2001 World Games
- Venue: Akita City Culture Hall, Akita, Japan
- Date: 20 August 2001
- Competitors: 11 from 6 nations

Medalists
gold medal	(Russia) Svetlana Miklashevich
silver medal	(Russia) Natalia Payusova
bronze medal	(Chinese Taipei) Chao Chen-yeh

The women's heavyweight competition in powerlifting at the 2001 World Games took place on 20 August 2001 at the Akita City Culture Hall in Akita, Japan.

== Competition format ==
A total of 11 athletes entered the competition. Each athlete had 3 attempts in each of 3 events: squat, bench press and deadlift. The athlete with the biggest score in Wilks points is the winner.

== Results ==
Rank	Athlete	Nation	Weight	Squat	Bench press	Deadlift	Total weight	Total points
1st place, gold medalist(s)	Svetlana Miklashevich	Russia	74.9	220.0	170.0	215.0	605.0	575.597
2nd place, silver medalist(s)	Natalia Payusova	Russia	89.5	230.0	160.0	235.0	625.0	541.313
3rd place, bronze medalist(s)	Chao Chen-yeh	Chinese Taipei	112.5	265.0	177.5	225.0	667.5	540.208
4	Inger Blikra	Norway	69.0	205.0	112.5	200.0	517.5	519.984
5	Cecile Jamin	France	69.3	200.0	97.5	217.5	515.0	515.927
6	Leslie Look	United States	82.3	225.0	115.0	220.0	560.0	504.616
7	Harriet Hall	United States	103.5	225.0	132.5	212.5	570.0	470.079
8	Lizabeth Willett	United States	139.9	255.0	137.5	202.5	595.0	462.732
9	Midori Kato	Japan	85.3	177.5	90.0	182.5	450.0	398.295
10	Mariko Seino	Japan	68.0	140.0	72.5	135.0	347.5	352.817
	Lee Chia-sui	Chinese Taipei	119.1	265.0	NM	-	DNF	DNF
