= Bodybuilding at the 2001 World Games – Women's 52 kg =

Bodybuilding women's 52 kg at the World Games
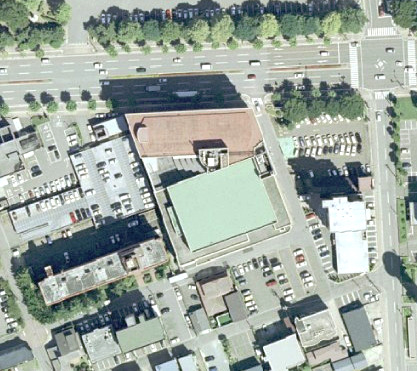
- Akita City Culture Hall
- Venue: Akita City Culture Hall, Akita, Japan
- Date: 18–19 August 2001
- Competitors: 7 from 5 nations

Medalists
1st place, gold medalist(s)		Pam Kusar	United States
2nd place, silver medalist(s)		Utako Mizuma	Japan
3rd place, bronze medalist(s)		Sandra Weber	Germany

The women's 52 kg event in bodybuilding at the 2001 World Games in Akita was played from 18 to 19 August. The bodybuilding competition took place at Akita City Culture Hall.

== Competition format ==
A total of 7 athletes entered the competition.

== Results ==
Rank	Athlete	Nation
1st place, gold medalist(s)	Pam Kusar	United States
2nd place, silver medalist(s)	Utako Mizuma	Japan
3rd place, bronze medalist(s)	Sandra Weber	Germany
4	Akiko Kira	Japan
5	Jung Young-seon	South Korea
6	Chua Siu Yong	Singapore
7	Han Pill-sun	South Korea
