= Powerlifting at the 2001 World Games =

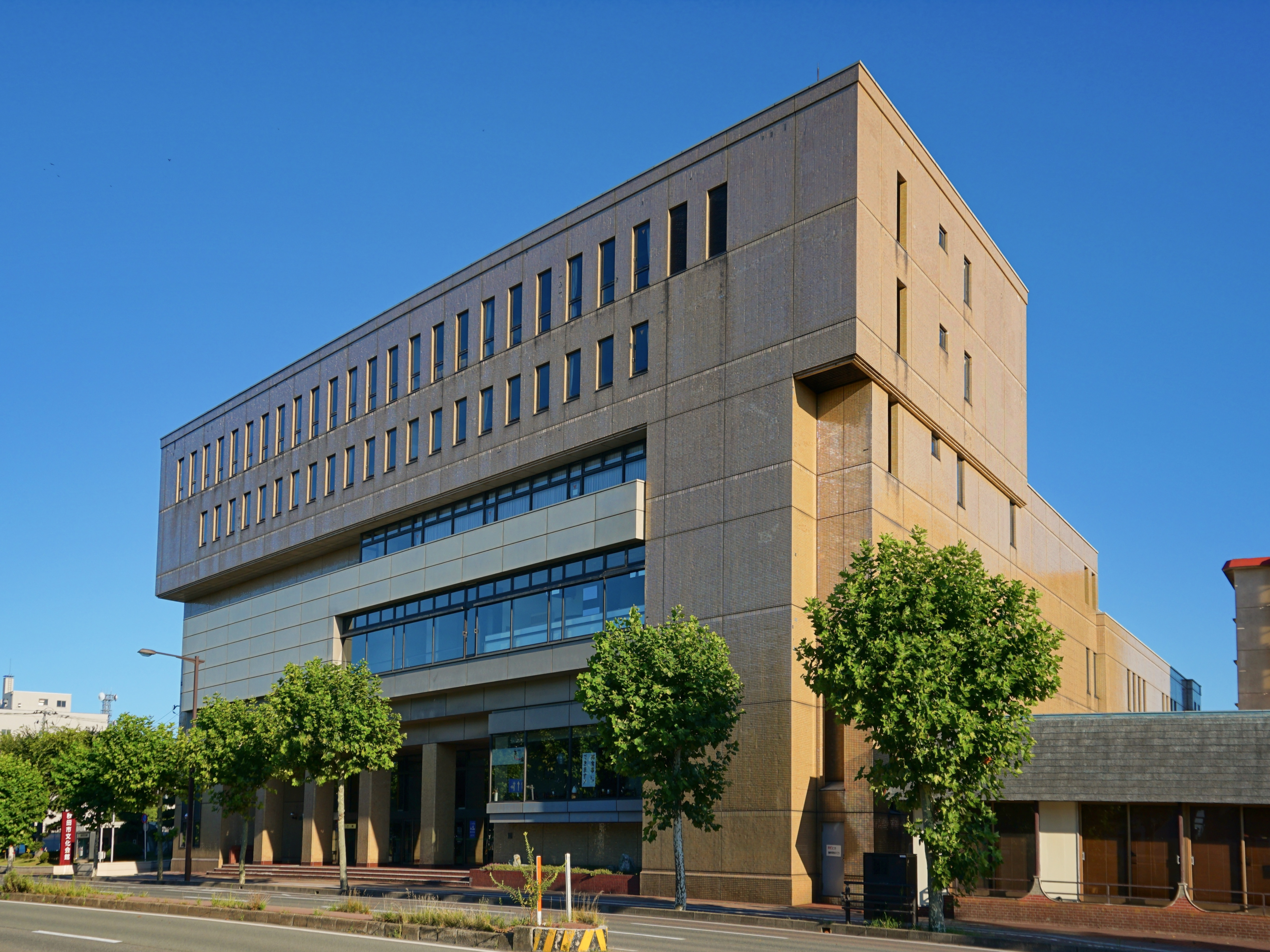
- Akita City Culture Hall
- Venue: Akita City Culture Hall
- Dates: 20–21 August 2001
- Competitors: 66 from 15 nations

The powerlifting events at the 2001 World Games in Akita was played between 20 and 21 August. 66 athletes, from 15 nations, participated in the tournament. The powerlifting competition took place at Akita City Culture Hall.

== Participating nations ==
- Canada (2)
- Chinese Taipei (8)
- Czech Republic (1)
- Finland (2)
- France (1)
- Germany (1)
- Italy (1)
- Japan (12)
- Kazakhstan (2)
- Norway (3)
- Russia (13)
- Sweden (2)
- Ukraine (3)
- United States (14)
- Uzbekistan (1)

== Medal table ==
Rank	Nation	Gold	Silver	Bronze	Total
1	Russia	3	4	2	9
2	Finland	1	0	1	2
2	Japan	1	0	1	2
4	Kazakhstan	1	0	0	1
5	Chinese Taipei	0	1	1	2
6	United States	0	1	0	1
7	Sweden	0	0	1	1
Totals (7 entries)		6	6	6	18

== Events ==
=== Men's events ===
Event	Gold	Silver	Bronze
Lightweight	Alexey Sivokon; Kazakhstan	Konstantin Pavlov; Russia	Mikhail Andryukhin; Russia
Middleweight	Viktor Furazhkin; Russia	Andrey Tarasenko; Russia	Sergey Mor; Russia
Heavyweight	Daisuke Midote; Japan	Brad Gillingham; United States	Jörgen Ljungberg; Sweden

=== Women's events ===
Event	Gold	Silver	Bronze
Lightweight	Raija Koskinen; Finland	Chen Kuan-ting; Chinese Taipei	Yukako Fukushima; Japan
Middleweight	Marina Kudinova; Russia	Irina Abramova; Russia	Pirjo Savola; Finland
Heavyweight	Svetlana Miklashevich; Russia	Natalia Payusova; Russia	Chao Chen-yeh; Chinese Taipei
