= Amy Fadhli =

American model, actor and fitness competitor (born 1965)

- Born: January 30, 1965 (age 61); Galveston, Texas, U.S.
- Spouse: Tito Raymond
- Children: 2
- Modeling information
- Height: 5 ft 5 in (165 cm)
- Hair color: Brown
- Eye color: Hazel

Amy Fadhli (born January 30, 1965) is an American fitness model, actress and winner of the Fitness America National Champion 1996.

== Life and career ==
Fadhli was born on January 30, 1965 in Galveston, Texas. Her father, originally from Baghdad, Iraq, was a sculptor and cardiovascular surgeon and her mother, of Czech descent, was a breeder of Arabian horses. She has a twin brother, an older brother, and an older sister. The family relocated to Port Arthur, Texas, when she was one year old, and spent approximately a year and a half living in the Middle East during her childhood. She currently lives with her husband Tito Raymond and two children.

After qualifying as a dental hygienist and completing college, Fadhli moved to Northern California, where she was introduced to fitness training. She later relocated to Dallas, where she began working as a swimsuit model and competing in bikini contests, winning several titles and prizes. She submitted her portfolio to the Fitness America Pageant and was invited to the national championships, where she won the physique round and placed ninth overall. She returned the following year, placed as first runner-up, and was later named the Fitness America National Champion in 1996.

In addition to her fitness modeling work, Fadhli has appeared in television shows such as The Young and the Restless and numerous films. Her career has included international travel to various places, including Hong Kong, Italy, Germany, Mexico, Guam, Spain, Hungary, Slovakia, Malaysia, Jamaica and Lebanon.

== Filmography ==
- The Lobo Paramilitary Christmas Special (2002)
- The Scorpion King (2002)
- Con Games (2001)
- Heaven & the Suicide King (1998)
- Knock-Off (1998)
- The Devil's Child (1997)

== Quotes ==
- "If you couldn't tell, I'm not a natural blonde".
- "I got my implants when I was 18. I got them for myself because I wanted them not for anybody or anything else."
