= 2018 Mr. Olympia =

IFBB professional bodybuilding competition

- Genre: Professional bodybuilding competition
- Country: United States
- Previous event: 2017 Mr. Olympia
- Next event: 2019 Mr. Olympia
- Organizer: IFBB
- People: Mr. Olympia : Shawn Rhoden 212 Olympia: Flex Lewis; Bikini Olympia: Angelica Teixeira; CP Olympia: Breon Ansley; MP Olympia: Brandon Hendrickson; WP Olympia: Shanique Grant; Fitness Olympia: Whitney Jones Figure Olympia: Cydney Gillon

The 2018 Mr. Olympia contest was a weekend long IFBB professional bodybuilding competition that was held on September 14 to 15, 2018, in Las Vegas, Nevada. This was the 54th Mr. Olympia competition celebrated. The weekend competition is also known as the Joe Weider's Olympia Fitness and Performance Weekend. While the main event was the competition for the title of Mr. Olympia, several other events were held which includes the Amateur competition and sports expo.

On September 12, 2018, a press conference was held on Orleans Arena.

On September 13, 2018, prejudging and finals for Fitness Olympia, Figure Olympia and Classic Physique were held and livestream via Amazon Prime. Mr. Olympia pre-judging was also held on the same night.

On September 15, 2018, the Men's Physique Olympia and Women's Physique Olympia judging and finals were held in the morning at Las Vegas Convention Center. At night, the Bikini Olympia, 212 Olympia and Mr. Olympia finals were held at Orleans Arena.

On September 17, 2018, an Olympia Superstar Seminar was held.

Shawn Rhoden won his first Mr Olympia title, defeating seven-time defending champion Phil Heath.

Heath was attempting to tie the records for the most Mr. Olympia wins overall and most wins in a row with eight, held jointly by Lee Haney (1984–1991) and Ronnie Coleman (1998–2005).

Rhoden became the oldest bodybuilder to win the Mr. Olympia title, at the age of 43 years, 5 months.

== Results ==
Place	Prize	Name	Country	Judging	Finals	Total
1	$400,000	Shawn Rhoden	(Jamaica)	7	6	13
2	$150,000	Phil Heath	(United States)	8	9	17
3	$100,000	Roelly Winklaar	(Curaçao)	12	15	27
4	$55,000	William Bonac	(Netherlands)	20	20	40
5	$45,000	Brandon Curry	(United States)	30	26	56
6	$35,000	Mamdouh Elssbiay	(Egypt)	29	29	58
7	$25,000	Dexter Jackson	(United States)	34	36	70
8	$20,000	Nathan De Asha	(France)	31	41	72
9	$18,000	Cedric McMillan	(United States)	45	44	89
10	$16,000	Steve Kuclo	(United States)	50	50	100
11		Alexis Rivera	(Puerto Rico)	55		55
12		Lukáš Osladil	(Czech Republic)	62		62
13		Charles Griffen	(United States)	63		63
14		Iain Valliere	(Canada)	72		72
15		Michael Lockett	(United States)	74		74

== Other results ==
- Flex Lewis won his 7th consecutive 212 Olympia title, then announced he will no longer compete in the 212 division.
- Angelica Teixeira is the 2018 Bikini Olympia Champion.
- Brandon Hendrickson won the Men's Physique Olympia title.
- Shanique Grant won the Women's Physique Olympia title.
- Breon Ansley won the Classic Physique title for the second consecutive time.
- Whitney Jones won Fitness Olympia title.
- Cydney Gillon won the 2018 Figure Olympia title for the second consecutive time.
