= Cedric McMillan =

American bodybuilder (1977–2022)

- Born: August 17, 1977; Maplewood, New Jersey, U.S.
- Died: April 12, 2022 (aged 44)
- Occupation: United States Army Instructor /IFBB Pro Bodybuilder
- Height: 6 ft 1 in (185 cm)
- Spouse: Patty McMillan
- Children: 4

Cedric Kennan McMillan (August 17, 1977 – April 12, 2022) was an American IFBB professional bodybuilder and United States Army Instructor. His last victory was the 2017 Arnold Classic.

== Statistics ==
- Offseason weight: 295 – 310 lbs (133.8 kg – 140.6 kg)
- Precontest weight: 280 lbs
- Contest weight: 265 lbs (120kg)
- Height: 6’1” (185.42 cm)
- Age: 44 years
- Nationality: American

== Early life and amateur career ==
As a child, McMillan took a real interest in muscular physiques and drew comic characters that had impressive physiques. His idol was 7x Mr. Olympia Arnold Schwarzenegger, who inspired him, especially after seeing Schwarzenegger in Conan The Barbarian. McMillan started training at thirteen after his mother bought him a weight set. It wasn’t long before he learned that he had good genetics for bodybuilding and a passion for the sport.

After high school, McMillan joined the US Army, moving to South Carolina. Not long after, his friend Mark Neil convinced him to enter his first bodybuilding competition. Neil helped McMillan gain a lot of size and learn more about bodybuilding. After Neil saw how McMillan's physique developed after just one month of training, he encouraged McMillan to compete in a bodybuilding show that was only four weeks away. During those four weeks before the competition, he grew from an initial weight of 195 lbs to 225 lbs, competing at 205 lbs. He entered the NPC South Carolina in 2007 and won the super heavyweight division and overall.

== Professional career ==
McMillan was a top open division bodybuilder with 8 Pro wins while placing top 5 in major competitions on several occasions. He earned his Pro card in 2009 and, since, had been in the conversation with the best open bodybuilders in the world.

His most notable victory was the 2017 Arnold Classic Ohio where he got to meet his idol, Arnold Schwarzenegger, earning praise from the former Mr. Olympia. His most recent competition was the 2020 Arnold Classic Ohio where he placed 6th.

== Profile ==
McMillan was renowned for his aesthetic physique which stood out from the larger and blockier mass physiques that dominate the sport. At over 6'1', McMillan stood taller than most competitors and he chose to present a more aesthetic look which he often presented through highly choreographed posing to classical music that reminded many of the great bodybuilders from the 1980s – a real contrast to mass monsters like Ronnie Coleman or Jay Cutler.

With his combination of size, height and aesthetic classic lines, McMillan achieved success, particularly at the Arnold Classic. Indeed, the contrast between his physique and the larger mass monster look of other competitors such as Phil Heath led to calls by Arnold Schwarzenegger to rein in the waistlines of bodybuilders on the IFBB stage.

However, despite setting the bar for a newer, more appealing look in the sport, McMillan was generally considered to have underperformed at the Mr Olympia finals, which often rewards the largest, most muscular physiques, placing the taller McMillan at a disadvantage. This is also a challenge that has been faced by bodybuilders of a similar physique and stature, such as Evan Centopani and Patrick Moore.

== Personal life ==
McMillan resided in Columbia, South Carolina, where he was a sergeant first class and an instructor at Fort Jackson, SC. He described himself as a family man and was still close friends with his childhood friends. An amateur artist talented in drawing with an interest in music and culture, McMillan often showcased his artistic talents in highly elaborate and highly choreographed posing routines.

McMillan died of a heart attack on April 12, 2022, at the age of 44.

== Competition history ==
Year	Event	Place
2020	Arnold Classic Columbus	6
2019	Japan Pro	2
2019	Romania Muscle Fest Pro	1
2019	Fitparade Hungary Pro - Grand Prix	1
2019	Mr. Olympia	7
2019	Arnold Classic Australia	2
2019	Arnold Classic	4
2018	Mr. Olympia	9
2018	Toronto Pro	3
2018	Arnold Classic	3
2017	Center Podium Ferrigno Legacy	2
2017	Mr. Olympia	10
2017	Arnold Classic	1
2016	Mr. Olympia	7
2016	Arnold Classic Australia	2
2016	Arnold Classic	2
2016	Levrone Pro Classic	1
2015	Nordic Pro	3
2015	Europa Atlantic City Pro	2
2015	Golden State Pro	1
2015	Arnold Classic South America	2
2015	Arnold Classic	4
2014	Arnold Classic	3
2013	Mr. Olympia	12
2013	New York Pro	12
2013	FIBO Power Germany	1
2013	Arnold Classic	6
2012	New York Pro	1
2011	Europa Orlando Pro	1
2011	New York Pro	11
2010	Europa Dallas Pro	4
2009	NPC National Championships	1
2008	NPC Junior USA Championships	1

== See also ==
- Brandon Curry
- Mamdouh Elssbiay
- Roelly Winklaar
