= Qatar at the 2017 World Games =

- IOC code: QAT

in Wrocław, Poland 20 July 2017 – 30 July 2017
- Medals Ranked 57th: Gold 0 Silver 0 Bronze 1 Total 1

World Games appearances (overview)
- 1981; 1985; 1989; 1993; 1997; 2001; 2005; 2009; 2013; 2017; 2022; 2025

Qatar competed at the 2017 World Games held in Wrocław, Poland.

== Medalists ==
Medal	Name	Sport	Event
Bronze	Men's team	Beach handball	Men's tournament

== Beach handball ==
The men's team won the bronze medal in the men's tournament.
