= Qatar at the World Games =

- IOC code: QAT
- Medals: Gold 1 Silver 2 Bronze 1 Total 4

World Games appearances (overview)
- 1981; 1985; 1989; 1993; 1997; 2001; 2005; 2009; 2013; 2017; 2022

Qatar competed at several editions of the World Games.

== History ==
In 2005, Qatar won its first medal at the World Games in Duisburg, Germany and both medals were won in bodybuilding. In 2009, Kamal Abdulsalam Abdulrahman won a medal in bodybuilding at the 2009 World Games but he was stripped of his medal in 2011 after testing positive for a banned substance. Eight years later, at the 2017 World Games held in Wrocław, Poland, Qatar won a bronze medal in beach handball. At the 2022 World Games, the country won the silver medal in the men's beach handball tournament.

== Medal count ==
Games	Gold	Silver	Bronze	Total
(Germany) 2005 Duisburg	1	1	0	2
(Chinese Taipei) 2009 Kaohsiung	0	0	0	0
(Poland) 2017 Wrocław	0	0	1	1
(United States) 2022 Birmingham	0	1	0	1
Totals (4 entries)	1	2	1	4
