= Bodybuilding at the 2005 World Games =

International sporting competition

- Venue: TAM Theatre
- Dates: 16–17 July 2005
- Competitors: 48 from 25 nations

The bodybuilding events at the 2005 World Games in Duisburg were held between 16 and 17 July. 48 athletes, from 25 nations, participated in the tournament. The bodybuilding competition took place in TAM Theatre.

== Participating nations ==
- Austria (1)
- Bahrain (1)
- Brazil (2)
- China (3)
- Czech Republic (4)
- Egypt (3)
- Estonia (1)
- Finland (1)
- Germany (8)
- Guam (1)
- Hong Kong (2)
- Hungary (1)
- India (1)
- Italy (1)
- Japan (2)
- South Korea (1)
- Latvia (1)
- Lithuania (1)
- Poland (2)
- Qatar (2)
- Russia (1)
- Samoa (1)
- Singapore (3)
- Slovakia (3)
- Ukraine (1)

== Medal table ==
| Rank | Nation | Gold | Silver | Bronze | Total |
|---|---|---|---|---|---|
| 1 | Slovakia (SVK) | 1 | 2 | 0 | 3 |
| 2 | Germany (GER) | 1 | 1 | 3 | 5 |
| 3 | Poland (POL) | 1 | 1 | 0 | 2 |
| 3 | Qatar (QAT) | 1 | 1 | 0 | 2 |
| 5 | Brazil (BRA) | 1 | 0 | 1 | 2 |
| 5 | Egypt (EGY) | 1 | 0 | 1 | 2 |
| 7 | Ukraine (UKR) | 1 | 0 | 0 | 1 |
| 8 | Bahrain (BRN) | 0 | 1 | 0 | 1 |
| 8 | Hong Kong (HKG) | 0 | 1 | 0 | 1 |
| 10 | China (CHN) | 0 | 0 | 1 | 1 |
| 10 | Italy (ITA) | 0 | 0 | 1 | 1 |
| Totals (11 entries) | | 7 | 7 | 7 | 21 |

== Events ==
=== Men ===
| Event | Gold | Silver | Bronze |
|---|---|---|---|
| 70 kg | José Carlos Santos; Brazil | Kamil Majek; Poland | Anwar El-Amawy; Egypt |
| 75 kg | Werner Zenk; Germany | Igor Kočiš; Slovakia | Corrado Maggiore; Italy |
| 80 kg | Juraj Vrábel; Slovakia | Andreas Becker; Germany | Luiz Carlos Sarmento; Brazil |
| 85 kg | Kamal Abdulsalam; Qatar | Tareq Al-Farsani; Bahrain | Frank Schramm; Germany |
| +85 kg | El-Shahat Mabrouk; Egypt | Ali Tabrizi; Qatar | Thomas Scheu; Germany |

=== Women ===
| Event | Gold | Silver | Bronze |
|---|---|---|---|
| 52 kg | Iryna Petrenko; Ukraine | Lo Kit Ming; Hong Kong | Cao Xinli; China |
| +52 kg | Agnieszka Ryk; Poland | Aurélia Grožajová; Slovakia | Simone Linay; Germany |
