= Bodybuilding at the 1981 World Games =

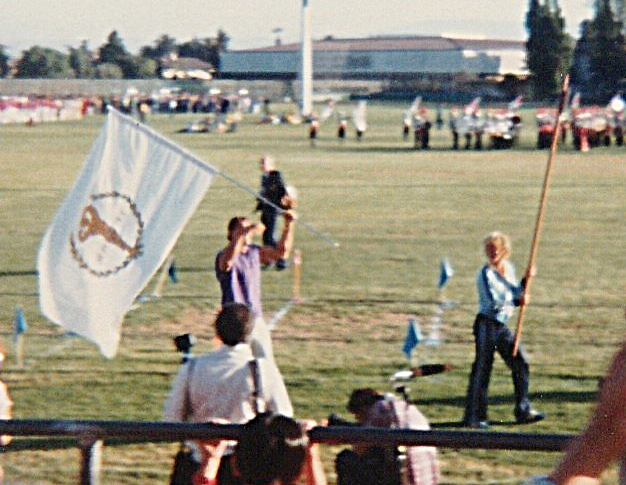
Arnold Schwarzenegger, winner of seven consecutive world championships, carries the flag of the International Federation of Bodybuilders in the opening ceremony of World Games I in 1981 at Santa Clara University, California.

Medal events in both men's (4) and women's (2) bodybuilding were included in World Games I. They were held on July 30–31, 1981, at the San Jose Center for the Performing Arts in San Jose, California. The 1981 Games were the first World Games, an international quadrennial multi-sport event, and were held in California's Santa Clara Valley. In the bodybuilding competition, the preliminary rounds featured two-on-two competition. Point scoring was based on mandatory posing (front, back and side poses) and optional posing determined by the athlete. 26 of the countries at these Games participated in bodybuilding, making it one of the most represented sports.

== Medalists ==
Event	Gold	Silver	Bronze
Men
Heavyweight	John Kemper (USA)	Wayne Robbins (CAN)	Achmed Ibrahim (EGY)
Light-heavyweight	Jacques Neuville (FRA)	Jesse Gautreaux (USA)	Keijo Reiman (FIN)
Middleweight	James Youngblood (USA)	Billy Knight (AUS)	Erwin Note (BEL)
Lightweight	Renato Bertagna (ITA)	Esmat Sadek (EGY)	Joseph Disinti (USA)
Women
Middleweight	Kike Elomaa (FIN)	Gail Schroeter (USA)	Deborah Diana (USA)
Lightweight	Pam Brooks (USA)	Josee Baumgartner (FRA)	Christine Reed (USA)

== Results ==
Men's–Lightweight

Rank	Athlete	Nation
1st place, gold medalist(s)	Renato Bertagna	Italy
2nd place, silver medalist(s)	Esmat Sadek	Egypt
3rd place, bronze medalist(s)	Joseph Disinti	United States
4	Harry Derglin	Switzerland
5	Ralph Lopez	Puerto Rico
6	Guillermo Franco	Guatemala
7	Katsumi Ishimura	Japan
8	Luis Guzman	Puerto Rico

Men's–Middleweight

Rank	Athlete	Nation
1st place, gold medalist(s)	James Youngblood	United States
2nd place, silver medalist(s)	Billy Knight	Australia
3rd place, bronze medalist(s)	Erwin Note	Belgium
4	Ray Beaulieu	Canada
5	Lucien Gunther	Netherlands
6	Michel Dermaux	Belgium
7 (tie)	Paijo Bin Jemadi	Malaysia
7 (tie)	Teh Ah Fook	Malaysia
9	Vicente Segovia	Spain
10	Michael Hekel	Switzerland
11	Moloy Roy	India

Men's–Light-Heavyweight

Rank	Athlete	Nation
1st place, gold medalist(s)	Jacques Neuville	France
2nd place, silver medalist(s)	Jesse Gautreaux	United States
3rd place, bronze medalist(s)	Keijo Reiman	Finland
4	Ulf Bengtsson	Sweden
5	Osamu Usui	Japan
6	Cesar Lopez	Mexico
7	L.K. Adhikary	India
8	...	

Men's–Heavyweight

Rank	Athlete	Nation
1st place, gold medalist(s)	John Kemper	United States
2nd place, silver medalist(s)	Wayne Robbins	Canada
3rd place, bronze medalist(s)	Achmed Ibrahim	Egypt
4	Manfred Grossler	Austria
5	Rolando Pintoy	Philippines
6	...	

Women's–Lightweight

Rank	Athlete	Nation
1st place, gold medalist(s)	Pam Brooks	United States
2nd place, silver medalist(s)	Josee Baumgartner	France
3rd place, bronze medalist(s)	Christine Reed	United States
4	Debbie Trenholm	United States
5	Jacqueline Roos	Netherlands
6	Kathy Basacker	United States
7	Josiane Jamar	Belgium
8	Stella Martinez	United States
9	Dagmar Zuso	Switzerland
9 (?)	Susan Roberts	United States
11	Sue Tonks	England
12	Carla York	United States
13	Terri Miladinovich	United States
14	Milda Graham	Canada
15	Kathleen Cosentino	United States
16	Kathy Tuite	United States
17	Michelle Tennier	Canada
18	Wendy Daniels	Canada
19	Claudine Turin	Switzerland
20	Terri Buhne	Australia

Women's–Middleweight

Rank	Athlete	Nation
1st place, gold medalist(s)	Kike Elomaa	Finland
2nd place, silver medalist(s)	Gail Schroeter	United States
3rd place, bronze medalist(s)	Deborah Diana	United States
4	Carla Dunlap	United States
5	Kay Baxter-Wick	United States
6	Shelley Gruwell	United States
7	Linda McCrerey	United States
8	Joanne Cameron	United States
9	Vera Cools	Belgium
10	Carole Bennett	Australia
11	Lynne Bergmame	Canada
12	Marlene Fuhrer	Switzerland
13	Leia Kawaii	United States
14	Monika Chevalley	Switzerland

Other competitors expected prior to Games – United States: Madeline Almeida, Susan Bressler, Gary Leonard, Ernie Santiago, Richard Baldin, John Burkholder; Singapore: Moh Teck Hin
