= Ritva Elomaa =

Finnish bodybuilder and politician (born 1955)

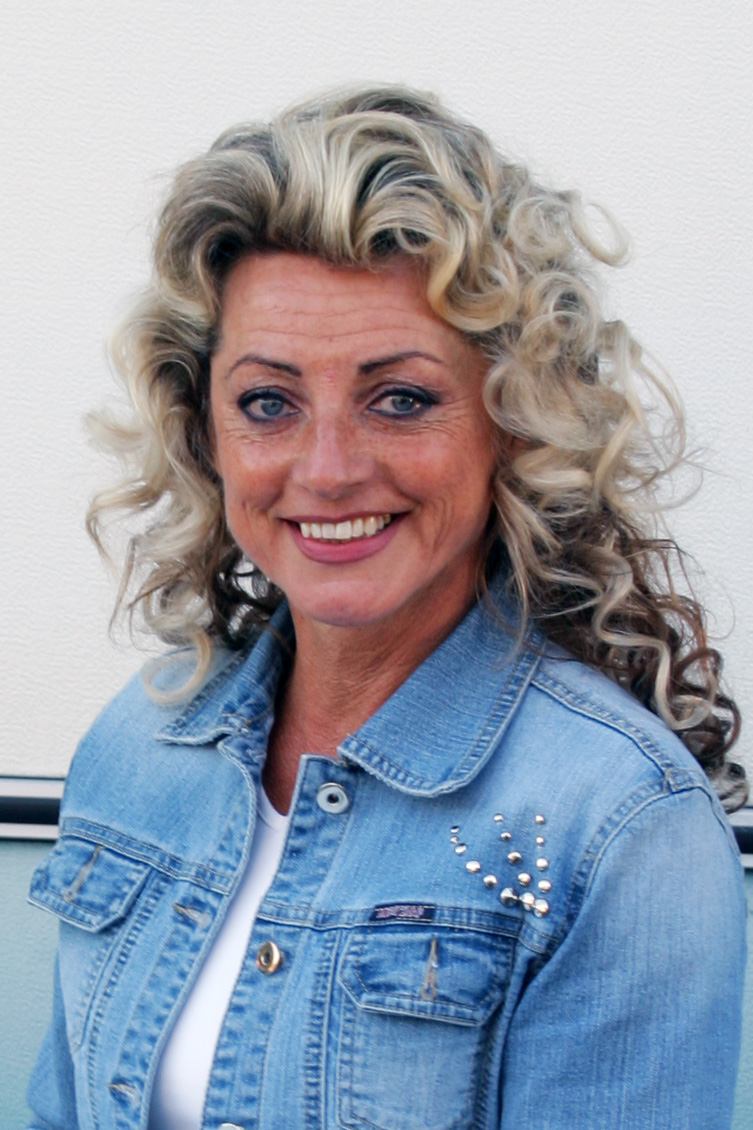

Member of Finnish Parliament for Finland Proper
- Incumbent
- Assumed office 20 April 2011

Personal details
- Born: Ritva Sainio; 16 July 1955 (age 71) Lokalahti, Southwest Finland, Finland
- Party: Finns Party
- Spouse: Married
- Website: KikeElomaa.com
- Professional bodybuilder

Personal info
- Nickname: Kike

Best statistics
- Height: 5 ft 5 in (165 cm)
- Weight: 117 lb (53 kg)

Professional (Pro) career
- Pro-debut: IFBB Ms. Olympia; 1981
- Best win: IFBB Ms. Olympia champion; 1981
- Predecessor: Rachel McLish
- Successor: Rachel McLish
- Active: Retired 1983
Medal record
Women's bodybuilding
Representing Finland
World Games
Gold medal – first place	1981 Santa Clara	Middleweight

Ritva Tuulikki "Kike" Elomaa (née Sainio; born 16 July 1955, in Lokalahti) is a Finnish professional female bodybuilding champion, pop singer, and member of the Finnish Parliament.

== Early life and education ==
Elomaa was born in Lokalahti, Finland in 1955. She matriculated from Mynämäki gymnasium in 1975 and graduated from Helsinki Nursing School as radiographer in 1980.

== Bodybuilding career ==
=== Professional ===
In 1981, Elomaa defeated Rachel McLish at the IFBB Ms. Olympia. Following her wildly successful contest campaign in 1981, she competed only three more times, placing third at the 1982 IFBB Ms. Olympia and second at the 1983 IFBB Pro Worlds. Elomaa ended her career on stage after a fifth-place finish at the 1983 IFBB Ms. Olympia.

=== Legacy ===
Currently Elomaa is the most successful Finnish bodybuilder of all time. She was the only non-American to win the Ms. Olympia title until 2000. She was inducted into the IFBB Hall of Fame in 2001. She has also been awarded the IFBB's President's Gold Medal for her work in supporting the sport of bodybuilding. A fitness contest, the Elomaa Fitness Championship, is held annually in Finland.

=== Contest history ===
- 1981 Finnish Championships – 1st
- 1981 European Championships – 1st
- 1981 World Games – 1st (Middleweight Women)
- 1981 IFBB Ms. Olympia – 1st
- 1982 IFBB Ms. Olympia – 3rd
- 1983 Pro World Championship – 2nd
- 1983 IFBB Ms. Olympia – 5th

== Parliament of Finland ==
=== 2011 election ===
On 17 April 2011, Elomaa was elected into Finnish parliament for the 2011–2015 term, representing the electoral district of Finland Proper as a member of the Finns Party.

On 13 June 2017, Elomaa and 19 others left the Finns Party parliamentary group to found the New Alternative parliamentary group. However, on 22 June, she left the group and re-joined the Finns Party.

Ms. Olympia
Preceded by: Rachel McLish	First (1981)	Succeeded by: Rachel McLish
