= Powerlifting at the 2005 World Games – Men's middleweight =

2005 powerlifting world championship

Powerlifting men's middleweight at the 2005 World Games
- Venue: Rheinhausenhalle, Duisburg, Germany
- Date: 17 July 2005
- Competitors: 10 from 7 nations

Medalists
gold medal	(Russia) Andrey Tarasenko
silver medal	(Russia) Viktor Furazhkin
bronze medal	(Poland) Jan Wegiera

The men's middleweight competition in powerlifting at the 2005 World Games took place on 17 July 2005 at the Rheinhausenhalle in Duisburg, Germany.

== Competition format ==
A total of 10 athletes entered the competition. Each athlete had 3 attempts in each of 3 events: squat, bench press and deadlift. The athlete with the biggest score in Wilks points is the winner.

== Results ==
Rank	Athlete	Nation	Weight	Squat	Bench press	Deadlift	Total weight	Total points
1st place, gold medalist(s)	Andrey Tarasenko	Russia	89.10	365.0	247.5	345.0	957.5	614.42
2nd place, silver medalist(s)	Viktor Furazhkin	Russia	74.90	320.0	217.5	322.5	860.0	613.35
3rd place, bronze medalist(s)	Jan Wegiera	Poland	84.75	340.0	262.5	300.0	902.5	595.15
4	Wade Hooper	United States	74.80	335.0	232.5	260.0	827.5	590.75
5	Michał Wilk	Poland	89.80	355.0	230.0	310.0	895.0	571.99
6	Davran Turakhanov	Kazakhstan	76.55	310.0	185.0	312.5	807.5	567.34
7	Ray Benemerito	United States	89.45	322.5	210.0	295.0	827.5	529.93
8	Petrus Erasmus	South Africa	90.00	300.0	232.5	280.0	812.5	518.70
9	Marco Sura	Germany	86.65	300.0	190.0	280.0	770.0	501.50
	Petr Theuser	Czech Republic	89.90	340.0	222.5	NM	DSQ	DSQ
