= Luke Sandoe =

- Born: c. 1989; Bournemouth, Dorset, England
- Died: 7 May 2020 (aged 30)
- Occupations: IFBB Pro / UKBFF Pro Bodybuilder, physique coach, musician
- Height: 5 ft 7 in (170 cm)

Luke Sandoe (c. 1989 – 7 May 2020) was a British IFBB and UKBFF professional bodybuilder, physique coach and former musician. He competed in the super heavyweight category. His last victory was the 2016 UKBFF Overall British championships.

== Early life and amateur career ==
Sandoe was born in 1989 in Bournemouth. A self-described "stocky and fairly muscular" youth, Sandoe was immensely athletic. During his youth, Sandoe read comic books from which he was deeply inspired to begin bodybuilding. His inspiration led him to attain a physique similar to those of the superheroes he frequently saw.

After concluding a brief music career as a drummer at age 22, Sandoe returned to bodybuilding and pursued the sport on a full-time basis. He won two regional championships in the Over 100kg category.

== Professional career ==
Between the ages of 22 and 23, Sandoe won his debut competition at the 2012 South Coast Juniors show. He won his professional status after his victory at the 2016 UKBFF British Championships. He went on to place in the top 10 at the 2017 and 2018 Arnold Classic events. Sandoe also placed just under the top 10 finalists at the 2019 Mr. Olympia.

== Death ==
It was reported on 7 May 2020 that Sandoe passed away at age 30. The cause of death was not disclosed. He was a father and is survived by his family.

== Statistics ==
- Offseason weight: 255 lbs (116 kg)
- Contest weight: 245 lbs (111 kg)
- Height: 5'7" (170cm)
- Age: 30 years
- Nationality: British

== Competition history ==
- 2015 UKBFF British Championships – 6th place
- 2015 UKBFF Kent Classic Championships – 2nd place
- 2016 UKBFF Overall British Championships - 1st place
- 2017 Arnold Classic – 8th place
- 2018 Arnold Classic Australia – 6th place
- 2019 Mr. Olympia - 11th place
