= Christine Emerson Reed Park =

Park in Santa Monica, California

Coordinates: 34°01′21″N 118°29′45″W

- Interactive map of Christine Emerson Reed Park
- Location: 1133 7th st.
- Nearest city: Santa Monica, California
- Operator: Santa Monica Community Services Department

Christine Emerson Reed Park, formerly known as Lincoln Park, is a park in Santa Monica, California. The park sits between 7th street and Lincoln Boulevard and between Wilshire Boulevard and California Avenue. Renamed in November 1997 to honor the late mayor and city council member, Christine Reed, the park was dedicated on June 14, 1998.

It is home to the Miles Memorial Playhouse, tennis courts, and the city's tennis office, basketball courts, a playground, and CREST after school program. The park has three chess tables, but no pieces are provided. One table is specifically designated for wheelchair accessibility. The Park’s amenities include: CREST & Youth Programs Office, Miles Memorial Playhouse, 2 basketball courts, 1 fenced children's playground (ages 2-5 and 5-12), 6 tennis courts with lights, public restrooms, free wi-fi, multipurpose Room, metered street parking only.

The park is best known for being the source of the name of the band Linkin Park. A petition was started by fans to rename the park after Linkin Park's frontman Chester Bennington, who died in 2017. The park instead put in a memorial plaque, dedicated to him. It reads "When life leaves us blind, love keeps us kind", a lyric from 'The Messenger, off of A Thousand Suns.
