= Moe Irvin =

American actor

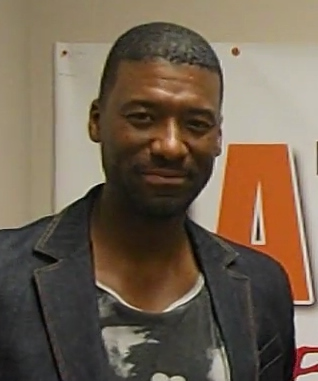
Irvin in 2016

Maurice "Moe" Irvin is an American television and film actor best known for his role as Nurse Tyler Christian in the medical drama Grey's Anatomy.

Aside from his recurring role in Grey's Anatomy, he has had minor appearances in the television series Alias, In Justice and V.I.P., as well as in the films Killer Weekend, The Human Quality, Con Games, The Helix... Loaded, Hush: A Film by Eva Minemar, Bulldog and Shakedown.

Additionally, he appeared on stage in "Our Lady of 121st Street" premier in L.A. 2006–7.

== Filmography ==
=== Film ===
Year	Title	Role	Notes
2000	The Human Quality	Alien	Direct-to-video
2001	Con Games	Eddie Long	Direct-to-video
2002	Bulldog	Kidd	
2002	Shakedown	J	Direct-to-video
2005	The Helix...Loaded	Tyrone	
2007	Killer Weekend	Bo	Direct-to-video
2007	Hush: A Film by Eva Minemar	Husband	Short film
2008	Hummingbird	Michael	Short film
2010	Santa Preys for X-Mas	Detective Jones	Short film
2011	Wacko Jacko	Marvin	Short film Also writer and director
2013	Casting	Dan Ashley	Short film
2014	Tarot: A Documentary Love Story	Llord	
2014	As Night Comes	Mr. Hayes	
2014	Stanford & Son	Landon Stanford	Short film Also writer, director and producer
2015	Dutch Book	Big Country	
2015	7 Days	Matty	
2016	A Winter Rose	Rock	
2017	For Blood	Ben	Short film
2017	Da Capo	Xavier	Short film

=== Television ===
Year	Title	Role	Notes
2001	Alias	Man in the Couple	Episode: "Mea Culpa"
2002	V.I.P.	Flea	Episode: "48 1/2 Hours"
2005–2014	Grey's Anatomy	Nurse Tyler Christian	29 episodes
2006	In Justice	Errol Fisher	Episode: "Side Man"
2008, 2010	CSI: NY	Melvin La Grange / DEA Agent Dewey	2 episodes
2009	The Bo-Bo & Skippy Show	Flipzo	1 episode
2010	NCIS: Los Angeles	Tommy Bishop	Episode: "Human Traffic"
2011	The Event	Anthony	Episode: "A Message Back"
2011	Death Interrupted	Jazzhead	Television film
2015	Scandal	Max Butler	Episode: "Honor Thy Father"
2015	Wacko Smacko	Stephen	3 episodes
2015	Gortimer Gibbon's Life on Normal Street	Phil	Episode: "Gortimer and the Vengeful Violinist"
2016	Pure Genius	Ron Evans	Episode: "Pilot"
2016	Send Me: An Original Web Series	Phillip	4 episodes
2017	Small Shots	Detective	Episode: "This. Is. My. Life."
2017	Versus		4 episodes
2017, 2019	Snowfall	Santos	7 episodes
2018	Criminal Minds	Chief Thomas Wheeler	Episode: "Miasma"
2018	Unsolved: The Murders of Tupac and the Notorious B.I.G.	Kevin Hackie	Episode: "The Art of War"
2018	NCIS	Commander Daly	Uncredited Episode: "Date with Destiny"
2018	Five Points	Frank	Episode: "Everybody Knows"
2019	Chicago Fire	Hollander	Episode: "Inside These Walls"
2019	The Chadwick Journals	Darnell's Father	Episode: "The Letter"
2019	Mad About You	Fantasy Coffee Husband	Episode: "Anderson Cooper and Other Fantasies"
2020	Them: Covenant	Roland Johnson	1 episode
2023	Ahsoka	Senator Mawood	2 episodes
2026	Nemesis	Amos ‘Nightmare’ Stiles	6 episodes
