= Frank McGrath (bodybuilder) =

Canadian IFBB professional bodybuilder (born 1978)

- Professional bodybuilder

Personal info
- Born: August 9, 1978 (age 47); St. John's, Newfoundland and Labrador

Best statistics
- Height: 5 ft 11 in (1.801 m)
- Weight: (In Season) 235 – 255lb (Off-Season) 300 lb

Francis McGrath (born August 9, 1978, in St. John's, Newfoundland and Labrador) is a Canadian IFBB professional bodybuilder and model.

McGrath is perhaps best known for his association with the ANIMAL fitness brand, becoming essentially the face of the brand from 2003 - 2018. McGrath suffered a set-back in the form of a car accident but has since recovered and competed professionally again.

== Athlete Statistics ==
- Weight (offseason) - 280 - 300lbs
- Weight (precontest) -235 – 255lbs (106.6 – 115.1kg)
- Height - 5’11” (180.34 cm)
- Waist - 28 inches
- Age - 42 years
- Nationality- Canadian
- Era- 2000s, 2010s

== Early life ==
Frank McGrath was born in St. John's, Newfoundland and Labrador, Canada. As a teenager he became fascinated with the 7x Mr. Olympia icon and actor, Arnold Schwarzenegger. McGrath was a skinny and undersized child compared to his classmates at the time and would always get picked last to be on teams during physical activities, which led him to begin weight training.

== Competitive career ==
He began training at 14 in his parents' basement with a basic setup and after three years could bench press 300 pounds. Then he went to university at 18 and used his student loans to compete in his first bodybuilding competition (2000 Newfoundland Championships) which he won overall. In his early 20s, McGrath had competed in a few other shows and eventually earned his Pro card in 2003 at age 25.

McGrath started competing in the early 2000s and a few years later earned Pro status after winning the superheavyweight and overall at the CBBF Canadian Championships. He completely dominated this contest having won his category with just the first call-out. McGrath earned this victory after just seven weeks of preparation. That same year McGrath won a sponsorship with Universal Nutrition, becoming the face of the company's nascent ANIMAL brand- a hardcore supplement, gear and apparel brand aimed at bodybuilders, powerlifters and fitness enthusiasts. As a result McGrath, appeared in numerous campaigns in magazines such as Muscle and Fitness, Flex magazine, Men's Health and Men's Fitness, Sports Illustrated, amongst others. This made McGrath one of the most recognizable bodybuilders of the 2000s and 2010s, despite an uneven professional record.

=== ANIMAL Training Series ===
In 2008, Universal Nutrition, released the Animal Training Series, a five volume series, featuring just Frank McGrath, training in a non descript, low frills gymnasium. The series includes volumes on chest, back, 'delts' (shoulders), arms and legs, filmed in black and white, with minimal sound in a fly on the wall style. At the time there was little footage of the Canadian, on video showing him working out, let alone speaking, either on the internet or in any other DVD, as his public image has been almost entirely limited to ANIMAL's minimalist, but omnipresent advertisements in fitness magazines. This created great demand by the time the series was released, boosting the ANIMAL brands popularity and catapulting McGrath to a level of interest that crossed over from bodybuilding to more mainstream fitness, sport and wellness media. The series remains well regarded by fitness enthusiasts to this day. Moreover, the stills of Frank in the DVD further added to his popularity, as they became posters in themselves, symbolic of ANIMAL's minimalist, old school aesthetic.

McGrath is widely recognized for his highly developed chest, arms and forearms, in addition to his recognizable vascularity. These attributes, as well as Animal's minimalist black and white advertisements, made him an in-demand fitness model during the 2010s. This is mostly down to his genetics but, as an IFBB pro, he has put in a lot of effort to build his physique.

McGrath initially showed a lot of promise with his impressive proportions competing in several more shows but unfortunately, suffered multiple injuries and was involved in a car crash several years later which led him to take an extended hiatus from competition, effectively retiring by 2018.

== Recent endeavours ==
In 2018, McGrath moved from California to Toronto, and shortly after announced he would be leaving the Animal brand after 15 years as the face of the brand. Aside from starting a YouTube channel and a large following on Instagram, McGrath is now working with the companies; Redcon1, HD Muscle, and Ironbull Strength, in addition to a partnership with a gym in the Greater Toronto Area. He plans to start his own brand, Wrath Army, as well focus on personal training.

== Competition history ==
- 2000 Newfoundland Championships: Heavyweight & Overall – 1st
- 2001 Canadian Championships: Superheavyweight- 6th
- 2003 Canadian Championships: Superheavyweight & Overall – 1st
- 2004 Toronto Pro Invitational – 12th
- 2009 IFBB Tampa Bay Pro Open – 9th
- 2011 IFBB Tampa Bay Pro Open – 3rd
- 2011 IFBB Toronto Pro Invitational Open – 4th
- 2011 Mr. Olympia – 16th
- 2011 IFBB Pro Bodybuilding Weekly Championships – 3rd
- 2013 IFBB Toronto Pro Supershow – 4th
- 2015 IFBB Ferrigno Legacy – 6th

== See also ==
- Evan Centopani
- Beefcake
- List of male professional bodybuilders
