= Bodybuilding at the 1997 World Games =

Bodybuilding competition

Bodybuilding at the 1997 World Games took part between 8 and 9 August 1997 at the Lahti City Theater in Lahti, Finland. It consisted of nine events, three events for women and three for men.

== Medal table ==
Rank	Nation	Gold	Silver	Bronze	Total
1	Germany (GER)	2	1	1	4
2	Japan (JPN)	2	0	0	2
3	United States (USA)	1	2	0	3
4	Egypt (EGY)	1	1	1	3
5	Austria (AUT)	1	0	0	1
5	South Korea (KOR)	1	0	0	1
5	Switzerland (SUI)	1	0	0	1
8	Finland (FIN)	0	4	2	6
9	Liechtenstein (LIE)	0	1	0	1
10	Brazil (BRA)	0	0	1	1
10	Hungary (HUN)	0	0	1	1
10	Lithuania (LTU)	0	0	1	1
Totals (12 entries)		9	9	7	25

== Medalists ==
=== Men ===
Event	Gold	Silver	Bronze
65 kg	(Egypt) Anwar el-Amawy	(Egypt) Mohamed Abdel el-Aziz	(Brazil) José Carlos Santos
70 kg	(Japan) Toshiko Hirota	(United States) Chris Faildo	
75 kg	(South Korea) Kim Jun-Ho	(Finland) Juha Hakala	(Egypt) Ahmed al-Sayed
80 kg	(Germany) Kester Pasche	(United States) Johnny Steward	(Finland) Yrjö Jokela
90 kg	(United States) Milton Holloway	(Germany) Ingo Fischer	(Hungary) Janos Lantos
+ 90 kg	(Austria) Walter Lettner	(Finland) Peter Keränen	(Lithuania) Olegas Zuras

=== Women ===
Event	Gold	Silver	Bronze
52 kg	(Japan) Utako Mizuma	(Finland) Katja Rydström	(Germany) Heike Jung
57 kg	(Switzerland) Barbara Furer	(Liechtenstein) Rita Rinner	
+ 57 kg	(Germany) Michaela Baumer	(Finland) Pauliina Kosola	(Finland) Anne Oksanen
