= Gene Howell =

American bodybuilder

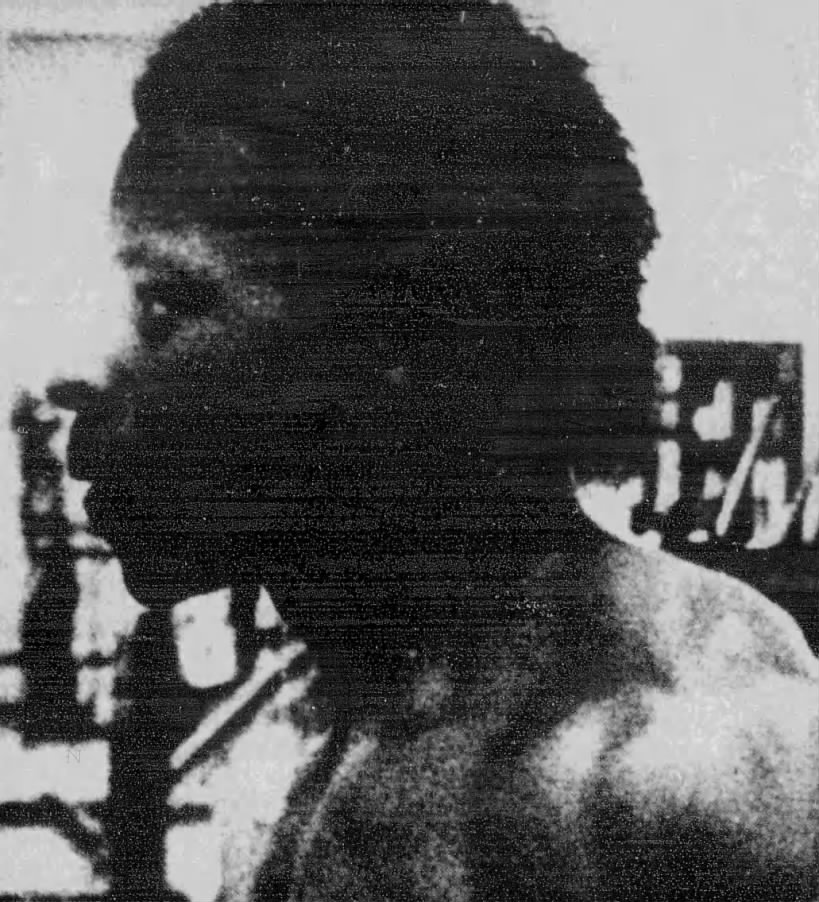
- Howell in 1988

Personal information
- Born: 1962 or 1963 (age 63–64)
- Children: 2

Sport
- Country: United States
- Sport: Bodybuilding
Medal record
Men's bodybuilding
Representing United States
World Games
Bronze medal – third place	1993 The Hague	+80 kg

Gene Howell (born 1962/1963) is an American bodybuilder. He competed at the 1993 World Games, winning the bronze medal in the men's +80 kg event.
