= Johnny Kemper =

American actor and bodybuilder

Personal information
- Born: John A. Kemper; July 31, 1944 Newark, New Jersey, U.S.
- Died: June 13, 2012 (aged 67) Morristown, New Jersey, U.S.
- Spouse: Shirley Corke

Sport
- Country: United States
- Sport: Bodybuilding
Medal record
Men's bodybuilding
Representing United States
World Games
Gold medal – first place	1981 Santa Clara	Heavyweight

John A. Kemper (July 31, 1944 – June 13, 2012) was an American actor and bodybuilder. He competed at the 1981 World Games, winning the gold medal in the men's +80 kg event. Aside from his bodybuilding career, he was the owner of the Diamond Gym, which he sold in 2007.

Kemper died at the Morristown Medical Center in Morristown, New Jersey on June 13, 2012, at the age of 67.

== Selected filmography ==
- Surfari (1967)
- Women in Revolt (1971)
