= Evan Centopani =

American professional bodybuilder (born 1981)

- Professional bodybuilder

Personal info
- Born: April 7, 1981 (age 45); Bridgeport, Connecticut, U.S.

Best statistics
- Height: 5 ft 10.5 in (179 cm)
- Weight: contest: 260 lb (118 kg); Off contest: 300 lb (136 kg)

Professional (Pro) career
- Pro-debut: NPC Atlantic States Championships; 2009
- Best win: IFBB Los Angeles Pro; 2011
- Active: 2009–2022

Evan Michael Centopani (born April 7, 1981) is an American personal trainer, nutritionist, and retired professional bodybuilder who competed in the superheavyweight class. While he has never won the IFBB Mr. Olympia title, he is considered one of the most prominent and successful bodybuilders of the 2010s.

== Background ==
Centopani was born, in Bridgeport, Connecticut, during his childhood, he was burdened with weight problems and reached 220 pounds by the time he was 12. As a teen, Centopani took up running in order to lose weight, dropping 80lbs from running before picking up weight training.

== Athlete Statistics ==
- Height : 5 ft 10.5 in (1.79 m)
- Contest : 260lbs (118 kg)
- Off Season : 300lbs (136 kg)
- Arms: 22 inches
- Quadriceps/Hamstrings (Thighs): 30 inches
- Calves: 19 inches

== Amateur career ==
Evan did not decide to pursue bodybuilding as a potential career until he was 23 years old, when he began to compete at amateur shows. His first show was the 2005 amateur Bev Francis Atlantic States show. Much to his surprise, he won the heavyweight class and the overall title. The following year, Evan went on to win the NPC Junior Championships and take the 1st and overall as well.

In 2007, Evan followed this success by earning his Pro Card, when he won the super-heavyweight class at that years NPC National Bodybuilding & Fitness Championships.

== Professional career ==
During the course of his bodybuilding career, Centopani has consistently placed high in competition. Indeed, at his first professional show; the New York Pro in 2009, he unexpectedly took 1st place against much more experienced competition in front of the large crowd at the Tribeca Performing Arts Center.

Centopani is widely known for his longtime sponsorship with Animal, spanning the past 16 years (as of 2022). He was sponsored by Animal from 2006 to 2014, when he left for Prime Nutrition, but returned to Animal only 17 months later. He has remained with Animal since his return in 2015, with which he is one of the organizations most praised and integral athletes. He developed & debuted his own meal replacement powder for Animal, dubbed "Animal Meal", in 2019.

In 2007, he won the superheavyweight class and overall title for the NPC National Bodybuilding & Fitness Championships, where he earned his pro card.

On May 16, 2009, at his pro debut, Evan Centopani won first place at the New York Pro show at the Tribeca Performing Arts Center in New York.

In a February 8, 2010, interview with Shawn Ray on MD Radio, Centopani announced that he would be taking the 2010 season off, and that he would not compete again until the 2011 Arnold Classic.

In a 2022 video clip, Centopani unofficially announced his retirement from competing in professional bodybuilding, claiming that he most likely will not be competing again as he is comfortable with the level of success he has attained in his professional career.

== Injury and other interests ==
In February 2017, Centopani slipped on black ice outside his home, resulting in a serious fall which ruptured his left quadriceps tendon and required surgery to repair. It was the first major injury he had experienced in his 12-year bodybuilding career. The injury precluded him from training for and participating in the 2017 IFBB New York Pro competition as he had planned. He produced a series of videos documenting his recovery process from this injury on his YouTube channel.

Centopani planned on making a comeback in 2020 at the New York Pro, but his show was cancelled as a result of the COVID-19 pandemic. He has also branched out from bodybuilding, with deep focus on diet, various cuisines, health, nutrition and mental wellbeing, earning him a significant following on YouTube, as well as helping others reach success through his online coaching platform. In partnership with ANIMAL, he launched, Animal Meal, a complete meal and protein rich, meal replacement. He chose to spend his time offering advice and tools to stay healthy and lean – setting up a website to help the general public and producing his own line of merchandise himself.

== Competition history ==
Centopani competes in the superheavyweight class.

=== Amateur ===
- 2006 Atlantic City Championships - 1st, overall winner
- 2006 NPC Nationals - 1st, 2nd overall
- 2007 NPC Nationals - 1st, overall winner

=== Professional ===
- 2009 New York Pro - 1st
- 2011 Flex Pro - 1st
- 2011 Arnold Classic - 4th
- 2012 Arnold Classic - 3rd
- 2012 Mr. Olympia - 8th
- 2013 IFBB Tampa Pro - 1st
- 2013 Mr. Olympia - 13th
- 2014 Arnold Classic - 5th
- 2014 IFBB Australia Pro Grand Prix - 3rd
- 2016 Arnold Classic Australia - 5th

== Personal life ==
Centopani resides in Trumbull, Connecticut, and trains at the famed Montanari Bros "The Super Gym" branch of Powerhouse Gym in New Haven, his "home base" and the main gym from which he has built his career. He is also a mentor to up and coming bodybuilders such as, James Hollingshead and Vincenzo Massone. Outside of bodybuilding, he received his bachelor's degree from Fairfield University. Centopani remains both a competitive bodybuilder and a sought after athlete in fitness media.

Centopani's paternal uncle is retired professional wrestler and current trainer Paul Centopani, aka Paul Roma.

== See also ==
- Frank McGrath
- Roelly Winklaar
