= Qatar at the 2022 World Games =

- IOC code: QAT
- NOC: Qatar Olympic Committee

in Birmingham, United States 7 July 2022 – 17 July 2022
- Competitors: 12 in 2 sports
- Medals Ranked 63rd: Gold 0 Silver 1 Bronze 0 Total 1

World Games appearances (overview)
- 1981; 1985; 1989; 1993; 1997; 2001; 2005; 2009; 2013; 2017; 2022

Qatar competed at the 2022 World Games held in Birmingham, United States from 7 to 17 July 2022. Athletes representing Qatar won one silver medal and the country finished in 63rd place in the medal table.

== Medalists ==
Medal	Name	Sport	Event	Date
Silver	Men's team	Beach handball	Men's tournament	15 July

== Competitors ==
The following is the list of number of competitors in the Games.

Sport	Men	Women	Total
Beach handball	10	0	10
Cue sports	2	0	2
Total	12	0	12

== Beach handball ==
Qatar won the silver medal in the men's beach handball tournament.

== Cue sports ==
Qatar competed in cue sports.

Athlete	Event	Round of 16	Quarterfinal	Semifinal	Final / BM
Athlete	Event	Opposition Result	Opposition Result	Opposition Result	Opposition Result
Ali Al-Obaidli	Snooker	Kongkitchertchoo (THA); W 3–0	Dikme (GER); W 3–1	Cheung (HKG); L 0–3	Morgan (GBR); L 2–3
Ahmed Saif	Snooker	Kowalski (POL); L 0–3	did not advance		
