= Bodybuilding at the 1989 World Games =

Medal events in both men's (4) and women's (2) bodybuilding were included in the 1989 World Games. The 1989 Games were the third World Games, an international quadrennial multi-sport event, and were held in Karlsruhe, West Germany. Point scoring was typically based on mandatory posing (front, back and side poses) and optional posing determined by the athlete. Bodybuilders from eleven nations won medals.

== Medalists ==
Event	Gold	Silver	Bronze
Men
Heavyweight (+80kg)	Andreas Münzer (AUT)	Francois Gay (SUI)	Wayne GRADY (USA)
Light-heavyweight (-80kg)	Thorne Henderson (CAN)	Mirosław Daszkiewicz (POL)	Markus Vollert (GER)
Middleweight (-70kg)	Dong-Ki Han (KOR)	Ray A. Williams (CAN)	Daniel Ocussieu (FRA)
Lightweight (-65kg)	Bernd Haid (GER)	Yong-Chul Park (KOR)	Alfonso Gomez (ESP)
Women
Middleweight (+52kg)	Christa Brauch (GER)	Jutta Tippelt (GER)	Claudia Montemaggi (ITA)
Lightweight (-52kg)	Helga Popp (GER)	Kay Caseley (GBR)	Sharon Lewis (USA)
