= Andrey Tarasenko (powerlifter) =

Russian powerlifter

Personal information
- Born: 29 January 1975 (age 51) Bogotol, Russia

Sport
- Sport: Powerlifting
Medal record
Representing Russia
World Championships
Gold medal – first place	1999 Trento	90 kg
Gold medal – first place	2000 Akita	90 kg
Gold medal – first place	2001 Sotkamo	90 kg
Silver medal – second place	2003 Vejle	90 kg
Gold medal – first place	2004 Cape Town	90 kg
Gold medal – first place	2005 Miami	90 kg
Gold medal – first place	2007 Solden	100 kg
World Games
Silver medal – second place	2001 Akita	Middleweight
Gold medal – first place	2005 Duisburg	Middleweight
European Championships
Gold medal – first place	2002 Eskilstuna	90 kg
Gold medal – first place	2004 Nymburk	90 kg
Gold medal – first place	2006 Prostějov	100 kg

Andrey Viktorovich Tarasenko (Russian: Андрей Викторович Тарасенко, born 29 January 1975) is a Russian powerlifting competitor who won six world titles between 1999 and 2007.
