= Roelly Winklaar =

Dutch bodybuilder (born 1977)

- Professional bodybuilder

Personal info
- Nickname: The Beast
- Born: June 22, 1977 (age 49); Curaçao

Best statistics
- Height: 5 ft 6 in (1.68 m)
- Weight: Contest: 295 lb (134 kg); Off season: 320 lb (145 kg)

Professional (Pro) career
- Pro-debut: Arnold Amateur; 2009
- Best win: Arnold Sports Festival Australia, 1st Place; 2018

Egberton Rulove "Roelly" Etienne-Winklaar (born June 22, 1977) is a Curaçaoan/ Dutch IFBB professional bodybuilder.

== Statistics ==
- Height: 5 ft 6 in (168 cm)
- Off Season Weight: 320 pounds (150 kg)
- Competition Weight: 295 pounds (134 kg)
- Upper Arm Size: 24 in (61 cm)
- Thigh Size: 29 in (74 cm)
- Waist Size: 35 in (89 cm)
- Calf Size: 20 in (51 cm)
- Neck Size: 19 in (48 cm)

== Early life and career ==
Roelly was born in Curaçao. His father died in a motorcycle accident when he was four years old. His mother moved the family to Rotterdam in the Netherlands when he was five years old. Although he enjoyed bodybuilding from a young age, he only became serious about the sport after a near-fatal car crash brought his life into focus. He then set his goals to becoming a pro, which he achieved by earning his pro card in 2009, then followed up by winning in New York City, in 2010.

He spent much of his early career, under the watchful eye of Sibil “Grandma” Peeters, which afforded him an advanced education on proper exercise technique to get the most out of every movement. He lived for a few years in Almere, before briefly moving to the USA as a professional.

== Professional career ==
After earning his pro card, Roelly returned for the 2010 IFBB Arnold Classic and turned plenty of heads with an immense physique that earned him a strong seventh-place finish in a deep field in his IFBB debut. After placing third at the 2010 IFBB Australia Pro Grand Prix, Roelly won the 2010 IFBB New York Pro.

Following this massive accomplishment, Winklaar experienced a boost in motivation and became a force to be reckoned with, earning his first Mr Olympia qualification. Considering he beat out more established veterans like Hidetada Yamagishi and Dennis Wolf. Since the 2010s, Winklaar has become one of the leading bodybuilding pros, twice finishing in the top 5 of the Mr. Olympia finals.

== Physique ==
Winklaar is noted for his large physique, displaying a combination of massive size and conditioning, often out sizing taller competitors. In part due to his years spent as a gymnast in his youth, Winklaar is considered to have the best arms in bodybuilding history, measuring at 24 inches. Winklaar has stated that other than intensity, he has not had to do anything special for his arms. As long as he trained them hard, they kept growing and growing. These attributes, along with his engaging posing and personality, has made him a fan favorite among bodybuilding fans.

== Other media ==
Roelly Winklaar was prominently featured as one of the lead figures featured in the 2013 documentary, Generation Iron, which highlights his preparation and training for the 2012 Mr. Olympia. Winklaar's appearance, in particular, earned critical acclaim, documenting tensions with his then-trainer Sibil 'Grandma' Peeters and their declining relationship as his star rose.

== Personal life ==
Winklaar has three children and resides in Amsterdam in the off season. He does his contest prep at Oxygen Gym in Kuwait City. His younger brother Quincy is also an IFBB Pro League bodybuilder.

== Competitive history ==
- 2021 IFBB Romania Pro - 9th
- 2021 IFBB EVLs Prague Pro - 5th
- 2021 IFBB Yamamoto Pro - 2nd
- 2021 IFBB Mr. Olympia - 11th
- 2021 IFBB Europa Pro - 2nd
- 2021 IFBB Chicago Pro - 5th
- 2019 IFBB Yamamoto Pro - 1st
- 2019 IFBB Mr. Olympia - 5th
- 2019 IFBB Arnold Classic Australia - 3rd
- 2019 IFBB Arnold Classic Ohio - 5th
- 2018 IFBB EVLs Prague Pro - 1st
- 2018 IFBB Mr. Olympia - 3rd
- 2018 IFBB Arnold Classic Australia - 1st
- 2018 IFBB Arnold Classic Ohio - 4th
- 2017 IFBB EVLs Prague Pro - 1st
- 2017 IFBB Mr. Olympia - 6th
- 2017 IFBB Arnold Classic Europe - 4th
- 2016 IFBB Mr. Olympia - 6th
- 2015 IFBB Arnold Sports Festival - 6th
- 2015 IFBB Arnold Classic Australia - 6th
- 2015 IFBB Mr. Olympia - 7th
- 2015 IFBB Arnold Classic Europe - 5th
- 2015 IFBB EVLs Prague Pro - 6th
- 2015 IFBB Nordic Pro - 2nd
- 2014 IFBB Wings of Strength Chicago Pro - 1st
- 2014 IFBB Mr. Olympia - 12th
- 2014 IFBB Arnold Classic Europe - 5th
- 2014 IFBB Dubai Pro - 3rd
- 2014 IFBB EVLs Prague Pro - 4th
- 2014 IFBB San Marino Pro - 4th
- 2014 IFBB Nordic Pro - 1st
- 2013 IFBB Chicago Pro - 1st
- 2013 IFBB Mr. Olympia - 7th
- 2013 IFBB Arnold Classic Europe - 6th
- 2012 IFBB Mr. Olympia - 12th
- 2012 IFBB Nordic Pro - 1st
- 2012 IFBB Sheru Classic Asian Grand Prix Pro - 4th
- 2012 IFBB British Grand Prix - 6th
- 2012 IFBB Prague Pro Championship - 8th
- 2012 IFBB Tampa Bay Pro - 4th
- 2012 IFBB Arnold Classic Europe - 3rd
- 2012 IFBB Europa Super Show - 4th
- 2011 IFBB Arnold Classic - 8th
- 2011 IFBB British Grand Prix - 2nd
- 2011 IFBB Mr. Europe Grand Prix - 2nd
- 2011 IFBB FIBO Power Pro Germany - 3rd
- 2011 IFBB New York Pro - 9th
- 2010 IFBB Arnold Classic - 7th
- 2010 IFBB Australian Pro Grand Prix - 3rd
- 2010 IFBB Mr. Olympia - 14th
- 2010 IFBB New York Pro - 1st
- 2009 NPC Arnold Amateur - 1st

== See also ==
- List of male professional bodybuilders
- Mr. Olympia
- Arnold Classic
- Brandon Curry
- Dexter Jackson
- Cedric McMillan
