= Christine Reed =

Christine Emerson Reed (c. 1943 – April 24, 1996) was an American politician and environmental activist. She was the mayor of Santa Monica, California, from 1984 to 1986. First elected to the city council in 1975, she served for a record four terms as councilmember until she was defeated in 1990. She was a moderate Republican. Before becoming an elected official, she was secretary of Save Santa Monica Bay, a group that was instrumental in defeating a proposal to demolish the Santa Monica Pier and build a fake island. A graduate of the University of California, Los Angeles, she had studied political science.

In 1981, Reed was featured in two television commercials that aired in Minneapolis, Minnesota, criticizing Santa Monica's tough rent control laws. The campaign succeeded in defeating a rent control charter amendment in Minneapolis.

In November 1997, the former Lincoln Park was renamed Christine Emerson Reed Park.
