= Kamal El-Gargni =

Libyan bodybuilder (born 1971)

Kamal Elgargni
- Professional bodybuilder

Personal info
- Born: 21 November 1971 (age 54); Tripoli, Libya

Best statistics
- Height: 5 ft 7 in (1.70 m)

Professional (Pro) career
- Best win: Mr. Olympia, 212 lb; 2019
- Predecessor: Flex Lewis
- Successor: Shaun Clarida

Kamal Abdulsalam El-Gargni (Arabic: كمال القرقني; born in 1971) is a Libyan professional bodybuilder residing in Tampa. He won the 212 Mr. Olympia in 2019.

== Biography ==
Kamal El-Gargni, originally from Libya, started training in 1993 and won his first competition – Libyan championship (70 kg class) in 1994. In 1997 moved to Malta and in 1998, to the United Kingdom. At 2001 NABBA Britain he won his height class division. In 2002, he started representing Qatar. Between 2003 and 2014 he won six IFBB World Amateur class shows, 10 Asian Gold Cup wins, and multiple gold medals in African and European Championships.

== Competitive history ==
Kamal Elgargni has competed in multiple professional shows:

- 2001 NABBA Mr. Universe, short, 1st
- 2002 NABBA European Championships, overall, 1st
- 2002 NABBA European Championships, short, 1st
- 2002 NABBA World Championships, overall, 1st
- 2002 NABBA World Championships, short, 1st
- 2003 IFBB Asian Amateur Championships, middleweight, 1st
- 2003 IFBB Night of Champions, 21st (did not place)
- 2003 IFBB World Amateur Championships, middleweight, disqualified
- 2004 IFBB Asian Amateur Championships, middleweight, 1st
- 2005 IFBB Asian Amateur Championships, middleweight, 1st
- 2005 IFBB World Amateur Championships, middleweight, 1st
- 2005 World Games, middleweight, 1st
- 2006 Asian Games, middleweight, 1st
- 2006 IFBB World Amateur Championships, middleweight, 1st
- 2007 Asian Amateur Championships - IFBB, middleweight, 1st
- 2007 NPC Excalibur (Los Angeles), light-heavyweight, 1st
- 2008 IFBB World Amateur Championships, middleweight, 1st
- 2009 Arnold Amateur - IFBB, light-heavyweight, 1st
- 2009 IFBB World Amateur Championships, light-heavyweight, 4th
- 2009 World Games, heavyweight, 2nd
- 2011 ABBF Asian Championships, overall 1st
- 2011 ABBF Asian Championships, light-heavyweight, 1st
- 2011 WBPF World Championships, light-heavyweight, 1st
- 2013 IFBB Asian Amateur Championships, classic, 2nd
- 2013 IFBB Asian Amateur Championships, heavyweight, 1st
- 2013 IFBB Asian Amateur Championships, masters (40+), 2nd
- 2013 ABBF Asian Championships, light-heavyweight, 1st
- 2013 ABBF Asian Championships, overall, 1st
- 2013 IFBB Mediterranean Amateur Championships, overall, 1st
- 2013 IFBB Mediterranean Amateur Championships, light-heavyweight, 1st
- 2013 IFBB Mediterranean Amateur Championships, Masters, 1st
- 2013 World Amateur Championships - IFBB, light-heavyweight, 1st
- 2018 IFBB Arnold Classic, 212 lb, 1st
- 2018 IFBB Mr. Olympia, 212 lb, 3rd
- 2019 IFBB Mr. Olympia, 212 lb, 1st
- 2020 IFBB Mr. Olympia, 212 lb, 2nd
- 2021 IFBB Mr. Olympia, 212 lb, 3rd
