= Brandon Curry =

American professional bodybuilder (born 1982)

- Professional bodybuilder
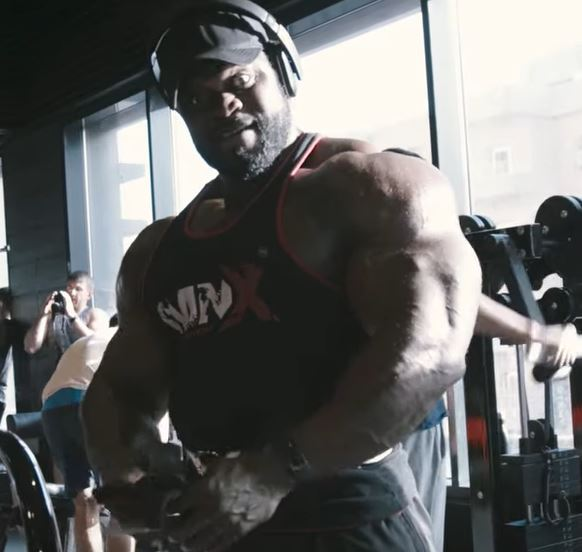

Personal info
- Nickname: The Prodigy, Beefcake
- Born: October 19, 1982 (age 44); Nashville, Tennessee, U.S.

Best statistics
- Height: 5 ft 8 in (1.73 m)
- Weight: Contest: 255 lb (116 kg); Off season: 265 lb (120 kg)

Professional (Pro) career
- Pro-debut: Mr. Olympia; 2011
- Best win: Mr. Olympia; 2019
- Predecessor: Shawn Rhoden
- Successor: Mamdouh Elssbiay

Brandon Curry (born October 19, 1982) is an American professional bodybuilder who competes in the men's open bodybuilding division in the IFBB Pro League. He is a former Mr. Olympia, having won the title in the 2019 Mr. Olympia competition, and two-time (2019 & 2022) Arnold Classic US winner.

== Biography ==
=== Early life ===
Curry was born and raised in Nashville, Tennessee. He first became interested in weight training when he received a pair of Hulk Hogan-branded dumbbells for his sixth birthday. Curry would later recall in a magazine interview that he was motivated by superhero action figures G.I. Joe and the Rocky and Rambo films to develop his body to its fullest muscular capacity.

As a child, Curry's parents enrolled him in gymnastics classes, but he lost interest in the sport. Curry was involved in wrestling, track and field and football while he was a student at Hunters Lane Comprehensive High School in Nashville.

Curry attended Middle Tennessee State University in Murfreesboro, Tennessee, where he majored in exercise science. He initially played on the university's football team, but later left the team and switched his athletic focus to bodybuilding-related weight training. Outside of bodybuilding, Curry works as a personal trainer. He divides his residency between Nashville and Oceanside, California.

=== Bodybuilding career ===
Brandon Curry entered his first bodybuilding contest at 19 in 2000 and won not just the novice title but also the open overall. In 2003, he won the 2003 Supernatural Bodybuilding Show. On June 17, 2006, he came in second in the light-heavyweight division at the NPC Junior National Championships; The five-foot-seven Curry weighed 189 pounds for that event. The following year, with 28 additional pounds added to his frame, he moved up to the heavyweight division for the NPC USA Championships on July 28, 2007, where he finished second in his division. On November 17, 2007, he came in second in the heavyweight division for that year's NPC National Championships.

In 2019, he won the Arnold Classic and cemented himself as one of the elite bodybuilders in the world with his win at the 2019 Mr. Olympia. His initial success was in 2011 Mr. Olympia competitions where he stood 8th on his first time coming to Olympia's Stage. On July 25, 2008, Curry won both the heavyweight division and the overall of the NPC USA Championships, which secured him ranking as a professional bodybuilder.

== Competitive history ==
- 2003 Supernatural Bodybuilding, 1st
- 2006 NPC Junior National Championships, 2nd
- 2007 NPC USA Championships, 2nd
- 2008 NPC USA Championships, 1st
- 2010 Europa Super Show, 8th
- 2010 Pro Bodybuilding Weekly Championship, 6th
- 2011 IFBB Mr.Olympia, 8th
- 2012 IFBB Arnold Classic, 7th
- 2013 IFBB Arnold Classic Brasil, 1st
- 2015 IFBB Arnold Classic, 7th
- 2017 IFBB New Zealand Pro, 1st
- 2017 IFBB Arnold Classic Aus, 1st
- 2017 IFBB Mr. Olympia, 8th
- 2017 IFBB Ferrigno Legacy, 1st
- 2018 IFBB Mr. Olympia, 5th
- 2019 IFBB Arnold Classic, 1st
- 2019 IFBB Mr. Olympia, 1st
- 2020 IFBB Mr. Olympia, 2nd
- 2021 IFBB Mr. Olympia, 2nd
- 2022 IFBB Arnold Classic, 1st
- 2022 IFBB Mr. Olympia, 4th
- 2023 IFBB Mr. Olympia, 4th
- 2024 IFBB Mr. Olympia, 9th
- 2025 IFBB Mr. Olympia, 7th
