= Tito Raymond =

American bodybuilder

Tito Raymond (born August 10, 1969) is a National Physique Committee ("NPC") bodybuilder and athlete.

Raymond made his NPC debut in 1993 by competing in Musclemania and where he came 5th. His first 1st place win came in the 1997 Musclemania competition. Raymond continued on to win three more first place winnings in the NPC Team Universe Championships for three years in a row, from 1999 to 2001.

== Personal life ==
Raymond was born on August 10, 1969 in Chicago, Illinois.

Raymond has eight siblings and is the older brother of IFBB Pro bodybuilder Jose Raymond. He is married to Amy Fadhli and they have two sons. He currently resides in Los Angeles, California.

== Stats ==
- Height: 5'8
- Off Season Weight:
- Competition Weight: 180 lbs.

== Competition history ==
Year Competition Placing

- 1993 Musclemania Middleweight, 5th
- 1993 NPC USA Championships Middleweight, 13th
- 1994 Musclemania Light Heavyweight, 4th
- 1994 NPC Team Universe Championships Middleweight, 10th
- 1995 NPC Team Universe Championships Middleweight, 6th
- 1996 NPC Team Universe Championships Middleweight, 3rd
- 1997 Musclemania Middleweight, 1st
- 1997 NPC Team Universe Championships Middleweight, 2nd
- 1998 NPC Team Universe Championships Middleweight, 3rd
- 1998 NPC USA Championships Middleweight, 9th
- 1999 Musclemania Professional, 1st
- 1999 NPC Team Universe Championships Middleweight, 1st
- 1999 NPC USA Championships Middleweight, 4th
- 1999 NPC World Amateur Championships Middleweight, 3rd
- 2000 NPC Team Universe Championships Middleweight, 1st
- 2000 NPC USA Championships Middleweight, 3rd
- 2000 IFBB World Amateur Championships Middleweight, 4th
- 2001 NPC Team Universe Championships Middleweight, 1st
- 2001 NPC USA Championships Middleweight, 2nd
- 2001 IFBB World Games Middleweight, 3rd
- 2002 NPC USA Championships Middleweight, 5th
- 2003 NPC California Championships Light Heavyweight, 2nd
