= Susanne Niederhauser =

Austrian bodybuilder

Susanne Niederhauser (born 13 August 1970) is a professional IFBB female bodybuilder from Wels, Austria. Niederhauser began bodybuilding when she was 17 years old, and has competed as a professional since 2002. Her inspiration is Cory Everson.

== Profile ==
- Height: 5 ft 6 in (168 cm)
- Competition weight: 125 lbs
- Off-season weight: 132 - 140 lbs
- Arms: 15 inches
- Waist: 25.2 inches
- Quads: 22 inches
- Calves: 15 inches

== Contest history ==
- 1995 Upper Austrian Championship - 1st
- 1995 Austrian Championship - 2nd
- 1996 Upper Austrian Championship - 1st overall
- 1996 Austrian Championship - 1st
- 1997 Austrian Championship - 2nd
- 1997 IFBB European Championship (Minsk) - 8th
- 1998 Austria Cup (International) - 1st overall
- 1998 IFBB World Championship (Alicante, Spain) - 4th
- 1999 IFBB World Championship (Sydney, Australia) - 1st
- 2000 Austria Cup - 1st
- 2000 IFBB World Championship (Warsaw, Poland) - 5th
- 2001 World Games (Akita, Japan) - 2nd
- 2002 South West Pro Cup (Dallas) - 1st (LW)
- 2002 IFBB Ms. Olympia (Las Vegas) - 7th (LW)
- 2003 Jan Tana Classic (Charlotte, North Carolina) - 4th (LW)
- 2005 Europa Super Show (Texas) - 3rd (LW)
- 2005 IFBB Ms. International - 4th (LW)
- 2007 IFBB Ms. International - 16th

== DVDs ==
- Susanne Niederhauser - Austrian Muscle Queen (2002)

== See also ==
- List of male professional bodybuilders
- List of female professional bodybuilders
