= TAM (theatre) =

Theatre in Krefeld, Germany

Coordinates: 51°18′16″N 6°35′05″E

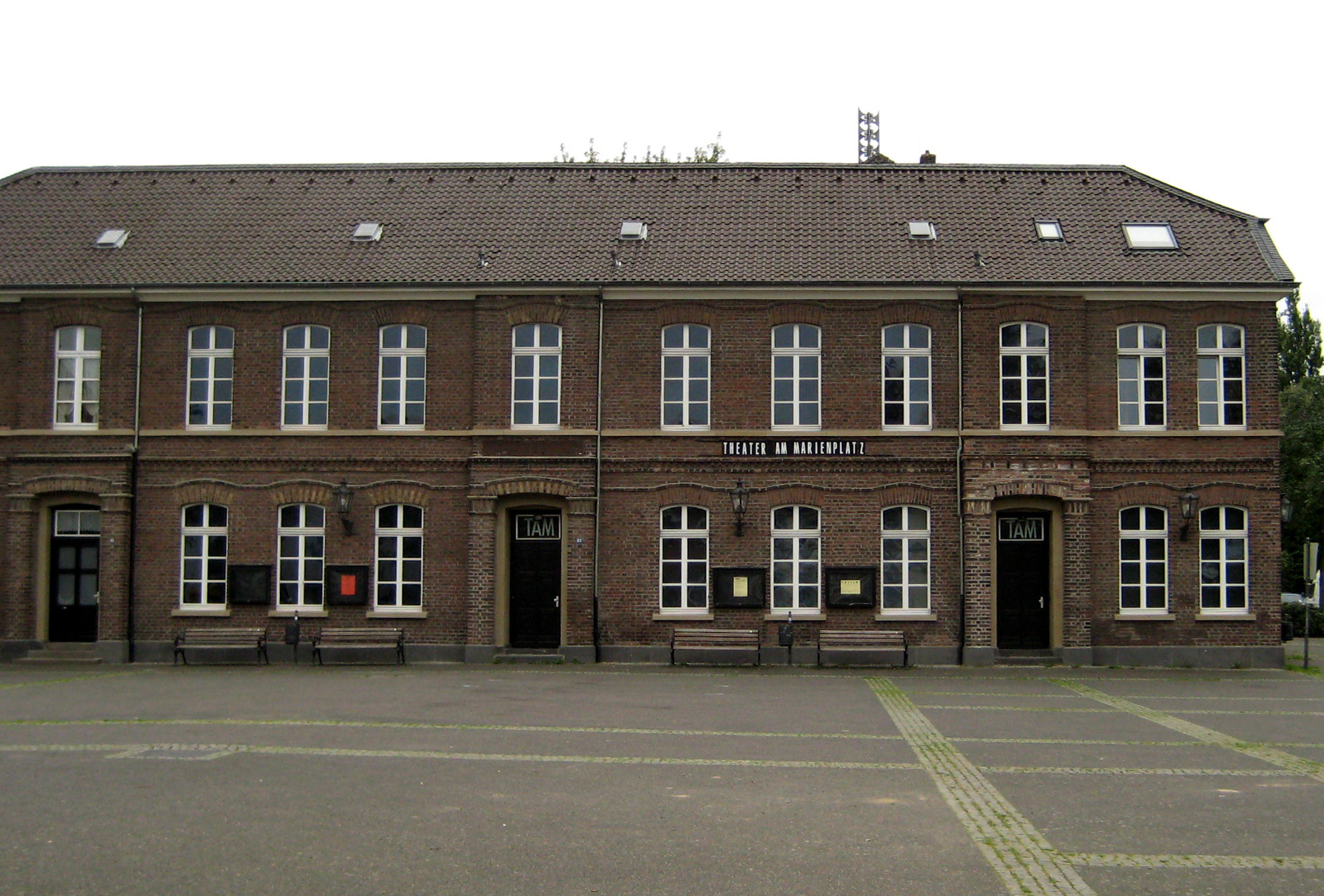
An image of TAM (theatre)

TAM (Theater) is a theatre in Krefeld, North Rhine-Westphalia, Germany.
