= Akita City Culture Hall =

- 秋田市文化会館

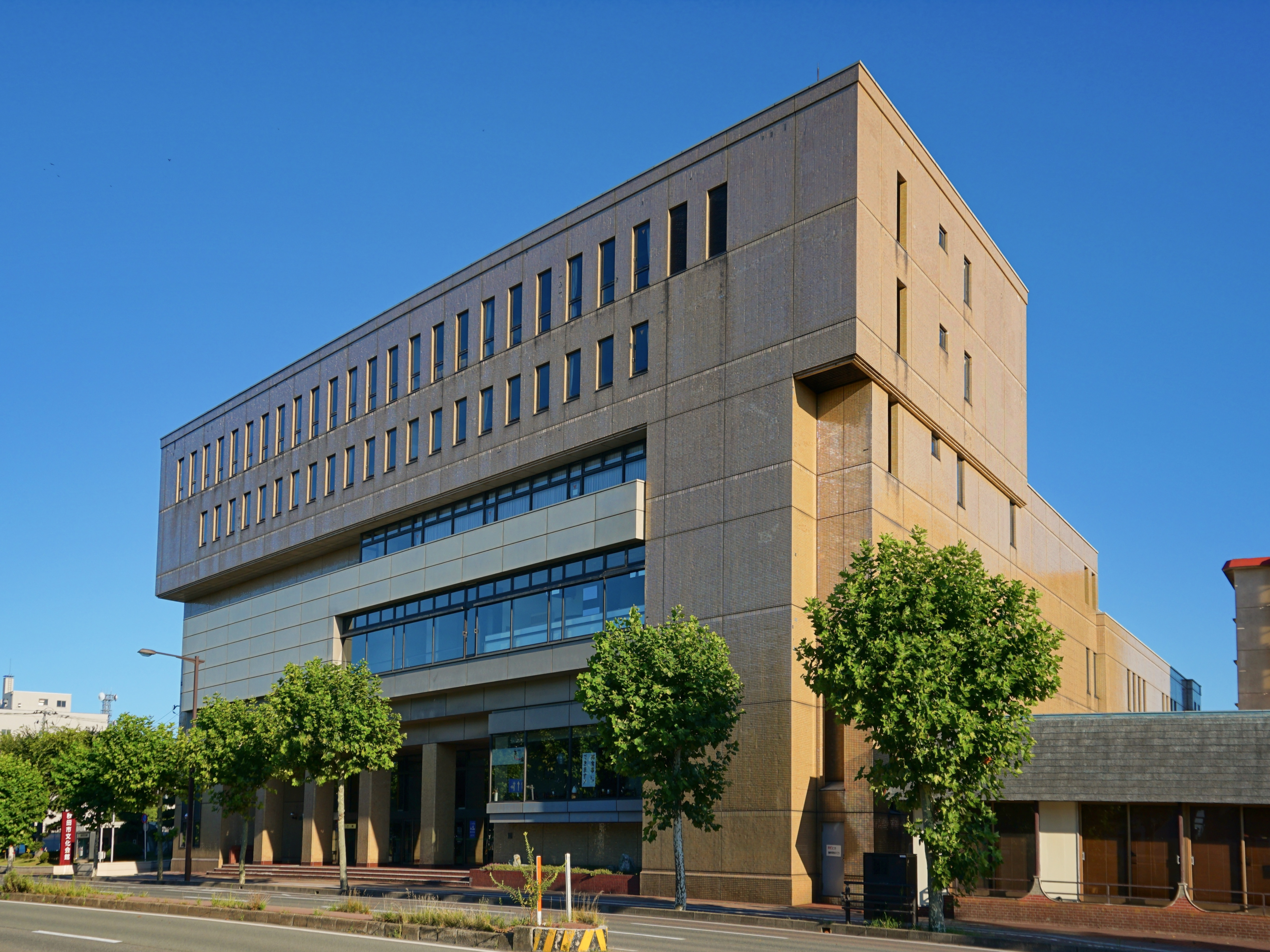
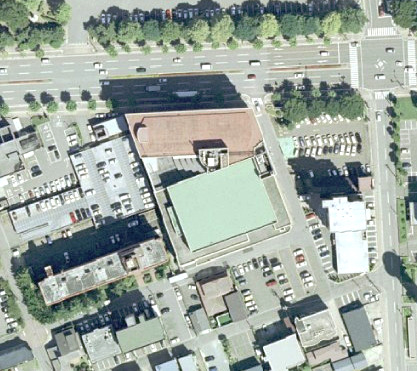
- Satellite view
- Alternative names: Akita City Cultural Center

General information
- Type: Concert Hall
- Location: Akita, Japan, 7-3-1 Sanno Akitashi 010-0961
- Coordinates: 39°43′6.6″N 140°05′52.9″E
- Groundbreaking: 22 June 1978
- Completed: 30 April 1980
- Opened: 22 June 1980
- Closed: 30 September 2022 (proposed)
- Cost: JPY 3,564,500,000
- Owner: City of Akita

Technical details
- Floor count: 6
- Floor area: 14,284 m^{2}

Other information
- Seating capacity: Large Hall:1,188; Small Hall:400

Website
- www.city.akita.lg.jp/kurashi/rekishi-bunka/1002681/index.html

The Akita City Culture Hall (秋田市文化会館, Akitashi Bunka Kaikan) is a multi-purpose public cultural facility in Akita, Japan. It hosted the 2001 World Games for powerlifting and bodybuilding. The main concert hall has a seating capacity of 1,188. Notable past performers include TM Revolution and Helloween.

== Events at Akitashi Bunka Kaikan ==
- Keith Jarrett - 23 January 1984
- Yngwie Malmsteen - 19 March 1994
- Julia Fordham - 11 August 1994
- Skid Row - 17 June 1995
- Yngwie Malmsteen - 25 September 1995
- Helloween - 21 September 1996
- Bodybuilding at the 2001 World Games - 18–19 August 2001
- Powerlifting at the 2001 World Games - 20–21 August 2001
- Quintet (grappling) -30 November 2019

== Facilities ==
- Large hall
- Small hall
- Exhibition halls
- Conference rooms
- Practice rooms
- Rehearsal room
- Nursery room
- Tea room
- Cafe

== See also ==
- Akita Prefectural Hall
