= Ronnie Coleman =

American former bodybuilder (born 1964)

- Professional bodybuilder
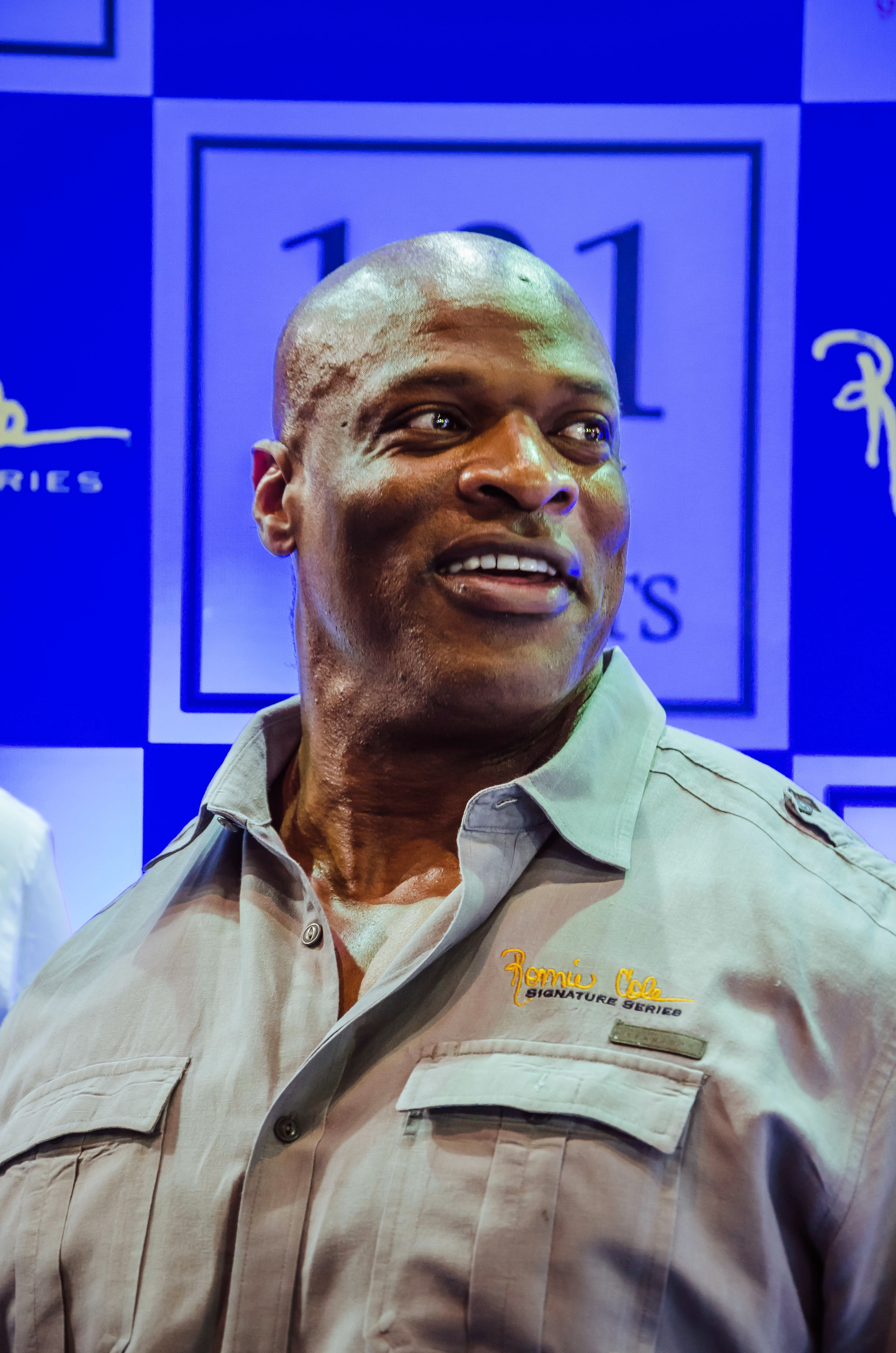
- Coleman during a public appearance in 2014

Personal info
- Nickname: The King
- Born: May 13, 1964 (age 62); Monroe, Louisiana, U.S.

Best statistics
- Height: 5 ft 11 in (180 cm)
- Weight: Contest: 287–300 lb (130–136 kg); Off season: 315–330 lb (143–150 kg)

Professional (Pro) career
- Pro-debut: IFBB World Amateur Championships; 1992
- Best win: IFBB Mr. Olympia; 1998–2005
- Predecessor: Dorian Yates
- Successor: Jay Cutler
- Active: 1990–2007

Coleman talking about his journey in October 2009

Ronald Dean Coleman (born May 13, 1964) is an American former professional bodybuilder who is widely regarded as the greatest bodybuilder of all time. Known as "The King", Coleman shares the all-time record for most Mr. Olympia titles at eight with Lee Haney. He won 26 IFBB professional titles, including the Mr. Olympia for eight consecutive years. He is renowned for his combination of size, conditioning and extremely heavy workouts. In 2022, FitnessVolt recognized Coleman as the strongest bodybuilder of all time.

Coleman was inducted into the International Sports Hall of Fame in 2016 and was bestowed with the 'Arnold Classic Lifetime Achievement Award' in 2021.

== Early life ==
Ronnie Dean Coleman was born on May 13, 1964, in Monroe, Louisiana, to Ed Coleman and Jessie Benton Coleman. He was raised in a household that emphasized hard work and commitment. He graduated cum laude from Grambling State University in 1989 with a BSc in accounting. While there, he played football as a middle linebacker with the Grambling State Tigers as a walk-on under Hall of Fame coach Eddie Robinson.

After graduation, he failed to find work as an accountant and instead went to work at Domino's Pizza, where he would eat the complimentary pizza every day due to being so poor that he could barely afford to eat outside of work.

He then became a police officer in Arlington, Texas, serving as an officer from 1989 to 2000 and a reserve officer until 2003.

== Bodybuilding career ==
=== 1990 to 1991 ===
Coleman's fellow officer Gustavo Arlotta suggested he attend the 'Metroflex Gym', owned by amateur bodybuilder Brian Dobson. Dobson offered Coleman a free lifetime membership if he allowed Dobson to train him for the upcoming 1990 Mr. Texas bodybuilding competition. After training for Mr. Texas, Coleman won first place in both the heavyweight and overall categories. He also managed to defeat Dobson himself. Then he participated at the 1990 NPC Nationals, winning 3rd place at the Heavyweight division.

The following year, Coleman turned pro and emerged 4th place at the 1991 NPC Nationals Heavyweight division. He also decisively won 1991 IFBB World Amateur Championships's Heavyweight division.

=== 1992 to 1994 ===
Coleman's rise to the top of bodybuilding was relatively slow. In his first participation at the Mr. Olympia contest: 1992 Mr. Olympia held in Helsinki, Finland he ended up becoming the last (16th place). He also emerged 14th at the 1992 Night of Champions and 11th at the 1992 Chicago Pro Championships.

In 1993 Coleman did not take part in Mr. Olympia, but managed a 6th place at 1993 Chicago Pro Championships, 4th place at 1993 IFBB French Grand Prix, 6th place at 1993 IFBB German Grand Prix and 6th place in 1993 Niagara Falls Pro.

In 1994 Mr. Olympia held in Atlanta, Georgia, Coleman ended up being the 15th. The top athletes were continuously improving with Dorian Yates taking bodybuilding to the next level, and Coleman also increased the weights and intensity of his workouts. He also constantly participated in powerlifting competitions. In the same year, he secured 3rd place at 1994 IFBB French Grand Prix, 3rd place at 1994 IFBB German Grand Prix and 4th place at 1994 San Jose Pro Invitational.

=== 1995 to 1997 ===
In 1995 Coleman won his first pro show, winning 1995 Canada Pro Cup. He also improved on his placement at Mr. Olympia, emerging 11th at 1995 Mr. Olympia held in Atlanta, Georgia. He also secured 4th place at 1995 IFBB French Grand Prix, 6th place at 1995 IFBB Russian Grand Prix, 3rd place at 1995 IFBB Ukrainian Grand Prix, 6th place at 1995 Houston Pro Championships and 3rd place at 1995 Night of Champions.

In 1996 Mr. Olympia held in Chicago, Illinois, Coleman emerged 6th, winning $12,000 in the process. He also won 1996 Canada Pro Cup. Furthermore, he also secured 2nd place at 1996 Florida Pro Invitational, 5th place at 1996 IFBB English Grand Prix, 5th place at 1996 IFBB German Grand Prix, 5th place at 1996 IFBB Spanish Grand Prix and 2nd place at 1996 Night of Champions.

Around this time, Coleman started to compete prolifically, traveling around the world and taking trains instead of flights because it was all he could afford, and kept up with the top athletes. He won 1997 IFBB Russian Grand Prix and came 3rd at 1997 Ironman Pro Invitational and 1997 IFBB Finnish Grand Prix. However, at 1997 Mr. Olympia held in Long Beach, California he was dropped to 9th place. He also secured 4th at 1997 Arnold Classic and 1997 IFBB Czech Grand Prix, 5th at 1997 IFBB English Grand Prix and 1997 IFBB German Grand Prix, 6th at 1997 IFBB Hungarian Grand Prix and 1997 San Jose Pro Invitational, and 7th at 1997 IFBB Spanish Grand Prix.

=== 1998 ===
In 1998, Coleman, who had made dramatic improvements to his physique, came to the 1998 IFBB Finnish Grand Prix with one of his best physiques ever. He defeated Kevin Levrone and Nasser El Sonbaty to win the title and started getting recognition for his 'wide and thick' back development. Both of Coleman's back poses: rear double biceps and rear lat spread were recognized as well as his front double biceps pose from this competition ranks among the best ever. He continued his success, also winning 1998 IFBB German Grand Prix, 1998 Toronto Pro and 1998 Night of Champions. Levrone stated "It was the beginning of the end, for me and every other bodybuilder".

When Dorian Yates won his final title before retiring the previous year, 1998 opened the door for a new Mr. Olympia champion. Flex Wheeler was favored to become the titleholder, with predominant competition coming from Levrone, El Sonbaty and Shawn Ray. However, Coleman, whose quadruple victories already in the calendar year had considerably elevated his esteem and brought further improvements, weighing 248 lb (112.5 kg) on stage, shredded to the bone, to defeat Wheeler, El Sonbaty, Levrone and Ray to win the 1998 Mr. Olympia held at Madison Square Garden in New York City, New York. He won a cash prize of $110,000. Judges praised Coleman's superior back development, v-taper, conditioning and the posing routine which all aided his victory.

=== 1999 ===
In 1999, Coleman went up against one of the most iconic and toughest lineups in bodybuilding history at 1999 IFBB English Grand Prix, where he emerged victorious after defeating Wheeler, Levrone, Dexter Jackson, Milos Sarcev, El Sonbaty and Markus Rühl who all came in with some of their best physiques ever. The competition went on to be known as 'The Greatest Show on Earth' and the final trio: Coleman, Wheeler and Levrone in this contest is regarded as the best top three ever on stage at the same time. Coleman's side chest pose from this competition ranks among the best ever.

At 1999 Mr. Olympia held at the iconic Mandalay Bay Arena in Las Vegas, Nevada, Coleman successfully defended his title after defeating the likes of Wheeler, Chris Cormier, Levrone, Ray, El Sonbaty, Paul Dillett, Lee Priest, Mike Matarazzo, Jean Pierre Fux and Pavol Jablonický. He was heavier than last year at 257 lb (116.6 kg) but brought same level of dryness and conditioning. Several experts and fellow IFBB pros including Milos Sarcev recognize this version to be Coleman's best physique. He also won 1999 World Pro Championships and still was working full-time at Arlington Police Department, being 2x Mr. Olympia champion.

=== 2000 ===
Coleman started 2000 with easily winning 2000 IFBB English Grand Prix and 2000 World Pro Championships. At 2000 Mr. Olympia held again at Mandalay Bay Arena in Las Vegas, Coleman won his third consecutive title with it being also the third consecutive time he secured perfect scores following 1998 and 1999 (5 points in each four rounds during prejudging and finals for an ultimate score of 20). Levrone emerged second, Wheeler third, Ray fourth and El Sonbaty fifth. Coleman also became only the sixth person after Sergio Oliva, Arnold Schwarzenegger, Frank Zane, Haney and Yates to win 3 Mr. Olympia titles in a row.

=== 2001 ===
In 2001, Coleman started the year with winning the 2001 Arnold Classic. He is noted for his conditioning in this competition. In addition to the prize money, he won a Hummer H1. Cormier emerged 2nd while Dennis James took 3rd. Then he proceeded to win 2001 IFBB New Zealand Grand Prix.

At 2001 Mr. Olympia held again at Mandalay Bay Arena in Las Vegas, he faced a formidable challenge from upcoming Jay Cutler, but successfully defended his title with a four-point lead to win his 4th consecutive Mr. Olympia title. Coleman also made history by becoming the first person in history to win both Mr. Olympia and Arnold Classic in the same calendar year.

=== 2002 ===
As advised by one of the judges the previous year, Coleman tried to come a bit leaner for the 2002 Mr. Olympia. Therefore instead of his standard 12-week cutting down period, he started 16 weeks prior which resulted in a slight loss of muscle mass which was clearly evident in his arms and legs. However, he edged Levrone to win his fifth consecutive title, in what happens to be a very close call according to many experts and critiques. Cormier took 3rd, Jackson took 4th and Günter Schlierkamp took 5th place. Bodyonics Pinnacle company gifted Coleman a Cadillac Escalade.

Coleman also won 2002 IFBB Dutch Grand Prix but came 2nd to Schlierkamp at 2002 Show of Strength Pro Championships, which was the only time he was defeated during his Olympia reign.

=== 2003 ===
In 2003, Coleman made massive improvements to his physique and came in for 2003 Mr. Olympia at a staggering 292 lb (132.4 kg) on-stage weight and ripped. Cutler, who had taken last year off described, even though he came well prepared and with confidence to dethrone the champion, the minute Coleman took his clothes off backstage, his mouth dropped and he knew it was game-over. Levrone quoted "Ronnie Coleman had reached a point, where he didn't look human backstage. It looked like a Silverback Gorilla. 'It' was part human, part gorilla". Jackson described him as the most dominant physique in history to ever grace a bodybuilding stage. Wheeler described Coleman's rear double biceps and rear lat spread poses were perfection from top to bottom and ranked the two poses among the greatest ever. Olympia head-judge Steve Weinberger said that Coleman brought a level of muscularity the world has never seen before or since. Coleman secured a perfect score and convincingly won his 6th title, tying his predecessor Yates as the joint-third most decorated Olympian in history. He also won his second Cadillac Escalade courtesy of Pinnacle Supplements.

Coleman did one more show that year, 2003 IFBB Russian Grand Prix, coming in even bigger than he came for the Olympia. It was another easy victory, taking Coleman's IFBB winning tally to 20, equaling Levrone.

=== 2004 ===
At 2004 Mr. Olympia, for the first time judges initiated a challenge round, where the top 6 finalists called out each other for a one-on-one pose comparison of their choice. Overall scores after round three was discarded, and the new challenge round standings were used to decide the winner. Coleman who came even bigger at 296 lb (134.3 kg), out-weighing even 285 lb (129.3 kg) Markus Rühl won the competition tying Schwarzenegger for 7 titles, becoming the joint-second most decorated Olympian in history. Cutler emerged 2nd to Coleman for the third time and Gustavo Badell secured 3rd place, followed by Jackson, Rühl and Schlierkamp.

Next came a phase where Coleman reached his heaviest ever on-stage weight, coming in between 301–305 lb (136.5–138.3 kg) for 2004 IFBB English Grand Prix, 2004 IFBB Dutch Grand Prix and 2004 IFBB Russian Grand Prix, winning all three and surpassing Vince Taylor to become the most decorated professional bodybuilder of all-time.

=== 2005 ===
At 2005 Mr. Olympia, announcer Mike Adamle introduced Coleman who was dressed in a medieval King's costume with the words "On the Seventh day God didn't rest, on the Seventh day God created Ronnie Coleman..." as Coleman held off Cutler, Badell, Schlierkamp, Víctor Martínez and James in a challenge round judged by previous rivals to win his 8th consecutive Mr. Olympia, equaling Haney as the most decorated Olympian in history. As soon as he was crowned the 8x time champion, IFBB president Ben Weider indicated that Coleman goes down in history as the greatest Mr. Olympia of all-time. Coleman won his biggest prize money of $150,000 for his victory.

=== 2006 to 2007 ===
Coleman's dominant reign as Mr. Olympia finally came to an end in 2006 Mr. Olympia where four-times his runner-up Jay Cutler edged him to earn his first title. Coleman came with the biggest upper arms he ever posed on stage at over 24 in (61 cm) in contest shape, but his clearly visible lat asymmetry cost him a 9th title. Coleman made his final appearance at 2007 Mr. Olympia where he placed 4th, and soon announced his retirement.

== Legacy and in popular culture ==
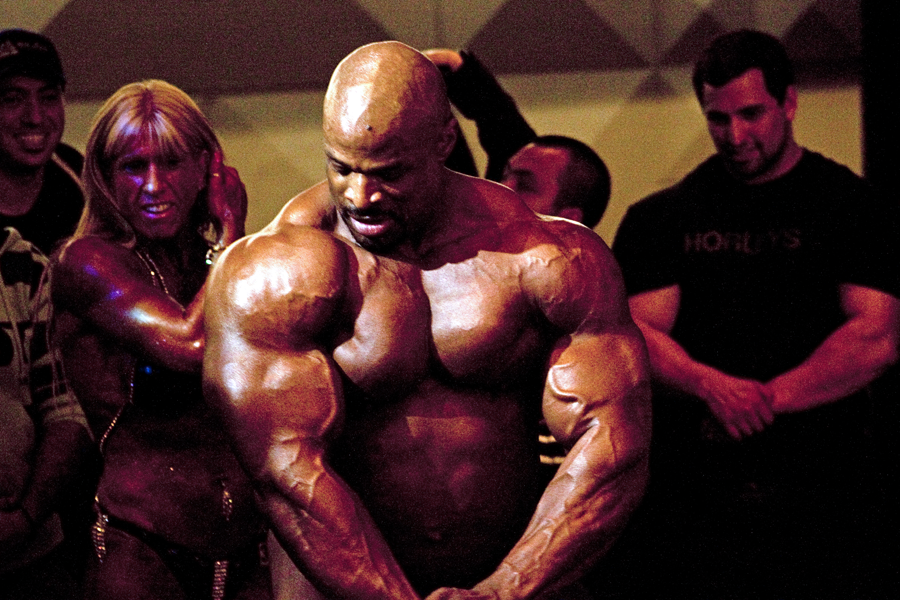
Coleman guest posing in October 2009, two years after his retirement

Movie director Mitsuru Okabe produced training videos of Coleman, including The First Training Video (1998), The Unbelievable (2000), The Cost of Redemption (2003), Relentless (2006) and On the Road. With his high-pitched voice, many of the lifts and vocal gimmicks Coleman popularized in them have become commonplace in the global physical culture community, especially after the advent of viral videos. The most popular of these, which he regularly shouted to himself as a form of self-encouragement, include "Yeah buddy!", "Light weight, baby!", "Ain't nothin' but a peanut!", "Nothin' to it, but to do it!", "Everybody wants to be a bodybuilder, but nobody wants to lift no heavy-ass weights".

Coleman's success as a professional bodybuilder has led to many product endorsements and other opportunities in his career, which he has traveled the world to promote. He has made many guest appearances around the world. Coleman was the recipient of the 2001 Admiral in the Texas Navy Certificate Award from Texas Governor Rick Perry for outstanding achievements in bodybuilding and for the promotion of physical fitness. He was inducted into the International Sports Hall of Fame in 2016, and was awarded the 'Arnold Schwarzenegger Lifetime Achievement Award' in 2021. Coleman is a supporter of Inner-City Games, co-founded by Schwarzenegger in 1991.

In 2011, Coleman launched Ronnie Coleman Signature Series (RCSS), a supplement company that provides sports nutrition and wellness products for bodybuilders and other athletes. Products such as 'King Whey' whey protein, 'King Mass' weight gainer and pre-workout product 'Yeah buddy' are among some of the bestsellers.

In 2018, Vlad Yudin documented Coleman's life and career in the Netflix documentary Ronnie Coleman: The King. For the film's credits, rapper Quan made a song called "Flexin' on Them (Ronnie Coleman)" inspired by Coleman's bodybuilding career.

== Personal life ==
In 1992, Coleman met Vickie Gates (who later went on to become 3x times IFBB Ms. International champion) at a local GNC store. She was his girlfriend for nearly 7 years. In 1998, Coleman met French-Lebanese personal trainer Rouaida Christine Achkar at a sports exposition in Paris, and they got married in 2007. However, they divorced soon after.

In 2016, Coleman married his long time girlfriend, American personal trainer Susan Williamson. They reside in Arlington, Texas, along with their four daughters. Coleman is a devout Christian and a family man.

== Nutrition ==
Coleman was noted for eating around 6,000 calories a day during his prime. He also followed a strict diet regime sticking to basics such as grilled chicken breasts, turkey breasts, steak, egg whites, rice, baked potatoes and grits with cheese, eating six meals a day. His daily protein intake was 600g and the daily carbohydrate intake differed from 100-1000g depending on the cutting or bulking phase.

== Health concerns ==
The extreme weights Coleman used over the years took a toll on his body, and he has undergone more than a dozen surgeries since 2007. These include double hip replacements and various attempts at alleviating chronic pain from damaged intervertebral discs costing millions. Despite using a wheelchair because he can no longer walk unassisted due to surgical procedures, Coleman continues to train, but uses only light weights now. Coleman has always said that he does not regret his choices and admits that he was determined to be the best bodybuilder he could be at any cost; even saying that, if anything, he regrets not having done even more to consolidate his legacy.

In June 2025, Coleman had a near-fatal brush with sepsis. Upon recovery, his family and friends launched a campaign titled 'Ronnie Strong' to raise awareness about sepsis.

== Physical statistics ==
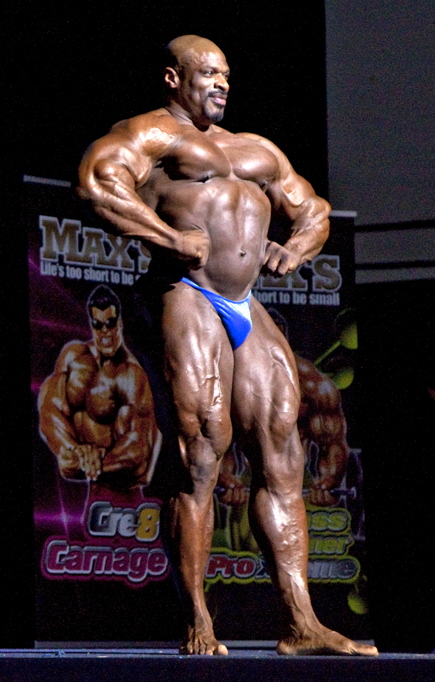
Coleman in 2009, two years after his retirement

- Height: 5 ft 11 in (180 cm)
- Contest weight: 287–300 pounds (130–136 kg)
- Off-season weight: 315–330 pounds (143–150 kg)
- Chest / Back: 60 in (152 cm)
- Arms: 24 in (61 cm)
- Legs: 36 in (91 cm)

== Famous lifts ==
- Deadlift: 800 lb (363 kg) × 2 reps (The Unbelievable, 2000)
- Squat: 800 lb (363 kg) × 2 reps (The Cost of Redemption, 2003)
- Bench press: 500 lb (227 kg) × 5 reps (The Cost of Redemption, 2003)
- Dumbbell Bench press: 200 lb (91 kg) Dumbbells × 12 reps (The Unbelievable, 2000)
- Military press: 315 lb (143 kg) × 12 reps (The Unbelievable, 2000)
- Dumbbell Shoulder press: 160 lb (73 kg) Dumbbells × 7 reps (The Cost of Redemption, 2003)
- Bent-over row: 515 lb (234 kg) × 10 reps (Relentless, 2006)
- T-bar (corner) row: 540 lb (245 kg) × 9 reps (The Unbelievable, 2000) & 505 lb (229 kg) x 12 reps (Relentless, 2006)
- Front Squat: 585 lb (265 kg) × 4 reps (The Unbelievable, 2000)
- Hack Squat: 765 lb (347 kg) × 8 reps (The Unbelievable, 2000)
- Lunges: 185 lb (84 kg) × 20 reps per leg (The Unbelievable, 2000)
- Barbell Shrugs: 735 lb (333 kg) × 11 reps (The Cost of Redemption, 2003)
- Dumbbell Shrugs: 250 lb (113 kg) Dumbbells × 15 reps (Relentless, 2006)
- Calf raises: 540 lb (245 kg) × 20 reps (Relentless, 2006)
- Leg press: 2,400 lb (1,089 kg) × 8 reps (The Cost of Redemption, 2003)

== Bodybuilding chronology ==
Year	Competition	Result
1990	Mr. Texas (Heavyweight & Overall)	1st
1990	NPC Nationals (Heavyweight)	3rd
1991	NPC Nationals (Heavyweight)	4th
1991	NPC USA Championships (Heavyweight)	14th
1991	World Amateur Championships (Heavyweight)	1st
1992	Chicago Pro Championships	11th
1992	Night of Champions	14th
1992	Mr. Olympia	16th
1993	Grand Prix France	4th
1993	Grand Prix Germany	6th
1993	Niagara Falls Pro	6th
1994	Grand Prix Germany	3rd
1994	Mr. Olympia	15th
1994	San Jose Pro Invitational	4th
1995	Canada Pro Cup	1st
1995	Grand Prix France	4th
1995	Grand Prix Russia	6th
1995	Grand Prix Ukraine	3rd
1995	Houston Pro Championships	6th
1995	Night of Champions	3rd
1995	Mr. Olympia	11th
1996	Canada Pro Cup	1st
1996	Florida Pro Invitational	2nd
1996	Grand Prix England	5th
1996	Grand Prix Germany	5th
1996	Grand Prix Spain	5th
1996	Night of Champions	2nd
1996	Mr. Olympia	6th
1997	Arnold Classic	4th
1997	Grand Prix Czech Republic	4th
1997	Grand Prix England	5th
1997	Grand Prix Finland	3rd
1997	Grand Prix Germany	5th
1997	Grand Prix Hungary	6th
1997	Grand Prix Russia	1st
1997	Grand Prix Spain	7th
1997	Ironman Pro Invitational	3rd
1997	Mr. Olympia	9th
1997	San Jose Pro Invitational	6th
1998	Grand Prix Finland	1st
1998	Grand Prix Germany	1st
1998	San Francisco Pro	2nd
1998	Night of Champions	1st
1998	Mr. Olympia	1st
1998	Toronto Pro Invitational	1st
1999	Grand Prix England	1st
1999	Mr. Olympia	1st
1999	World Pro Championships	1st
2000	Grand Prix England	1st
2000	Mr. Olympia	1st
2000	World Pro Championships	1st
2001	Arnold Classic	1st
2001	Mr. Olympia	1st
2001	Grand Prix New Zealand	1st
2002	Grand Prix Holland	1st
2002	Mr. Olympia	1st
2002	Show of Strength Pro Championships	2nd
2003	Grand Prix Russia	1st
2003	Mr. Olympia	1st
2004	Grand Prix England	1st
2004	Grand Prix Holland	1st
2004	Grand Prix Russia	1st
2004	Mr. Olympia	1st
2005	Mr. Olympia	1st
2006	Grand Prix Austria	2nd
2006	Grand Prix Holland	2nd
2006	Grand Prix Romania	2nd
2006	Mr. Olympia	2nd
2007	Mr. Olympia	4th

== Filmography ==
Year	Film
1998	Ronnie Coleman: The First Training Video
2000	Ronnie Coleman: The Unbelievable
2003	Ronnie Coleman: The Cost of Redemption
2006	Ronnie Coleman: Relentless
2008	Ronnie Coleman: Invincible
2009	Ronnie Coleman: The Last Training Video
2018	Ronnie Coleman: The King

== See also ==
- List of male professional bodybuilders

Preceded by Dorian Yates	Mr. Olympia; 1998–2005	Succeeded by Jay Cutler
