= 1998 Mr. Olympia =

Bodybuilding competition

The 1998 Mr. Olympia contest was an IFBB professional bodybuilding competition held on October 10, 1998, at Madison Square Garden in New York City, New York.

== Results ==
The total prize money awarded was $300,000.

Place	Prize	Name	1	2	3	4	Points
1	$110,000	(United States) Ronnie Coleman	17	5	5	5	32
2	$50,000	(United States) Flex Wheeler	5	10	10	10	35
3	$35,000	(Serbia and Montenegro) Nasser El Sonbaty	11	16	17	16	60
4	$25,000	(United States) Kevin Levrone	23	21	20	20	84
5	$20,000	(United States) Shawn Ray	18	22	24	25	89
6	$14,000	(United States) Chris Cormier	40	30	30	30	130
7	$13,000	(Australia) Lee Priest	30	35	35		100
8	$12,000	(United Kingdom) Ernie Taylor	53	40	42		135
9	$11,000	(United States) Mike Matarazzo	54	48	52		154
10	$10,000	(Switzerland) Jean-Pierre Fux	53	51	53		157
11		(Federal Republic of Yugoslavia) Miloš Šarčev	61	56	61		178
12		(United States) Johnny Moya	60	62	62		184
13		(Trinidad and Tobago) Darrem Charles	69	63	61		193
14		(United States) Aaron Baker	73	67	56		196
15		(Germany) Günter Schlierkamp	77	73	69		219
16		(Lebanon) Ahmad Haidar	84	80	83		247
17		(Canada) Claude Groulx	88	82	82		252
		(Canada) Paul Dillett	35				

== Notable events ==
- Dorian Yates, who sustained a severe triceps injury before winning the 1997 Mr. Olympia, announced his retirement leaving way for a new champion
- Ronnie Coleman surprised the field by winning the title over the more established favorites, Flex Wheeler, Nasser El Sonbaty, Kevin Levrone and Shawn Ray. He leapt a record eight places from his 9th place finish the year before.
- Paul Dillett was suffering from severe dehydration and passed out after just 10 minutes of pre-judging, and dropped out of the competition
