= Markus Rühl =

German bodybuilder (born 1972)

- Professional bodybuilder
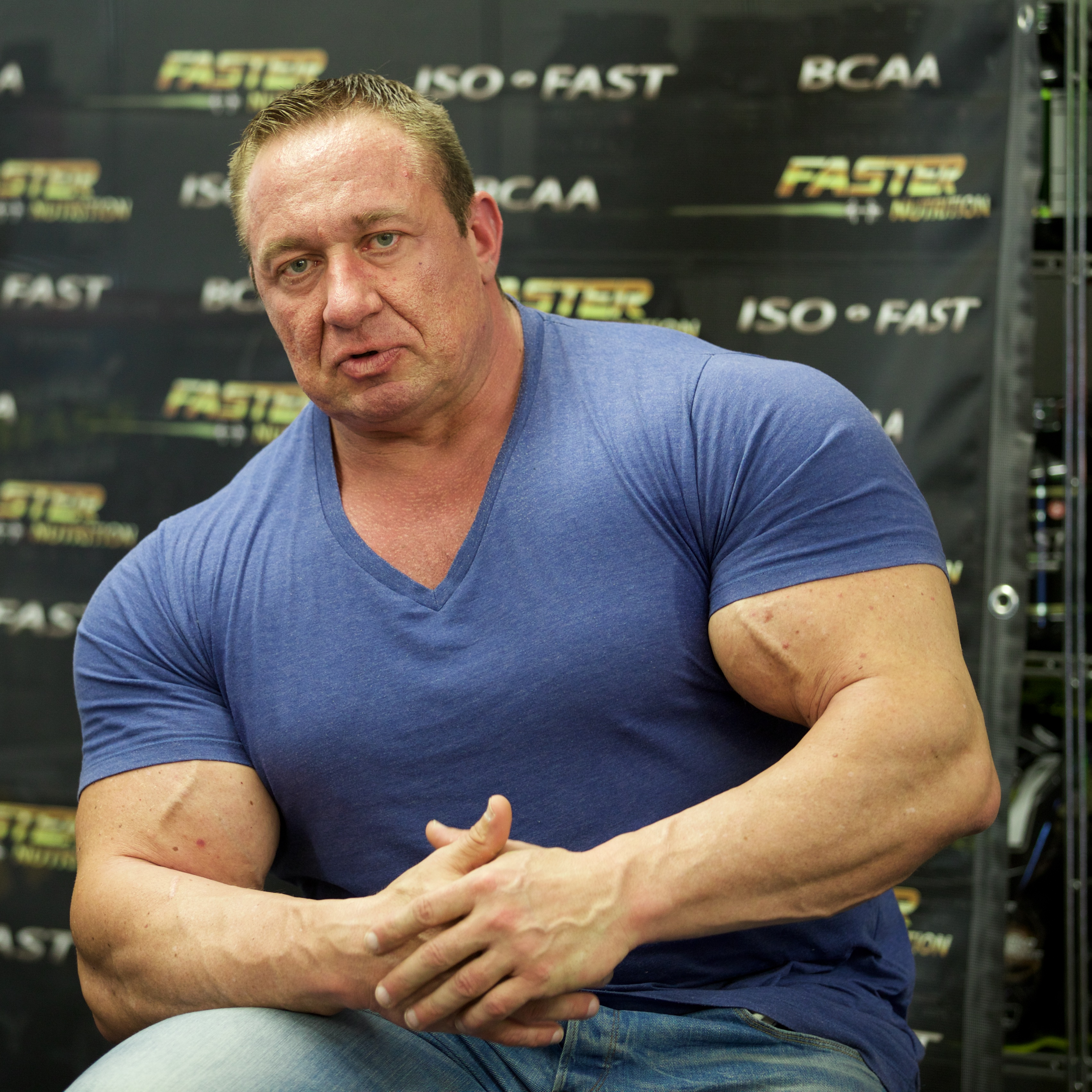
- Rühl at Faster Nutrition, in Zürich 2016

Personal info
- Nickname: The Freak
- Born: February 22, 1972 (age 54); Roßdorf, Darmstadt, West Germany

Best statistics
- Height: 5 ft 10 in (1.78 m)
- Weight: Contest: 120–132 kg (265–291 lb); Off season: 140–148 kg (309–326 lb)

Professional (Pro) career
- Pro-debut: 1999
- Best win: 2002 Night of Champions
- Active: 1995–2011

Markus Rühl (born 22 February 1972, in Roßdorf, Darmstadt, West Germany) is a retired IFBB professional bodybuilder, who is widely regarded as one of the biggest "mass monster" bodybuilders of all time.

== Early life ==
Rühl began training at the age of 18 following a doctor's recommendation to build some muscles in his legs after sustaining an injury in his left knee while playing soccer. Starting with a bodyweight of 54.5 kg (120 lb), Rühl began training hard six days a week. In five years he started competing at professional level.

He also worked as a used-car salesman and an office clerk.

== Bodybuilding career ==
In 1997, Rühl won the Hessian state championship and the German championship as an amateur. He then received the IFBB professional card and started bodybuilding as his profession. At the 1997 Pro Grand Prix in Germany he took 10th place. His on stage weight was 117 kg (258 lb).

In 1998, Rühl took 9th place at the Night of Champions with an on stage weight of 120 kg (265 lb). In 1999 IFBB English Grand Prix he placed 7th, took 4th place at the 1999 Night of Champions and qualified for the 1999 Mr. Olympia but tested positive for diuretics and was disqualified.

In 2000, he excelled his placings at the Night of Champions to 2nd place, placed 5th on 2000 English Grand Prix and won 2000 Toronto Pro. At 2000 Mr. Olympia he placed 7th behind Ronnie Coleman, Kevin Levrone, Flex Wheeler, Shawn Ray, Nasser El Sonbaty and Lee Priest. In 2001 Mr. Olympia Rühl hit a downfall with 14th place.

In 2002 Night of Champions, Rühl brought up his best physique ever weighing a staggering 129.5 kg (285 lb) on-stage, massive and ripped to easily win the competition. Numerous critiques and fans rate this version of Rühl to be one of the freakiest and best bodybuilding physiques of all-time.

In 2003 Arnold Classic Rühl emerged 3rd and placed 5th in 2004 Mr. Olympia behind Coleman, Jay Cutler, Gustavo Badell and Dexter Jackson, which is his highest placing ever at the Olympia. He weighed 127 kg (280 lb) on stage.

Among Rühl's higher placings thereafter were 3rd in 2006 IFBB Austria Pro Grand Prix and again 3rd in 2009 New York Pro. His final Olympia was the 2009 Mr. Olympia competition.

== Other ventures ==
From 2006 to 2007, Rühl ran a sports studio in Kelsterbach together with his colleague Stefan Hammerschmiedt. He signed sponsorship deals with Ultimate Nutrition in 2008, BMS in 2014 and All Stars Supplements in 2015. He also ran a fitness studio called 'Rühl's fit&fun' in Darmstadt-Nord until 2017. In 2018 Rühl started his own supplement company 'Rühl's Bestes'.

== Personal life ==
On 31 August 2017, Rühl married Alicja. They have a daughter.

== Physical statistics ==
- Height: 1.78 m (5 ft 10 in)
- Contest weight: 120–132 kg (265–291 lb)
- Off-season weight: 140–148 kg (309–326 lb)
- Chest/ Back: 150 cm (59 in)
- Arms: 61 cm (24 in)
- Legs: 85–88 cm (33–35 in)
- Waist: 91–97 cm (36–38 in)

== Bodybuilding chronology ==
Year	Competition	Result
1998	Night of Champions	9th
1999	English Grand Prix	7th
1999	Night of Champions	4th
1999	Mr. Olympia	DQ (Note: Rühl was disqualified from the 1999 Mr. Olympia contest after testing positive for diuretics.)
1999	Joe Weider's Pro World	7th
2000	Toronto Pro	1st
2000	Night of Champions	2nd
2000	English Grand Prix	5th
2000	Joe Weider's World Pro Cup	5th
2000	Mr. Olympia	7th
2001	Mr. Olympia	14th
2002	Toronto Pro Classic	2nd
2002	Night of Champions	1st
2002	Mr. Olympia	8th
2003	Arnold Classic	3rd
2004	Mr. Olympia	5th
2005	Mr. Olympia	15th
2006	Santa Susanna Pro	2nd
2006	Mr. Olympia	8th
2006	Austria Pro Grand Prix	3rd
2009	New York Pro	3rd
2009	Mr. Olympia	15th
2010	Europa Super Show	7th

== Filmography ==
Year	Film	Ref.
2000	Markus Rühl: XXXL	
2004	Markus Rühl: Made in Germany	
2007	Markus Rühl: Big and loving it	
2010	Markus Rühl: Ruhling 4 Ever	

== See also ==
- List of male professional bodybuilders
- List of female professional bodybuilders
