= Kerry Kayes =

British bodybuilder

Kerry Thomas Kayes (born 3 April 1950) is a former British bodybuilding champion, bodybuilding show promoter, nutrition and strength coach and ex-owner of the supplement company CNP Professional and Betta Bodies gym.

== Bodybuilding ==
Kayes started his bodybuilding career in 1967. He reached the peak of his competitive career in 1994 when he became the EFBB (later UKBFF) British Champion. He has been a member of the EFBB (UKBFF) executive committee for 15 years and in 2009 was given the lifetime achievement award by the UKBFF.

Kayes was the promoter of six IFBB British Grand Prix bodybuilding contests – three in Manchester, England and three at Wembley Stadium in London, England and has promoted the last ten EFBB (UKBFF) Northwest Bodybuilding shows in Warrington, England. He has also sponsored many UK Strongman contests, through Glenn Ross. Kayes sponsors at least 10 UK bodybuilding shows every year through CNP Professional and has financed the British bodybuilding magazine The Beef for over 8 years. Kerry, together with his wife Janet founded Betta Bodies Gymnasium in Denton, Manchester in July 1987 and some of the top names in the last three decades of bodybuilding have trained or visited there including Dexter Jackson, Jay Cutler, Mustafa Mohammad, Phil Heath, Kevin Levrone, Shawn Ray, Chris Cormier, Gunther Schlierkamp, Bertil Fox, Dennis James, Tom Platz, Lee Priest, Ernie Taylor, Joanna Thomas, Sonny Schmidt, Mike Quinn, Robby Robinson, Frank Richardson, Paul Dillett, Samir Bannout, Lou Ferrigno and Dorian Yates. The gym was under Kayes' control until 2012 when Bobby Rimmer took over.

== Training and advice ==
In 2000 Kayes wrote weight loss diets for Ricky Hatton and other Billy Graham boxers. At the request of Billy Graham (Ricky Hatton's boxing coach), Kayes became the strength and nutrition coach for light welterweight boxing champion Ricky Hatton in 2002; his main responsibilities being to make Hatton stronger and helping him to make weight, no small task given Hatton's love of junk food between fights. It is widely reported that Hatton sometimes balloons up by more than 40 lbs over his fighting weight. He achieved this through a strict training routine and diet consisting of a mixture of food and CNP professional nutrition supplements.

Prior to the Hatton link up Kayes was already being sought out by athletes away from bodybuilding, especially boxers needing to make weight, as his experience in bodybuilding gave him knowledge that could be adapted easily to other sports. He has personally trained or advised hundreds of professional and amateur boxers including Ricky & Matthew Hatton, Matthew Macklin, John and Joe Murray, Jamie Moore, Alex Arthur, Kevin Mitchell, Anthony Farnell, David Price, Frankie Gavin, Tony Jeffries and the Cambridge University Boxing Club for their 100th varsity match with Oxford.

In recent times, Kayes has linked up with Joe Gallagher in the creation of the Gallagher's Gym, attached to his Betta Bodies Gymnasium with a stable of exciting fighters for the future.

Recently, Kerry has been sought out for advice and nutrition products by Anthony McGann & Lee Gwynn from the Wolfslair Mixed Martial Art Academy for its stable of fighters including Michael Bisping, Paul Kelly, Mario Sukata, Hall of Famer Mark Coleman (one of only five UFC hall of famers) and Quinton "Rampage" Jackson.

Kayes regularly gives advice to both individual athletes and clubs, he has been a guest lecturer and given seminars to many Premiership Football and Rugby Clubs, has given advice to the Ericsson Round The World Yacht Racing Team in Lanzarote. He gives advice to the snooker champion Ronnie O'Sullivan, and the Speedway rider Carl Stonehewer.

He regularly holds small seminars on nutrition at his CNP offices and travels extensively around the country giving large group training and nutrition seminars in other gymnasiums and prisons. He has been a guest lecturer for the Cambridge University Boxing Club.

Kayes was a guest lecturer at the Drugs in Sport conference in Liverpool on 2 July 1996 where he gave advice on the subject to police and probation officers, community drug workers, gym owners, medics, academics and athletes. Kayes regularly advises young people against steroid use.

He has been the source of many prints and web articles and was featured in two recent web articles on Bodybuilding.com a two time fortune 500 company and the largest health, fitness information and sports supplement company in the world who currently exceed over 240,000 visits per day and where he was named Trainer of the Month.

Kayes has appeared in the HBO Emmy award winning television program 24/7, featuring the buildup to the Ricky Hatton, Floyd Mayweather bout in December 2007.

He has recently appeared in a documentary film called 12 Weeks. The documentary is about the ex Coronation Street actor Scott Wrights 12-week transformation and appearance as a guest poser at the UKBFF Northwest bodybuilding show in 2008.

In early 2010, Kayes announced that his company CNP professional would begin making custom sports nutrition products for Team GB Cycling and the Team Sky Pro Cycling team; the latter made its debut on the road in 2010.

In December 2012, Kerry Kayes was invited to lecture at the World Football Academy: UK National Symposium in London on a variety of topics relating to nutrition for footballers, including how to combat dehydration, fuel your performance, make a rapid recovery and what not to eat for footballers. Videos produced by Four Four Two Performance featuring Kayes on these topics can be seen here,,,.

== Care in the community ==
Kayes, through his Sports Supplements company CNP Professional has offered jobs to prisoners who are coming to the end of their sentences, providing day release places then permanent positions once they have been released.

== Tragedy ==
Kayes appeared on the front page of the Monday, 13 May 1985 edition of the Telegraph & Argus in a photo that depicted him comforting a woman at the scene of the Bradford City Football Club fire disaster. He was working at the time for Yorkshire Television, covering the event for The Big Match.

He was tasked with informing Simon Robinson, a bodybuilder whom he had been mentoring, that his leg had been amputated when he awoke from a coma after a car accident on 25 March 1998. Following his recovery, Robinson continued his bodybuilding, ultimately receiving a standing ovation at the 2003 Mr. Olympia Contest, where he appeared as a guest poser.
