= 1994 Mr. Olympia =

Bodybuilding competition held in Atlanta, Georgia

The 1994 Mr. Olympia contest was an IFBB professional bodybuilding competition held on September 10, 1994, at the Atlanta Civic Center in Atlanta, Georgia.

== Results ==
The total prize money awarded was $275,000.

Place	Prize	Name
1	$100,000	(United Kingdom) Dorian Yates
2	$50,000	(United States) Shawn Ray
3	$30,000	(United States) Kevin Levrone
4	$25,000	(Canada) Paul Dillett
5	$15,000	(United States) Porter Cottrell
6	$12,000	(United States) Chris Cormier
7	$8,000	(Serbia and Montenegro) Nasser El Sonbaty
8	$7,000	(Barbados) Charles Clairmonte
9	$6,000	(Austria) Andreas Münzer
10	$5,000	(Australia) Sonny Schmidt
11	$1,000	(United States) Alq Gurley
12	$1,000	(United States) Aaron Baker
13	$1,000	(Federal Republic of Yugoslavia) Miloš Šarčev
14	$1,000	(France) Thierry Pastel
15	$1,000	(United States) Ronnie Coleman
16	$1,000	(United States) John Sherman
17	$1,000	(Germany) Achim Albrecht
18	$1,000	(Germany) Roland Cziurlok
18	$1,000	(Lebanon) Samir Bannout
18	$1,000	(United States) David Dearth
18	$1,000	(United States) Mike Quinn
18	$1,000	(Germany) Günter Schlierkamp
18	$1,000	(Canada) Henderson Thorne

== Notable events ==
- Dorian Yates won his third consecutive Mr. Olympia title despite sustaining a torn left biceps several weeks before the competition, a deformation on his left biceps was easily visible.
- Because of Dorian Yates' injury, controversy arose as many believe Shawn Ray should have been the rightful winner.
