= 1999 Mr. Olympia =

Professional bodybuilding competition

The 1999 Mr. Olympia contest was an IFBB professional bodybuilding competition held October 23, 1999 at the Mandalay Bay Arena in Las Vegas, Nevada. This was the first Mr. Olympia staged in Las Vegas, its home for all but three Olympias since then.

== Results ==
The total prize money awarded was $311,000.

Place	Prize	Name	1	2	3	4	Points
1	$110,000	(United States) Ronnie Coleman	5	5	5	5	20
2	$50,000	(United States) Flex Wheeler	10	10	10	10	40
3	$40,000	(United States) Chris Cormier	15	15	15	15	60
4	$30,000	(United States) Kevin Levrone	31	22	23	25	101
5	$20,000	(United States) Shawn Ray	29	24	24	26	103
6	$15,000	(Serbia and Montenegro) Nasser El Sonbaty	22	30	30	24	106
7	$13,000	(Canada) Paul Dillett	27	37	38		102
8	$12,000	(Australia) Lee Priest	45	41	39		125
9	$11,000	(United States) Dexter Jackson	41	43	49		133
10	$10,000	(Federal Republic of Yugoslavia) Miloš Šarčev	54	59	48		161
11		(United States) Mike Matarazzo	58	61	59		178
12		(United Kingdom) Ernie Taylor	66	68	59		193
13		(Czech Republic) Pavol Jablonický	63	67	69		199
14		(United States) Jay Cutler	72	67	65		204
15		(Switzerland) Jean-Pierre Fux	79	80	80		239
DQ		(Germany) Markus Rühl	61	60	69		190

== Notable events ==
- Ronnie Coleman won his second consecutive Mr. Olympia title.
- In his Olympia debut, Markus Rühl originally placed 12th, but later tested positive for diuretics and was disqualified.
- Porter Cottrell withdrew from the contest due to a firefighting accident that occurred a few weeks earlier.
- Future Mr. Olympias Jay Cutler and Dexter Jackson made their Olympia debuts.

== See also ==
- 1999 Ms. Olympia
