= Mike Matarazzo =

American bodybuilder (1965–2014)

- Professional bodybuilder

Personal info
- Nickname: "Big Guns"
- Born: November 8, 1965
- Died: August 16, 2014 (aged 48)

Best statistics
- Height: 5 ft 10 in (1.78 m)
- Weight: (In Season): 250 lb (Off-Season): 275 lb

Professional (Pro) career
- Active: 1991-2001

Michael Richard Matarazzo (November 8, 1965 – August 16, 2014) was an American IFBB professional bodybuilder.

== Biography ==
Originally from Boston, Massachusetts, Matarazzo took up boxing after being inspired by Rocky. He turned to bodybuilding and won the first contest he entered: The 1989 Gold's Gym Classic in Massachusetts. He moved to Venice, California, in early 1991 and in a great surprise, won the USA Championships that year over favorite Flex Wheeler as well as Ronnie Coleman and Chris Cormier. It was only his second bodybuilding contest and it earned 25-year-old Matarazzo the right to turn pro. He also competed for the first time in the Mr. Olympia contest in 1991. Known primarily for his massive arms and calves, his best placing in the Mr. Olympia competition (out of seven total appearances) was 9th in 1998.

Matarazzo's last appearance in a professional bodybuilding event was the 2001 Mr. Olympia where he placed 21st. He was forced to retire due to having open heart surgery on December 8, 2004 for clogged arteries. On November 8, 2007 Matarazzo suffered a heart attack, his second cardiac-related problem since his 2004 surgery. On August 3, 2014, Matarazzo was in the intensive care unit of Stanford hospital in Palo Alto due to heart complications. He died on August 16 while awaiting a heart transplant. At the time of his death he was residing in Modesto, California and had been forced to stop working as a bail bondsman due to his 20% heart function.

== Contest history ==
- 1989 Gold's Gym Classic, 1st
- 1991 NPC USA Championships, Heavyweight, 1st and Overall
- 1991 Mr. Olympia, 16th
- 1992 Arnold Classic, 15th
- 1992 Ironman Pro Invitational, 5th
- 1993 Marissa Classic, 6th
- 1993 Night of Champions, 8th
- 1993 Mr. Olympia, 18th
- 1993 Pittsburgh Pro Invitational, 2nd
- 1994 Arnold Classic, 9th
- 1994 San Jose Pro Invitational, 8th
- 1995 Florida Pro Invitational, 7th
- 1995 South Beach Pro Invitational, 7th
- 1996 Grand Prix Czech Republic, 9th
- 1996 Grand Prix Russia, 9th
- 1996 Grand Prix Switzerland, 9th
- 1996 Night of Champions, 5th
- 1996 Mr. Olympia, 13th
- 1997 Canada Pro Cup, 2nd
- 1997 Grand Prix Germany, 11th
- 1997 Grand Prix Hungary, 10th
- 1997 Grand Prix Spain, 10th
- 1997 Night of Champions, 4th
- 1997 Mr. Olympia, 13th
- 1997 Toronto Pro Invitational, 2nd
- 1998 Night of Champions, 3rd
- 1998 Mr. Olympia, 9th
- 1998 San Francisco Pro Invitational, 7th
- 1998 Toronto Pro Invitational, 3rd
- 1999 Mr. Olympia, 11th
- 2000 Night of Champions, 18th
- 2000 Toronto Pro Invitational, 6th
- 2001 Night of Champions, 5th
- 2001 Mr. Olympia, 21st

== See also ==
- Arnold Classic
- List of male professional bodybuilders
- List of female professional bodybuilders
- Mr. Olympia
