= 2002 Mr. Olympia =

Bodybuilding competition

The 2002 Mr. Olympia contest was an IFBB professional bodybuilding competition held October 16–20, 2002 at the Mandalay Bay Arena in Las Vegas, Nevada.

== Results ==
The total prize money awarded was $381,000. A 2003 Cadillac Escalade was presented to the first-place winner by Mel Rich and Steve Stern of the Bodyonics Pinnacle company which donated the prize. The crowd was not happy when Gunter's position was announced at 5th.

Place	Prize	Name	Country	1	2	3	4	Points
1	$110,000	Ronnie Coleman	(United States)	5	5	11	8	29
2	$75,000	Kevin Levrone	(United States)	15	11	5	7	38
3	$50,000	Chris Cormier	(United States)	10	14	18	17	59
4	$40,000	Dexter Jackson	(United States)	22	20	25	26	93
5	$30,000	Günter Schlierkamp	(Germany)	51	28	17	17	113
6	$25,000	Lee Priest	(Australia)	42	29	28	28	127
7	$15,000	Flex Wheeler	(United States)	23	41	45		109
8	$14,000	Markus Rühl	(Germany)	43	37	36		116
9	$12,000	Orville Burke	(United States)	37	37	55		129
10	$10,000	Dennis James	(Germany)	37	50	44		131
11		Craig Titus	(United States)	54	57	54		165
12		Art Atwood	(United States)	64	64	58		186
13		Ahmad Haidar	(Lebanon)	68	69	65		202
14		Ernie Taylor	(United Kingdom)	75	63	69		207
15		Nasser El Sonbaty	(Serbia and Montenegro)	71	78	73		222
16		Darrem Charles	(Trinidad and Tobago)	80	76	80		236
17		Shahriar Kamali	(Iran)	69	91	80		240
18		Bob Cicherillo	(United States)	94	86	80		260
19		George Farah	(Lebanon)	97	98	80		275
20		Francisco Bautista	(Spain)	99	99	80		278
21		Claude Groulx	(Canada)	101	102	80		283
22		Tommi Thorvildsen	(Norway)	114	109	80		303
23		Jaroslav Horvath	(Slovakia)	113	116	80		309
24		Gustavo Badell	(Venezuela)	116	117	80		313
25		Don Youngblood	(United States)	122	124	80		326

== Notable events ==
- Ronnie Coleman won his fifth consecutive Mr. Olympia title

== See also ==
- 2002 Ms. Olympia
