= 1992 Mr. Olympia =

Bodybuilding competition held in Helsinki, Finland

The 1992 Mr. Olympia contest was an IFBB professional bodybuilding competition held on September 12, 1992, at the Helsinki Ice Hall in Helsinki, Finland. Dorian Yates won his first of six straight Mr. Olympia titles.

== Results ==
The total prize money awarded was $275,000.

Place	Prize	Name
1	$100,000	(United Kingdom) Dorian Yates
2	$50,000	(United States) Kevin Levrone
3	$30,000	(United States) Lee Labrada
4	$25,000	(United States) Shawn Ray
5	$15,000	(Algeria) Mohammed Benaziza
6	$12,000	(United States) Vince Taylor
7	$8,000	(Australia) Sonny Schmidt
8	$7,000	(United States) Porter Cottrell
9	$6,000	(United States) Ron Love
10	$5,000	(France) Thierry Pastel
11		(Canada) Steve Brisbois
12		(United States) Lou Ferrigno
13		(United States) Alq Gurley
14		(Canada) Henderson Thorne
15		(France) Francis Benfatto
16		(Lebanon) Samir Bannout
16		(United States) Ronnie Coleman
16		(Poland) Mirosław Daszkiewicz
16		(United States) Jose Guzman
16		(Finland) Juhani Herranen
16		(Barbados) Patrick Nicholls
16		(Socialist Federal Republic of Yugoslavia) Milos Sarcev

== Notable events ==
- Ronnie Coleman, a future eight-time champion, made his Mr. Olympia debut. He did not place.
- Kevin Levrone also debuted and finished second.
- Lou Ferrigno returned to the Olympia at 41 after a record 17 years away.
- Lee Haney, eight-time Mr. Olympia, had retired that summer.
- This was the last Mr. Olympia, to date, to be staged outside the USA.
