= 2000 Mr. Olympia =

Professional bodybuilding event in Las Vegas

The 2000 Mr. Olympia contest was an IFBB professional bodybuilding competition held October 20–22, 2000 at the Mandalay Bay Arena in Las Vegas, Nevada.

== Results ==
The total prize money awarded was $325,000.

Place	Name	1	2	3	4	Points
1	(United States) Ronnie Coleman	5	5	5	5	20
2	(United States) Kevin Levrone	12	10	10	10	42
3	(United States) Flex Wheeler	13	16	16	15	62
4	(United States) Shawn Ray	20	19	17	20	76
5	(Serbia and Montenegro) Nasser El Sonbaty	27	25	31	28	111
6	(Australia) Lee Priest	41	35	29	27	132
7	(Germany) Markus Rühl	38	32	36		106
8	(United States) Jay Cutler	39	44	47		130
9	(United States) Dexter Jackson	39	48	50		137
10	(United States) Orville Burke	53	48	46		147
11	(Germany) Dennis James	53	48	46		148
12	(Germany) Günter Schlierkamp	56	60	58		174
13	(Ukraine) Oleg Zhur	65	65	65		195

== Notable events ==
- Ronnie Coleman won his third consecutive Mr. Olympia title
- Chris Cormier, third-place finisher in 1999, was injured four weeks before the competition

== See also ==
- 2000 Ms. Olympia
