= 1997 Mr. Olympia =

Bodybuilding competition

The 1997 Mr. Olympia contest was an IFBB professional bodybuilding competition held on September 20, 1997, at the Terrace Theater in Long Beach, California.

== Results ==
Total prize amount awarded was $285,000.

Place	Prize	Name
1	$110,000	(United Kingdom) Dorian Yates
2	$50,000	(Federal Republic of Yugoslavia) Nasser El Sonbaty
3	$30,000	(United States) Shawn Ray
4	$25,000	(Canada) Paul Dillett
5	$15,000	(Australia) Lee Priest
6	$10,000	(United States) Kevin Levrone
7	$8,000	(Switzerland) Jean-Pierre Fux
8	$7,000	(United States) Chris Cormier
9	$6,000	(United States) Ronnie Coleman
10	$5,000	(Federal Republic of Yugoslavia) Miloš Šarčev
11		(United States) Mike Francois
12		(Barbados) Charles Clairmonte
13		(United States) Mike Matarazzo

== Notable events ==
- Dorian Yates won his sixth consecutive Mr. Olympia title despite tearing his left triceps three weeks before the competition
- Flex Wheeler withdrew from the competition after he was car-jacked by two thieves, whom he fought, and scared off, but not before he had taken on some bruises and damages to his arm
- This year the contest involved a two-day format, prejudging Friday night, and finals Saturday night, last time this happened was 1989
- During the competition Kevin Levrone was placed 6th, Lee Priest 5th and Paul Dillett 4th, 2 hours after the competition the results were amended
