= 1993 Mr. Olympia =

Professional bodybuilding competition

The 1993 Mr. Olympia contest was an IFBB professional bodybuilding competition held on September 11, 1993, at the Atlanta Civic Center in Atlanta, Georgia.

== Results ==
The total prize money awarded was $275,000.

Place	Prize	Name
1	$100,000	(United Kingdom) Dorian Yates
2	$50,000	(United States) Flex Wheeler
3	$30,000	(United States) Shawn Ray
4	$25,000	(United States) Lee Labrada
5	$15,000	(United States) Kevin Levrone
6	$12,000	(Canada) Paul Dillett
7	$8,000	(Barbados) Charles Clairmonte
8	$7,000	(Australia) Sonny Schmidt
9	$6,000	(Austria) Andreas Münzer
10	$5,000	(United States) Lou Ferrigno
11		(Federal Republic of Yugoslavia) Miloš Šarčev
12		(United States) J.J. Marsh
13		(Italy) Flavio Baccianini
14		(United States) Ron Love
15		(United States) Ray McNeil
16		(Italy) Mauro Sarni
17		(Turkey) Hamdullah Aykutlu
18		(Netherlands) Arthur Buurman
18		(Slovakia) Pavel Grolmus
18		(United States) Mike Matarazzo
18		(Austria) Johann Schatz
18		(United States) John Sherman

== Notable events ==
- Dorian Yates won his second consecutive Mr. Olympia title
- Lou Ferrigno makes his final Mr. Olympia appearance
- Ray McNeil would only appear at this Mr Olympia before his murder in 1995.
