= Kenneth Wheeler =

Kenneth Wheeler may refer to:

- Kenneth Wheeler (politician) (1912–1996), Australian politician, Speaker of the Victorian Legislative Assembly
- Kenny Wheeler (1930–2014), Canadian musician and composer
- Flex Wheeler (Kenneth Wheeler, born 1965), American bodybuilder
