= Nasser El Sonbaty =

German Egyptian bodybuilder (1965–2013)

- Professional bodybuilder
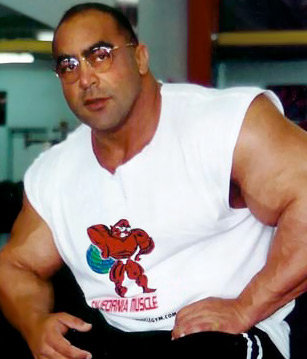

Personal info
- Nickname: The Professor
- Born: October 15, 1965; Stuttgart, West Germany
- Died: March 20, 2013 (aged 47); Cairo, Egypt

Best statistics
- Height: 5 ft 11 in (1.80 m)
- Weight: Contest: 265–290 lb (120–131 kg); Off season: 300–338 lb (136–152kg)

Professional (Pro) career
- Best win: IFBB Arnold Classic; 1999

Nasser El Sonbaty (Arabic: ناصر السنباطي; born 15 October 1965 – 20 March 2013) was an IFBB professional bodybuilder. He represented FR Yugoslavia at competitions. Born in Stuttgart, Sonbaty began bodybuilding in 1983. His first appearance in the Mr. Olympia competition was in 1994, where he placed 7th. His best placing in the Mr. Olympia competition was in 1997, where in a controversial result he placed 2nd behind Dorian Yates. Many bodybuilders, including Jay Cutler and Ronnie Coleman, agree he deserved 1st place in that year's contest. After placing 2nd in the Arnold Classic twice, in 1997 and 1998, he won the title in 1999, defeating Kevin Levrone. He was known for his shoulder development.

== Early life ==
Sonbaty was born in the German city of Stuttgart to an Egyptian father and a Yugoslav mother from Novi Pazar, Serbia. Sonbaty was a graduate of the University of Augsburg with a degree in history, political science, and sociology. He had two sisters and two brothers.

== Career ==
Sonbaty began bodybuilding in 1983. His first competition was a Junior State Championship in Germany in 1985, where he placed 6th. His first appearance in the Mr. Olympia competition was in 1994, where he placed 7th. In total, Sonbaty competed in 13 amateur shows and 53 IFBB Pro shows. He qualified for 10 consecutive Mr. Olympia contests and entered nine Mr. Olympia competitions. His best placing in the Mr. Olympia competition was in 1997, where he placed 2nd.

Sonbaty was known for posing and training while wearing his trademark round spectacles; alongside his fluency in several languages (Serbo-Croatian, Arabic, English, French, Italian, Spanish, and German), this is likely the basis for his nickname, "The Professor". Despite weighing over 300 lbs in the offseason, he could still show his full abdominal muscles. He has been featured in many international fitness and bodybuilding magazines, articles as well as being pictured on over 60 covers.

== Influence and legacy ==
Sonbaty is widely regarded as one of the most impactful bodybuilders of his generation, whose dedication to the sport continued to inspire many after his death. Further, Sonbaty's influence on the Arab bodybuilding community is particularly significant, as he is credited with inspiring future generations of athletes from similar backgrounds.

== Personal life ==
Sonbaty split his time between San Diego, California and Costa Mesa, California. He died in his sleep during a visit to Cairo on March 20, 2013.

== Stats ==
- Height: 180 cm (5 ft 11 in)
- Competition weight: between 265 lbs (120 kg) and 290 lbs (131 kg)
- Off Season weight: between 300 lbs (136 kg) and 315 lbs (143 kg)

== Pro contest history ==
- 1990 Grand Prix Finland - 8th
- 1990 Grand Prix France - 7th
- 1990 Grand Prix Holland - 8th
- 1991 Night of Champions - Did not place
- 1992 Chicago Pro Invitational - 19th
- 1992 Night of Champions - Did not place
- 1993 Grand Prix France - 3rd
- 1993 Grand Prix Germany - 3rd
- 1994 Grand Prix France - 4th
- 1994 Grand Prix Germany - 4th
- 1994 Night of Champions - 2nd
- 1994 Mr. Olympia - 7th
- 1995 Grand Prix England - 4th
- 1995 Grand Prix France - 3rd
- 1995 Grand Prix Germany - 3rd
- 1995 Grand Prix Russia - 3rd
- 1995 Grand Prix Spain - 3rd
- 1995 Grand Prix Ukraine - 2nd
- 1995 Houston Pro Invitational - 1st
- 1995 Night of Champions - 1st
- 1995 Mr. Olympia - 3rd
- 1996 Grand Prix Czech Republic - 1st
- 1996 Grand Prix England - 2nd
- 1996 Grand Prix Germany - 2nd
- 1996 Grand Prix Russia - Winner
- 1996 Grand Prix Spain - 3rd
- 1996 Grand Prix Switzerland - 1st
- 1996 Mr. Olympia - 3rd
- 1997 Arnold Classic - 2nd
- 1997 Grand Prix Czech Republic - 3rd
- 1997 Grand Prix England - 3rd
- 1997 Grand Prix Finland - 4th
- 1997 Grand Prix Germany - 2nd
- 1997 Grand Prix Hungary - 2nd
- 1997 Grand Prix Russia - 3rd
- 1997 Grand Prix Spain - 2nd
- 1997 Mr. Olympia - 2nd
- 1997 San Jose Pro Invitational - 2nd
- 1998 Arnold Classic - 2nd
- 1998 Grand Prix Finland - 3rd
- 1998 Grand Prix Germany - 3rd
- 1998 Mr. Olympia - 3rd
- 1999 Arnold Classic - 1st
- 1999 Grand Prix England - 6th
- 1999 Mr. Olympia - 6th
- 1999 World Pro Championships - 6th
- 2000 Mr. Olympia - 5th
- 2001 Mr. Olympia - 9th
- 2002 Arnold Classic - 10th
- 2002 Mr. Olympia - 15th
- 2004 Night of Champions - 15th
- 2004 Show of Strength Pro Championship - 14th
- 2005 Europa Supershow - 14th

== Training videos ==
- Nasser On The Way - Video Part I - 1999
- Nasser On The Way - Video Part II - 2000
- Nasser On The Way - Video Part III - 2001
- Nasser On The Way - Video Part IV - 2002
- Nasser On The Way - Video Part V - 2003
- Nasser On The Way - Video Part VI - 2004
- Nasser On The Way - Video Part VII - 2005

== See also ==
- List of male professional bodybuilders
