= Ingrid Romero =

Spanish-born American fitness coach and model

- Born: Ingrid Romero; July 10, 1985 (age 41); Tarragona, Spain
- Occupations: Fitness Coach and Model
- Known for: Fitness Competition
- Website: Ingrid Romero

Ingrid Romero (born July 10, 1985) is an international fitness model, fitness competitor, and fitness coach. Training & Fitness Magazine called her "one of the most recognized faces in the fitness industry," and "one of the most accomplished female fitness stars ever."

== Early life ==
Ingrid Romero was born and raised in a poor part of Tarragona, Spain and began modeling when she was eleven years old. She has two sisters and a brother who live in Spain: Sara, Marian and Nico. At seventeen, she moved to London, England, with aspirations of being a model, but only worked in a restaurant for a year because her English was not very good. Romero returned to Spain and gained fifty pounds. Shortly thereafter, she moved to Dublin, Ireland where she worked in retail, lost all the weight that she had gained and resumed her modeling career.

After three years in Ireland, Romero moved to Cancun, Mexico—where she worked as a model. She then moved to Los, Angeles, California. After seeing her progress in training, she decided to enter fitness competitions.

== Fitness & modeling career ==
In 2010, Romero appeared in her first National Physique Committee fitness competition, in which she took 1st place (and the overall). After her first competition, she went on to win several National Physique Committee fitness competitions. In 2011, Romero won the Arnold Classic (bikini). After winning the Arnold Classic, she earned a WBFF pro-card from Paul Dillett, but quickly left the WBFF and returned to IFBB/NPC because Romero felt that Dillett mislead her with false promises.

During Romero's last show, which she won, she was pregnant with twin boys. Romero had a difficult pregnancy. She was on bed rest for several months in order to carry the babies. With the help of her husband—in seven months—Romero was back in shape.

In 2012, Romero and her husband at that time founded Team Edge which helped women prepare for bikini competitions. Romero started the team while she was pregnant. The Edge program covers everything from nutrition, to supplementation, to training, to posing and everything in between. Since 2012, Romero makes and sells custom-designed fitness bikinis. After having success with Team Edge, Romero produced a video about shaping and building the buttocks called Edge Booty Extreme.

Ingrid Romero regularly works as a fitness model. Romero has been on many magazine covers including Oxygen Magazine, Glam Today Magazine, Training & Fitness, Olympian's Mind & Body News, and Wheels & Heels Magazine. She has been featured as model in Oxygen Magazine, for Trimmed and Toned, and many other publications. She also writes about fitness.
