= 1996 Mr. Olympia =

Professional bodybuilding competition

The 1996 Mr. Olympia contest was an IFBB professional bodybuilding competition held on September 21, 1996, at the Arie Crown Theater in Chicago, Illinois, United States of America.

== Results ==
The total prize money awarded was $275,000.

Place	Prize	Name
1	$110,000	(United Kingdom) Dorian Yates
2	$50,000	(United States) Shawn Ray
3	$30,000	(United States) Kevin Levrone
4	$25,000	(United States) Flex Wheeler
5	$15,000	(Canada) Paul Dillett
6	$12,000	(United States) Ronnie Coleman
7	$8,000	(United States) Chris Cormier
8	$7,000	(Switzerland) Jean-Pierre Fux
9	$6,000	(Barbados) Charles Clairmonte
10	$5,000	(United States) Mike Francois
11		(United States) Aaron Baker
12		(Germany) Roland Cziurlok
13		(United States) Mike Matarazzo
DQ		(Serbia and Montenegro) Nasser El Sonbaty

== Notable events ==
- Dorian Yates won his fifth consecutive Mr. Olympia title
- Nasser El Sonbaty came in third in scoring, but was disqualified the next month for testing positive for a banned diuretics drug.
