= 2001 Mr. Olympia =

Professional bodybuilding competition

The 2001 Mr. Olympia contest was an IFBB professional bodybuilding competition held October 26–28, 2001 at the Mandalay Bay Arena in Las Vegas, Nevada.

== Results ==
The total prize money awarded was $400,000

Place	Prize	Name	1	2	3	4	Points
1	$110,000	(United States) Ronnie Coleman	9	9	5	5	28
2	$60,000	(United States) Jay Cutler	6	6	10	10	32
3	$40,000	(United States) Kevin Levrone	19	22	15	20	76
4	$35,000	(United States) Shawn Ray	21	15	21	23	80
5	$30,000	(United States) Chris Cormier	19	22	24	18	83
6	$25,000	(United States) Orville Burke	30	35	35	30	130
7	$15,000	(Germany) Dennis James	36	37	41		114
8	$14,000	(United States) Dexter Jackson	43	39	41		123
9	$12,000	(Serbia and Montenegro) Nasser El Sonbaty	41	42	53		136
10	$10,000	(Iran) Shahriar Kamali	52	48	45		145
11		(United States) Melvin Anthony	55	56	59		170
12		(United States) Craig Titus	61	58	62		181
13		(United States) Vince Taylor	77	65	45		187
14		(Germany) Markus Rühl	62	71	71		204
15		(Germany) Günter Schlierkamp	75	77	76		228
16		(United States) Tom Prince	78	83	86		247
17		(United Kingdom) J.D. Dawodu	89	83	94		266
18		(Trinidad and Tobago) Darrem Charles	92	94	84		270
19		(Czech Republic) Pavol Jablonický	96	97	94		287
20		(Canada) Claude Groulx	94	96	98		288
21		(United States) Mike Matarazzo	101	96	95		292

== Notable events ==
- Ronnie Coleman won his fourth consecutive Mr. Olympia title
- Jay Cutler and Markus Rühl tested positive for banned diuretics however the results were discarded after it was discovered the drug testing laboratory employed by the IFBB was no longer designated as an official accredited lab by the International Olympic Committee

== See also ==
- 2001 Ms. Olympia
