= Günter Schlierkamp =

German bodybuilder (born 1970)

- Professional bodybuilder

Personal info
- Born: February 2, 1970 (age 56); Olfen, Nordrhein-Westfalen, West Germany

Best statistics
- Height: 6 ft 1 in (1.85 m)
- Weight: (In Season) 295–300 lb (Off-Season) 325–330 lb

Professional (Pro) career
- Pro-debut: IFBB World Amateur Championships; 1993
- Best win: IFBB GNC Show of Strength Champion; 2002
- Predecessor: None
- Successor: Dexter Jackson
- Active: 1990–2006

Günter Schlierkamp (born 2 February 1970) is a German IFBB professional bodybuilder. Schlierkamp was born in Olfen, Nordrhein-Westfalen, Germany, where he grew up on a farm. In 1996 he married Carmen Jourst and moved to the United States, but they divorced in 2003. Four years later, he married American personal trainer Kim Lyons in March 2007.

After a fourth place showing at the 2005 Mr. Olympia contest, Schlierkamp started training with trainer Charles Glass. Schlierkamp had trained with Glass in 2002, and finished above 8-time Mr. Olympia Ronnie Coleman at the GNC Show of Strength. Hoping to gain an edge for the 2006 Mr. Olympia Title by training with Glass, Schlierkamp did not manage to improve on the previous year's finish and ended in 10th place. In 2006 he had a role in an American movie Beerfest, released by the Broken Lizard comedy group.

== Stats ==
- Location: Hermosa Beach, California, US
- Date of birth: February 2, 1970
- Place of birth: Olfen, Germany
- Height: 6 ft 1 1/2 in (1.87 m)
- Contest weight: 295–300 lb (133–136 kg)
- Off-season weight: Around 325–330 lb (147–150 kg)

== Competitive history ==
- 1990 German Championships - Overall Winner
- 1990 German Championships - 1st, Junior Tall
- 1992 IFBB European Amateur Championships - 1st, HeavyWeight
- 1992 German Championships - 1st, Heavyweight
- 1993 IFBB World Amateur Championships - 1st, HeavyWeight
- 1994 IFBB Grand Prix England - 8th
- 1994 IFBB Grand Prix Germany - 8th
- 1994 Mr. Olympia - 19th
- 1995 IFBB Canada Pro Cup - 2nd
- 1995 IFBB Grand Prix Ukraine - 10th
- 1996 Arnold Classic - 11th
- 1996 Night of Champions - 11th
- 1996 San Jose Pro Invitational - 9th
- 1997 IFBB Canada Pro Cup - 6th
- 1997 Ironman Pro Invitational - Disqualified
- 1997 Night of Champions - 9th
- 1997 San Jose Pro Invitational - 11th
- 1998 Grand Prix Finland - 6th
- 1998 Grand Prix Germany - 6th
- 1998 Night of Champions - 10th
- 1998 Mr. Olympia - 15th
- 1998 San Francisco Pro Invitational - 9th
- 1998 Toronto Pro Invitational - 6th
- 1999 Arnold Classic - 9th
- 1999 Ironman Pro Invitational - 5th
- 2000 Ironman Pro Invitational - 4th
- 2000 Arnold Classic - 6th
- 2000 Joe Weider's World Pro Cup - 6th
- 2000 Grand Prix England - 4th
- 2000 Mr. Olympia - 12th
- 2001 Toronto Pro - 6th
- 2001 Night of Champions XXIII - 9th
- 2001 Mr. Olympia - 15th
- 2001 British Grand Prix - 10th
- 2002 Mr. Olympia - 5th
- 2002 GNC Show of Strength - 1st
- 2003 Mr. Olympia - 5th
- 2003 English Grand Prix - 3rd
- 2003 Holland Grand Prix - 4th
- 2003 GNC Show of Strength - 5th
- 2004 Arnold Classic - 4th
- 2004 Mr. Olympia - 6th
- 2005 Mr. Olympia - 4th
- 2006 Mr. Olympia - 10th

== See also ==
- Arnold Classic
- List of male professional bodybuilders
- List of female professional bodybuilders
- Mr. Olympia
- Kim Lyons, his second and current wife, a former trainer on The Biggest Loser
- The International Federation of BodyBuilders, to which both Gunter and Kim belong.
