= 1995 Mr. Olympia =

Bodybuilding competition

The 1995 Mr. Olympia contest was an IFBB professional bodybuilding competition held on September 10, 1995, at the Atlanta Civic Center in Atlanta, Georgia.

== Results ==
The total prize money awarded was $275,000.

Place	Prize	Name
1	$110,000	(United Kingdom) Dorian Yates
2	$50,000	(United States) Kevin Levrone
3	$30,000	(Socialist Federal Republic of Yugoslavia) Nasser El Sonbaty
4	$25,000	(United States) Shawn Ray
5	$15,000	(United States) Vince Taylor
6	$12,000	(United States) Chris Cormier
7	$8,000	(United States) Mike Francois
8	$7,000	(United States) Flex Wheeler
9	$6,000	(United States) Aaron Baker
10	$5,000	(Barbados) Charles Clairmonte
11		(United States) Ronnie Coleman
12		(United States) Paul DeMayo
13		(Australia) Sonny Schmidt
14		(United Kingdom) Ian Harrison
15		(Trinidad and Tobago) Darrem Charles
15		(Czech Republic) Pavol Jablonický

== Notable events ==
- Dorian Yates won his fourth consecutive Mr. Olympia title
