= Dennis James (bodybuilder) =

German-American professional bodybuilder

- Professional bodybuilder

Personal info
- Nickname: The Menace
- Born: May 31, 1966 (age 60); Heidelberg, West Germany

Best statistics
- Height: 5 ft 8 in (1.72 m)
- Weight: 258 lb (117 kg)

Professional (Pro) career
- Pro-debut: Night of Champions; 1999
- Best win: Mr. Olympia; 2003 / 4th
- Active: No

Dennis Tyron James (born May 31, 1966) is a German-American retired IFBB Pro bodybuilder.

== Early life ==
James was born in Heidelberg on May 31, 1966, the son of an African-American soldier of the United States Army stationed in Heidelberg and a German woman. He started training in bodybuilding when he was 18 years old.

== Stats (2012) ==
- Height: 172 cm
- Legs: 79 cm

== Career ==
James won the International South German Championship in 1985, the International German Grand Prix in 1986, and the 1986 New York State Championship All Junior Category. He stopped training because he was not eligible to join the German Nationals since he did not hold German citizenship but made a comeback in 1990 after he left Germany.

The first National Physique Committee (NPC) competition of James was the NPC Junior USA of 1996, where he placed 13th. In 1999, he competed in his first Night of Champions, where he tied 14th. The following year, in 2000, he competed in his first Arnold Classic, placing 4th.

His first Mr. Olympia was in 2000 as well, where he placed 11th. He has competed in a total of seven Mr. Olympias, with his highest placing coming in 4th in 2003.

In 2010, James said that the 2010 Mr. Olympia would be his last competition. He also said that he had lied about his age in the past and that he will be "45 years old soon".

He announced the end of his competitive career in 2012. He has continued to train and mentor other bodybuilders.

=== Competition appearances ===
- 1993 NABBA Mr. Universe, Medium-Tall, 4th
- 1994 NABBA Mr. Universe, Medium-Tall, 2nd
- 1995 NABBA Mr. Universe, Medium-Tall, 1st
- 1996 NPC Junior USA, Light-HeavyWeight, 13th
- 1996 NABBA Universe - Pro, 2nd
- 1997 NPC Junior Nationals, Light-HeavyWeight, 6th
- 1997 NPC Nationals, HeavyWeight, 4th
- 1998 NPC USA Championships, Super-HeavyWeight, 1st and Overall
- 1999 Night of Champions, 15th
- 2000 Arnold Classic, 4th
- 2000 Grand Prix England, 3rd
- 2000 Grand Prix Hungary, 3rd
- 2000 Ironman Pro Invitational, 7th
- 2000 Mr. Olympia, 11th
- 2000 World Pro Championships, 4th
- 2001 Arnold Classic, 3rd
- 2001 Grand Prix Australia, 2nd
- 2001 Grand Prix England, 3rd
- 2001 Grand Prix Hungary, 1st
- 2001 Mr. Olympia, 7th
- 2002 Arnold Classic, 7th
- 2002 Grand Prix England, 2nd
- 2002 Grand Prix Holland, 4th
- 2002 Mr. Olympia, 10th
- 2002 Show of Strength Pro Championship, 5th
- 2003 Mr. Olympia, 4th
- 2003 Show of Strength Pro Championship, 4th
- 2004 Mr. Olympia, 8th
- 2005 Charlotte Pro Championships, 2nd
- 2005 Mr. Olympia, 6th
- 2006 New York Pro Championships, 3rd
- 2006 Mr. Olympia, 9th
- 2006 Grand Prix Austria, 4th
- 2007 New York Pro, 2nd
- 2007 Colorado Pro Championships, 8th
- 2008 IFBB Tampa Bay Pro, 2nd
- 2008 IFBB Europa Super Show, 2nd
- 2009 IFBB Arnold Classic, 7th
- 2009 IFBB New York Pro Show, 2nd
- 2009 IFBB Tampa Pro, 1st
- 2009 Europa Super Show, 1st
- 2010 Mr. Olympia 11th
- 2012 Masters Mr. Olympia 3rd
