= Tommi Thorvildsen =

Norwegian bodybuilder

Tommi Thorvildsen, nicknamed "Glutezilla" for his glute development, is an IFBB Pro bodybuilder from Norway. At 178 centimetres (5 ft 10 in) in height, he has a contest weight of 260 pounds (120 kg) and an off-season weight of 290 pounds (130 kg) and went on from winning his first amateur competition in 1997, the Sandefjord Open, to win the national championships in the same year. He got his pro card after two successive wins of the Norwegian championships in 1997 and 1998. His first professional competition was the Toronto Pro Invitational in 2000, where he placed 18th. His highest professional ranking so far was the 2002 IFBB Austrian Grand Prix of Bodybuilding, where he placed 3rd, (2009 BATTLE OF GIANTS UPBF, 2ND)

He was born in Norway on May 30, 1974 and raised in Tvedestrand in Aust-Agder county in the southeastern coast of Norway. He has his own supplement line, Tommi Nutrition, and owns and operates a gym in Oslo.

== Stats ==
- Name: Tommi Thorvildsen
- Location: Oslo, Norway
- Current residence: Norway
- Place of Birth: Norway. Tommi was born in Norway, and grew up in Tvedestrand Municipality (population: 5,000), on the southeastern coast of Norway
- Birthday: 1974-05-30
- Height: 178 centimetres (70 in)
- Zodiac: Gemini
- Off-season weight: 130 kilograms (290 lb), heaviest weight: 141 kilograms (311 lb)
- Competition weight: 117–120 kilograms (258–265 lb), heaviest weight: 126 kilograms (278 lb) in 2009 Sapri Italy
- Biceps: 57.5 centimetres (22.6 in) pumped
- Waist: 84 centimetres (33 in)
- Thighs: 84 centimetres (33 in)
- Gym: 24fitness
- Bench press: 8 x 200 kilograms (440 lb)
- Squat in Smith machine: 12 x 320 kilograms (710 lb)
- Motto: "Pain is temporary, pride is forever! Good luck with your training! Good luck and work hard and remember DEDICATION is the key!"
- Brothers: Jan-Espen, Kai and Geir

== Competition history ==
Sources: Bodybuilding pro.com, bodybuilding.com

- Sandefjord Open, 1997 (1st)
- Oslo Grand Prix 1997 (1st)
- Danish Invitational, 1997 (3rd)
- Oslo Global Invitational, 1997 (1st)
- Oslo Bodybuilding Trophy, 1997 (2nd)
- Norwegian Championships, 1997 (Overall, 1st)
- Norwegian Championships, 1998 (Overall, 1st)
- Oslo Grand Prix 1999 (1st)
- 1999 European invitational champion, Belgium (1st)
- Toronto Pro Invitational, 2000 (18th)
- England Grand Prix, 2000 (9th)
- Toronto Pro Invitational, 2001 (4th)
- Night of the Champions, 2001 (6th)
- 2001 IFBB ENGLISH GRAND PRIX (7th)
- New Zealand Grand Prix, 2001 (4th) wildcard entry for Arnold Classic
- Arnold Schwarzenegger Classic, 2002 (11th)
- Grand Prix Austria, 2002 (3rd)
- Ironman Pro Invitational, 2002 (6th)
- San Francisco Pro Invitational, 2002 (6th)
- Mr. Olympia, 2002, (22nd)
- 2002 IFBB ENGLISH GRAND PRIX (6th)
- 2002 IFBB DUTCH GRAND PRIX (8th)
- 2003 IFBB Iron Man Pro (13th)
- 2003 IFBB Arnold Classic And Internationals (12th)
- 2003 IFBB San Francisco Pro (12th)
- 2003 IFBB Grand Prix Australia (5th)
- Night of Champions, 2003 (19th)
- 2003 IFBB Grand Prix Hungary (13th)
- 2004 IFBB Toronto Pro (7th)
- 2004 IFBB Grand Prix Russia (7th)
- 2004 IFBB Grand Prix Holland (10th)
- 2004 IFBB Grand Prix England (9th)
- 2006 IFBB New York Pro (did not place)
- 2006 IFBB Grand Prix Holland (11th)
- 2006 IFBB Santa Susanna Pro (13th)
- 2007 IFBB Montreal Pro Classic (14th)
- 2007 IFBB Santa Susanna Pro (10th)
- 2008 IFBB 15th Annual Sports/Fitness Weekend & Europa IFBB Super Show (17th)
- 2008 IFBB Atlantic City Pro (16th)
- 2008 IFBB Romanian Pro Grand Prix (13th)
- 2009 BATTLE OF GIANTS UPBF (2ND)
