= Don Youngblood =

American bodybuilder (1954-2005)

- Professional bodybuilder

Personal info
- Nickname: Don
- Born: April 7, 1954; Alma, Arkansas, U.S.
- Died: May 8, 2005 (aged 51)

Best statistics
- Height: 5 ft 9 in (1.75 m)
- Weight: Contest: 245 lb (111 kg); Off-season: 295 lb (134 kg)

Professional (Pro) career
- Pro-debut: 1994
- Best win: IFBB Masters Olympia; 2002

Don Youngblood (April 7, 1954 – May 8, 2005) was an American IFBB professional bodybuilder.

== Early life ==
Youngblood started his trucking career in the mid-1970s as a driver for the Southern Pacific Railroad in Bakersfield, California. In Alma, Arkansas, he founded SDS Transportation Services.

== Bodybuilding ==
In 1987, after 13 years of business building, Youngblood decided to train seriously. In 1994 Youngblood took 1st in the Arkansas State Masters competition, and in 1995 became the Arkansas Overall State Champion at age 41. Within three months, he won the overall title at the NPC Masters Nationals. When the Masters Nationals winner was later granted a pro qualification, Youngblood received a pro card retrospectively. He was now qualified for the Joe Weider IFBB Masters Olympia contest, which had been dominated by Vince Taylor for several years. Youngblood took 2nd place at the 2001 contest, which Taylor won. In 2002, in Lynchburg, Virginia, he won the Masters Olympia, dethroning Taylor as the pro masters champ.

- 1994 NPC Arkansas State Masters - 1st (overall winner)
- 1995 NPC Arkansas State Overall - 1st (overall winner)
- 1995 NPC Masters Nationals, Heavyweight, 1st (overall winner)
- 2001 IFBB Masters Olympia, 2nd
- 2002 IFBB Masters Olympia, 1st (overall winner)
- 2002 IFBB Olympia, 25th

== Death ==
Youngblood died in his home in Alma on May 8, 2005, of a massive heart attack.

== See also ==
- List of male professional bodybuilders
- List of female professional bodybuilders
