= Chris Cormier =

American bodybuilder (born 1967)

- Professional bodybuilder

Personal info
- Full name: Broderick Christopher Cormier
- Born: August 19, 1967 (age 59); Palm Springs, California, U.S.

Best statistics

Professional (Pro) career
- Active: 1987–2007

Broderick Christopher "Chris" Cormier (born August 19, 1967) is a retired American bodybuilder who competed in the International Federation of Bodybuilding and Fitness.

== Biography ==
He was born in Palm Springs, California. In 1984, he placed 4th in the 167 pound weight group at the California Interscholastic Federation State High School Wrestling Championships for Palm Springs High School. Cormier's first Mr. Olympia came in 1994, where he placed 6th. The same year he also participated in his first Arnold Classic and the Ironman Pro Invitational, where he placed 4th and 2nd respectively. In 1995 he competed in his first Night of Champions tournament (now called the New York Pro), where he placed 6th. Cormier has been featured in many fitness and bodybuilding magazines, including being featured on the cover of Muscular Development magazine.

In mid-2006 Cormier was hospitalized with an infected spine resulting from a bodybuilding-related injury before he was due to train with veteran English bodybuilder and ex-Mr. Olympia, Dorian Yates. His recovery included extensive physiotherapy but the injury, and a subsequent one involving his triceps, forced his retirement.

Since then he has turned his efforts into working with athletes all over the world, sharing the knowledge and expertise he gained over his 30+ years in the sport, which included competing in over 72 IFBB competitions, with 12 professional wins and first runner-up a record 6 times at the prestigious Arnold Classic (2000-05). His website is www.thegrind.guru.

In 2019, a documentary film called Chris Cormier: I Am the Real Deal, about Chris' life and career was to be released.

Cormier has one son with ex fitness model and reality television star Ahmo Hight.

== Competition history ==
- 1987 NPC California Championships, Teenage division, 1st
- 1987 NPC Teen Nationals, Light-Heavyweight, 1st
- 1991 NPC USA Championships, Heavyweight, 4th
- 1993 NPC USA Championships, Heavyweight, 1st and Overall
- 1994 Arnold Classic, 4th
- 1994 Grand Prix France, 7th
- 1994 Grand Prix Germany, 6th
- 1994 Ironman Pro Invitational, 2nd
- 1994 Mr. Olympia, 6th
- 1995 Grand Prix England, 5th
- 1995 Grand Prix France, 5th
- 1995 Grand Prix Germany, 4th
- 1995 Grand Prix Russia, 5th
- 1995 Grand Prix Spain, 4th
- 1995 Grand Prix Ukraine, 4th
- 1995 Night of Champions, 4th
- 1995 Mr. Olympia, 6th
- 1996 Grand Prix Czech Republic, 8th
- 1996 Grand Prix England, 8th
- 1996 Grand Prix Germany, 7th
- 1996 Grand Prix Russia, 8th
- 1996 Grand Prix Spain, 8th
- 1996 Grand Prix Switzerland, 8th
- 1996 Mr. Olympia, 7th
- 1997 Canada Pro Cup, 3rd
- 1997 Grand Prix Czech Republic, 2nd
- 1997 Grand Prix England, 2nd
- 1997 Grand Prix Finland, 2nd
- 1997 Grand Prix Germany, 6th
- 1997 Grand Prix Hungary, 8th
- 1997 Grand Prix Russia, 4th
- 1997 Grand Prix Spain, 6th
- 1997 Night of Champions, 1st
- 1997 Mr. Olympia, 8th
- 1997 Toronto Pro Invitational, 3rd
- 1998 Arnold Classic, 5th
- 1998 Grand Prix Finland, 4th
- 1998 Grand Prix Germany, 4th
- 1998 Mr. Olympia, 6th
- 1999 Arnold Classic, 3rd
- 1999 Ironman Pro Invitational, 1st
- 1999 Mr. Olympia, 3rd
- 2000 Arnold Classic, 2nd
- 2000 Ironman Pro Invitational, 1st
- 2001 Arnold Classic, 2nd
- 2001 Grand Prix Australia, 1st
- 2001 Grand Prix England, 2nd
- 2001 Grand Prix Hungary, 2nd
- 2001 Grand Prix New Zealand, 2nd
- 2001 Ironman Pro Invitational, 1st
- 2001 Mr. Olympia, 5th
- 2001 San Francisco Pro Invitational, 1st
- 2002 Arnold Classic, 2nd
- 2002 Grand Prix Australia, 1st
- 2002 Grand Prix Austria, 1st
- 2002 Grand Prix England, 3rd
- 2002 Grand Prix Holland, 2nd
- 2002 Ironman Pro Invitational, 1st
- 2002 Mr. Olympia, 3rd
- 2002 San Francisco Pro Invitational, 2nd
- 2002 Show of Strength Pro Championship, 3rd
- 2003 Arnold Classic, 2nd
- 2003 Grand Prix Australia, 1st
- 2003 San Francisco Pro Invitational, 2nd
- 2003 Show of Strength Pro Championship, 7th
- 2004 Arnold Classic, 2nd
- 2004 Grand Prix Australia, 2nd
- 2004 Grand Prix England, 2nd
- 2004 Grand Prix Holland, 2nd
- 2004 Mr. Olympia, 7th
- 2005 Arnold Classic, 2nd
- 2005 Grand Prix Australia, 2nd
- 2005 Mr. Olympia, 13th
- 2005 San Francisco Pro Invitational, 1st
- 2007 IFBB Montreal Pro Classic, 4th

== See also ==
- List of male professional bodybuilders
- List of female professional bodybuilders
