= Porter Cottrell =

American bodybuilder

Porter Cottrell (born 1962, in Louisville, Kentucky) is an American former professional bodybuilder who competed in the IFBB.

== Career ==
Cottrell took up bodybuilding at the age of 12, inspired by Steve Reeves. He won the light-heavyweight class at the 1991 NPC Nationals and won his first two professional contests in 1992, at one of them, in Chicago, he beat Kevin Levrone, who was making his professional debut. In 1993 he won all three of his contests, and in 1994 he placed third at the Arnold Classic and fifth at the Mr. Olympia. During his competitive career he also worked as a firefighter in Louisville. He retired from bodybuilding in 1999 and from firefighting in 2009, and as of 2017 he worked as a personal trainer.

== Contest history ==
- 1988 Junior Nationals - NPC, Overall Winner
- 1988 Junior Nationals - NPC, Light-HeavyWeight, 1st
- 1989 Nationals - NPC, Light-HeavyWeight, 3rd
- 1991 Nationals - NPC, Light-HeavyWeight, 1st
- 1992 Chicago Pro Invitational - IFBB, 1st
- 1992 Grand Prix England - IFBB, 5th
- 1992 Grand Prix Germany - IFBB, 4th
- 1992 Grand Prix Holland - IFBB, 7th
- 1992 Grand Prix Italy - IFBB, 5th
- 1992 Niagara Falls Pro Invitational - IFBB, 1st
- 1992 Night of Champions - IFBB, 2nd
- 1992 Olympia - IFBB, 8th
- 1993 Chicago Pro Invitational - IFBB, 1st
- 1993 Night of Champions - IFBB, 1st
- 1993 Pittsburgh Pro Invitational - IFBB, 1st
- 1994 Arnold Classic - IFBB, 3rd
- 1994 Grand Prix England - IFBB, 9th
- 1994 Grand Prix Germany - IFBB, 7th
- 1994 Grand Prix Spain - IFBB, 5th
- 1994 Olympia - IFBB, 5th
- 1994 San Jose Pro Invitational - IFBB, 2nd
- 1996 Arnold Classic - IFBB, 8th
- 1996 San Jose Pro Invitational - IFBB, 10th
- 1998 Night of Champions - IFBB, 6th
- 1998 San Francisco Pro Invitational - IFBB, 6th
- 1998 Toronto Pro Invitational - IFBB, 4th
- 1999 Night of Champions - IFBB, 9th
- 1999 Toronto Pro Invitational - IFBB, 3rd
