= Shawn Ray =

American bodybuilder (born 1965)

Shawn I. Ray
- Professional bodybuilder
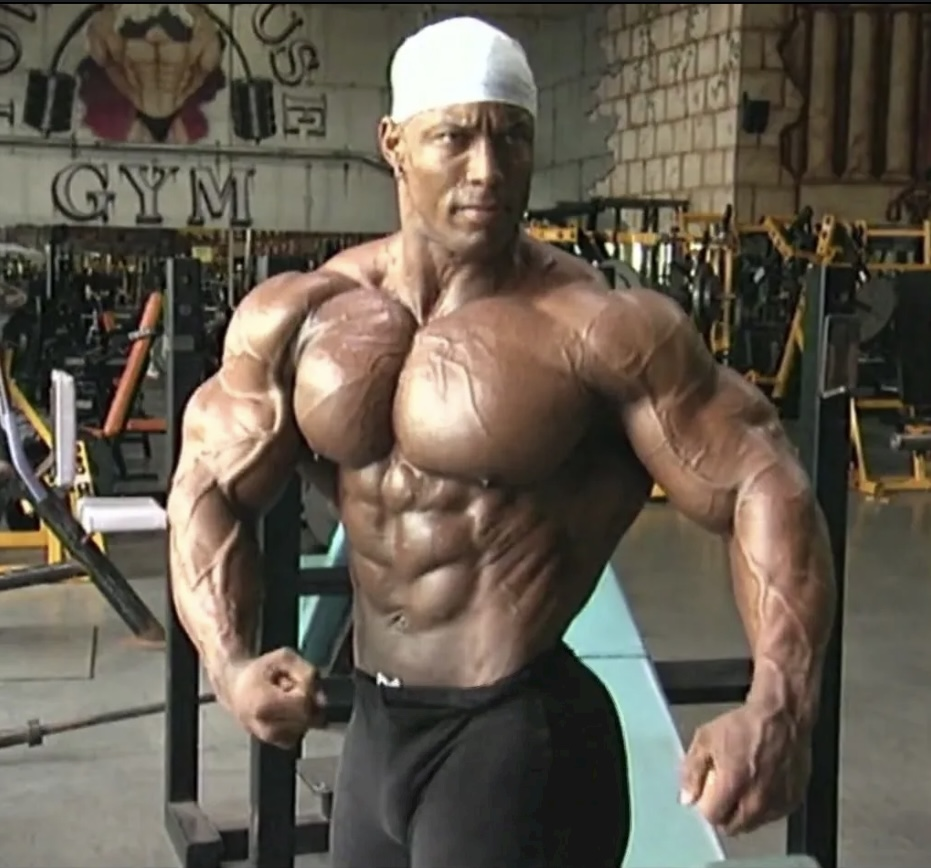

Personal info
- Nickname: Sugar
- Born: September 9, 1965 (age 61); Fullerton, California, U.S.

Best statistics
- Height: 5 ft 6 in (1.68 m)
- Weight: Contest: 205–215 lb Off season: 225–235 lb

Professional (Pro) career
- Pro-debut: IFBB Night of Champions; 1988
- Best win: IFBB Arnold Classic; 1991
- Predecessor: Mike Ashley
- Successor: Vince Taylor
- Active: 1988–2001

Shawn I. Ray (born September 9, 1965) is a former professional bodybuilder and author.

== Bodybuilding career ==
Ray is referenced in The New Encyclopedia of Modern Bodybuilding by Bill Dobbins and Arnold Schwarzenegger. He authored a book titled The Shawn Ray Way on Bodybuilding. Ray has appeared on the cover of Flex magazine more times than any other bodybuilder and has been featured in various fitness and bodybuilding publications worldwide. He co-hosted the Flex Magazine Workout on ESPN for five years and served as a commentator for bodybuilding competitions on ESPN for eight years.

In 2006 and 2007, Ray promoted the Shawn Ray Colorado Pro/Am Classic Contest-Expo in Denver, Colorado. He also produced a DVD titled Fitness After 40, focusing on regaining fitness in later life. Ray later wrote for Digital Muscle Media and hosted the Mr. Olympia pay-per-view event. He also created a video documentary titled Evolution of Bodybuilding – The Movie.

== Personal life ==
Ray married in 2003 and his daughter, Asia Monet was born on August 10, 2005. In 2008, Ray and his wife, Kristie, welcomed their second daughter.

In retirement, Ray has been continuously involved with bodybuilding through muscle camps, seminars, grand openings, and master of ceremonies for contests. Ray has also promoted the New York Pro contest in New York City. He was a global ambassador for supplement company Mutant and the editor-in-chief for Digital Muscle Media.

== Mr. Olympia contest history ==
- 1988 Mr. Olympia – 13th Place
- 1990 Mr. Olympia – 3rd Place
- 1991 Mr. Olympia – 5th Place
- 1992 Mr. Olympia – 4th Place
- 1993 Mr. Olympia – 3rd Place
- 1994 Mr. Olympia – 2nd Place
- 1995 Mr. Olympia – 4th Place
- 1996 Mr. Olympia – 2nd Place
- 1997 Mr. Olympia – 3rd Place
- 1998 Mr. Olympia – 5th Place
- 1999 Mr. Olympia – 5th Place
- 2000 Mr. Olympia – 4th Place
- 2001 Mr. Olympia – 4th Place

== Titles and honours ==
- 1983 California Gold Cup
- 1984 Mr. Teenage Los Angeles (short & overall)
- 1984 Teenage Mr. California
- 1985 Teenage Mr. Orange County
- 1985 Teenage National Championships
- 1985 Jr. World Championships
- 1986 Jr. National Championships (Light heavy, 12th place)
- 1987 Mr. California (Light heavy & overall)
- 1987 National Championships (Light heavy & overall)
- 1990 Pro Ironman Champion
- 1990 Arnold Classic Champion (lost title due to failing drug test)
- 1991 Arnold Classic Champion
- Inducted into the IFBB Hall of Fame of professional bodybuilding in January 2007.
- Received Ben Weider Lifetime Achievement Award 2020.
- In October 2003, El Dorado High School in Placentia, Calif. inducted Ray into its "Football Hall of Fame" In 1983, He set the school's all-time rushing record and record for longest run from scrimmage (98 yards), both of which still stand.
