= Flex Wheeler =

American bodybuilder

Kenneth "Flex" Wheeler
- Professional bodybuilder
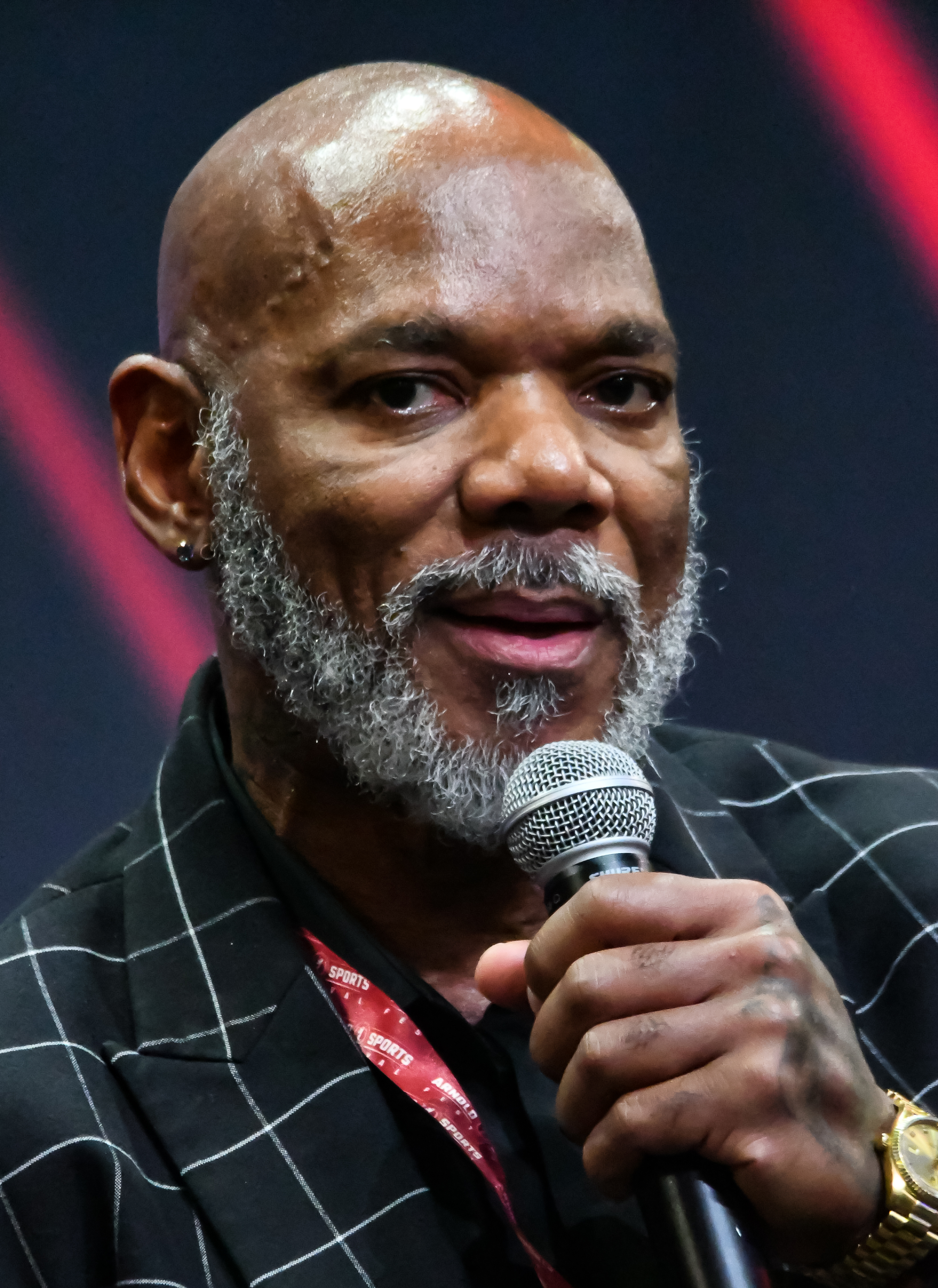
- Wheeler in 2023

Personal info
- Nickname: Flex
- Born: August 23, 1965 (age 61); Fresno, California, U.S.

Best statistics
- Height: 5 ft 9 in (1.75 m)
- Weight: contest: 212–240 lb (96–109 kg) off season: 265–275 lb (120–125 kg)

Professional (Pro) career
- Pro-debut: IFBB World Amateur Championships; 1990
- Best win: IFBB Arnold Classic; 1993, 1997–1998, 2000
- Predecessor: Vince Taylor
- Successor: Kevin Levrone (1994); Ronnie Coleman (2001)

Kenneth "Flex" Wheeler (born August 23, 1965) is an American retired IFBB professional bodybuilder. He won the Arnold Classic a then-record four times and was once described by Arnold Schwarzenegger as one of the greatest bodybuilders he had ever seen. Ronnie Coleman has stated that Wheeler was the best bodybuilder he competed against.

== Biography ==
=== Early life ===
Wheeler was born and raised in Fresno, California. He grew up in poverty. As a child, Wheeler experienced child abuse and suicidal tendencies. He struggled in school due to dyslexia, but excelled in sports. Wheeler began training in martial arts, and started bodybuilding as a teenager after discovering weight training. He considers himself as a "martial artist first, a bodybuilder second."

=== Bodybuilding career ===
After a short career as a police officer, Wheeler focused full-time on becoming a professional bodybuilder. He competed for the first time in 1983, but it was not until 1989 that he secured a first-place trophy at the NPC Mr. California Championships. He placed second at the 1993 Mr. Olympia, narrowly missing a win. He is a 5-time Ironman Pro winner, 4-time Arnold Classic winner, and has won the France Grand Prix, South Beach Pro Invitational, Night of Champions, and Hungarian Grand Prix.

While Wheeler had the reputation of being arrogant and overconfident, he attributed this to a need to compensate for his introversion and insecurity as a child and young man. In 1994, he was involved in a near-fatal car accident that could have left him with lifelong paralysis. Falling back into depression again, he started training from scratch, returning with remarkable speed to bodybuilding's top tier. In 1999, Wheeler discovered that he had focal segmental glomerulosclerosis, a form of kidney disease. Despite press speculation as to the cause of the failure, Wheeler pointed out that the condition is hereditary, although drug use probably accelerated its onset. Wheeler announced his retirement from competitive bodybuilding in 2000, but continued to compete until 2003.

Flex made a comeback at the 2017 Mr. Olympia, competing in the Classic Physique division, and finished at 15th place.

=== Post-retirement ===
After retirement, Wheeler focused again on martial arts, his favorite being Kenp-Kwon-Do, a variant of Kenpo, Tae Kwon Do, and Aikido. In 2003, he received a kidney transplant; he then went on to participate in a demonstration fight at the 2005 Arnold Classic. In 2007, Flex was interviewed by freelance journalist Rod Labbe for Ironman Magazine's Legends of Bodybuilding series. Entitled "Yesterday and Today," it covers his extensive career and reveals how people can conquer adversity and triumph against incredible odds. Flex is now the owner of Flex Wheeler Nutrition and has a podcast called Flex for life.

In October 2019, Flex underwent amputation of his right leg below the knee due to circulatory vascular system problems. Wheeler said the decision to amputate was "due to escalating circulation difficulties in my right leg that had become life-threatening."

Some medical professionals assert that what led to the need for Wheeler's lower leg amputation was an accumulation of pre-existing medical conditions involving the Focal segmental glomerulosclerosis he acquired hereditarily, leg injuries he received in his martial arts training, his car crash in 1994, and his kidney transplant in 2003, which together long-term resulted in the circulation issues.

== Stats ==
- Height: 178 cm (5 ft 10 in)
- Off-season Weight: 125 kg (276 lb)
- Competition Weight: 109 kg (240 lb)
- Arm Size: 58cm (22.83 in)
- Leg Size: 80 cm (31 in)
- Chest size: 138 cm (54 in)

== Amateur ==
- 1985 Teen America (Medium Tall, 1st)
- 1989 Contra Costa Championship (Light Heavyweight 1st, Overall 1st)
- 1989 California Championships (Light Heavyweight 1st, Overall 1st)
- 1989 Nationals (Light Heavyweight, 5th)
- 1990 Junior Nationals (Heavyweight, 2nd)
- 1991 USA Championships (Heavyweight, 2nd)
- 1991 Nationals (Heavyweight, 2nd)
- 1992 USA Championships (Heavyweight & Overall, 1st)

== Professional ==
- 1993 Ironman Pro Invitational (1st)
- 1993 Arnold Schwarzenegger Classic (1st)
- 1993 Mr. Olympia (2nd)
- 1993 Grand Prix France (1st)
- 1993 Grand Prix Germany (1st)
- 1995 Ironman Pro Invitational (1st)
- 1995 Arnold Schwarzenegger Classic (2nd)
- 1995 South Beach Pro (1st)
- 1995 Mr. Olympia (8th)
- 1995 Grand Prix Spain (5th)
- 1996 Ironman Pro Invitational (1st)
- 1996 Arnold Schwarzenegger Classic (2nd)
- 1996 Night of Champions (1st)
- 1996 Canada Pro Classic (2nd)
- 1996 Florida Cup Pro (1st)
- 1996 Mr. Olympia (4th)
- 1997 Ironman Pro (1st)
- 1997 Arnold Schwarzenegger Classic (1st)
- 1997 San Jose Pro Invitational (1st)
- 1998 Ironman Pro Invitational (1st)
- 1998 Arnold Schwarzenegger Classic (1st)
- 1998 Mr. Olympia (2nd)
- 1999 Grand Prix England (2nd)
- 1999 Pro World (2nd)
- 1999 Mr. Olympia (2nd)
- 2000 Mr. Olympia (3rd)
- 2000 Hungarian Grand Prix (1st)
- 2000 Arnold Schwarzenegger Classic (1st)
- 2000 Ironman Pro Invitational (2nd)
- 2002 Mr. Olympia (7th)
- 2003 Ironman Pro Invitational (3rd)
- 2017 Mr. Olympia Classic Physique (15th)

== See also ==
- List of male professional bodybuilders
