= Kevin Levrone =

American bodybuilder (born 1964)

- Professional bodybuilder
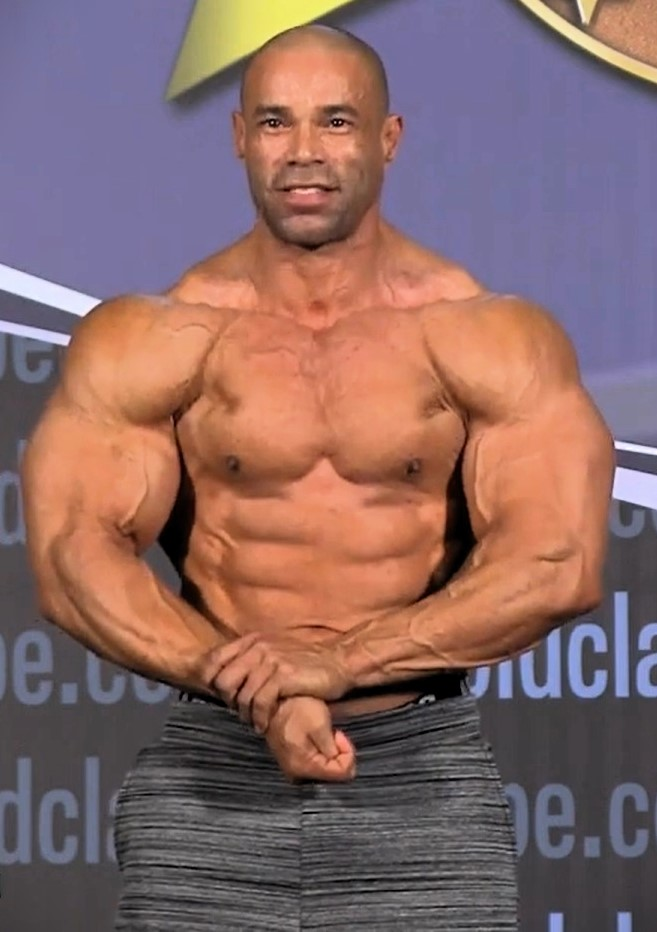
- Levrone at the 2016 Arnold Classic Europe

Personal info
- Nickname: Maryland Muscle Machine
- Born: July 16, 1964 (age 62); Baltimore, Maryland, U.S.

Best statistics
- Height: 5 ft 11 in (1.80 m)
- Weight: Contest: 240–250 lb (109–113 kg); Off season: 265 lb (120 kg)

Professional (Pro) career
- Pro-debut: Junior Nationals; 1991
- Best win: IFBB Arnold Classic; 1994 and 1996

Kevin Levrone (born July 16, 1964) is an American retired IFBB professional bodybuilder. Levrone began his professional IFBB career in 1991 after finishing first in the NPC Finals. He won the Arnold Classic in 1994 and 1996. Levrone is widely regarded as one of the best professional bodybuilders of the 1990s and one of the greatest bodybuilders never to win the Mr Olympia title. Levrone competed in 68 IFBB professional contests, and held the record of the most wins as an IFBB professional until 2001 when Vince Taylor won his 21st pro win.

== Early life ==
Levrone was born on July 16, 1964, in Baltimore, Maryland, to an Italian-American father (originally from Sicily) and African-American mother. He lost both parents to cancer at a young age. Kevin was first inspired to pursue bodybuilding by his cousin. After seeing the size and condition of his cousin, who had returned from serving in the military, Kevin became more serious about working out and bodybuilding in general.

== Training and competition ==
Levrone began his professional IFBB career in 1991 after finishing first in the NPC Finals. After placing 2nd at the 1992 Mr. Olympia contest, for his first participation, he had a severe injury in February 1993. The injury completely tore his major and minor pectorals while bench-pressing 600 pounds, requiring surgery to reattach. He had two surgeries, the first lasting 8 hours. While recovering, he contracted an infection and needed a second surgery. At that time everyone thought that Levrone's career was over, yet he managed to be in contest shape for the 1994 Mr. Olympia only eight weeks later, and placed 3rd. He placed 2nd at Mr. Olympia four times—in 1992 and 1995 behind Dorian Yates (six times winner), in 2000 and 2002 behind Ronnie Coleman (eight times winner). That is the record for most Mr. Olympia seconds without a win.

When he stopped competing in 2003, Levrone did not officially announce his retirement; he explained this as he never thought about retirement, but just decided to do something different and find other challenges.

Despite having been away from competition for well over a decade since 2003, Kevin officially announced in May 2016 that he would return to once again compete at the professional level at the Mr. Olympia contest, by special invite; he indeed entered the 2016 Mr. Olympia contest, at age 51, and placed 17th, with only five months of preparation. In 2018, in the lead up to competing in the Arnold Classic Australia competition, Levrone announced that this would be his last competition; he placed 13th out of a field of 14. Many believe he had improved over his 2016 Mr Olympia condition, but he was still far from the condition that had made him a big name in bodybuilding in the 90s and early 2000s.

Levrone has qualified and participated in 13 Mr. Olympia competitions (including a special invite from IFBB President Jim Manion for the 2016 edition). He's placed 2nd four times, once making his Olympia debut in 1992 to Dorian Yates and in 1995. 2 to Ronnie Coleman (2000, 2002). Due to his popularity and close calls he has been given the title of an uncrowned Mr. Olympia (an honorary title he shares with Kenneth “Flex” Wheeler). Levrone has been applauded for his ability to train quickly for competitions, rather than training year-long. This fact is often attributed to the reason why he was able to come back for the 2016 Mr. Olympia competition. Despite not placing in the top 10 for the first time, Levrone got himself in competition-shape in only 5 months. After the 2016 Mr. Olympia competition Levrone revealed he had trained despite injuries to his pectorals and knee.

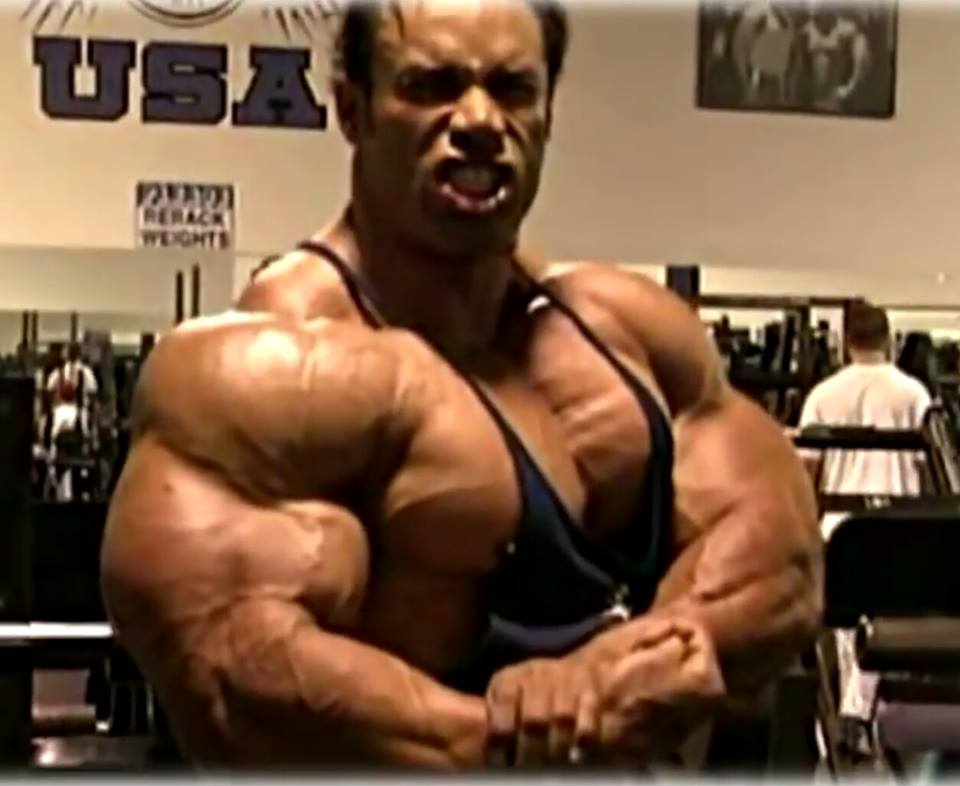
Kevin Levrone

=== Post professional career ===
Since ending his competition career, Levrone enjoys playing other sports like tennis and golf. He has acted in several films and is also a musician. He released an online training platform in early 2016 naming it TeamLevrone.com. In 2015, he released a supplement line called, "Kevin Levrone Signature Series". Also in 2015, he released 4 songs in various streaming platforms.

He is Christian.

== Stats ==
- Height: 5 ft 11 in (1.80 m)
- On Season Weight: 110 kg (240 lb) (post active competitive career)
- Off Season Weight: 120 kg (260 lb) (peak during active competitive career)
- Competition Weight: 110–115 kg (243–254 lb)
- Arm Size: 60 cm (24 in) (active peak)
- Leg Size: 82 cm (32 in)
- Calves Size: 49,53 cm (19.5 in)
- Waist Size: 73.66 cm (29.00 in)
- Chest size: 145 cm (57 in)
- Best Bench Press: 254.5 kg (561 lb)(RAW, i.e. unequipped, with belt and for 4 reps)

== Competitive history ==
- 1991 Junior Nationals – NPC, HeavyWeight, 2nd
- 1991 Nationals – NPC, HeavyWeight, 1st
- 1991 Nationals – NPC, Overall Winner
- 1992 Grand Prix Germany, 1st
- 1992 Grand Prix England, 2nd
- 1992 Chicago Pro Invitational, 3rd
- 1992 Night of Champions, 1st
- 1992 Mr. Olympia, 2nd
- 1993 Grand Prix France, 3rd
- 1993 Grand Prix Finland, 2nd
- 1993 Grand Prix Spain, 3rd
- 1993 Grand Prix Germany, 1st
- 1993 Mr. Olympia, 5th
- 1993 Grand Prix England, 3nd
- 1994 San Jose Pro Invitational, 1st
- 1994 Grand Prix France (2), 1st
- 1994 Grand Prix Italy, 1st
- 1994 Arnold Classic, 1st
- 1994 Mr. Olympia, 3rd
- 1994 Grand Prix Spain, 2nd
- 1994 Grand Prix Germany, 2nd
- 1994 Grand Prix England, 2nd
- 1995 Mr. Olympia, 2nd
- 1995 Grand Prix Spain, 1st
- 1995 Grand Prix Germany, 1st
- 1995 Grand Prix England, 2nd
- 1995 Grand Prix Russia, 1st
- 1996 San Jose Pro Invitational, 1st
- 1996 Arnold Classic, 1st
- 1996 San Francisco Pro Invitational, 1st
- 1996 Mr. Olympia, 3rd
- 1996 Grand Prix Spain, 3rd
- 1996 Grand Prix Germany, 4th
- 1996 Grand Prix England, 4th
- 1996 Grand Prix Czech Republic, 2nd
- 1996 Grand Prix Switzerland, 3rd
- 1996 Grand Prix Russia, 5th
- 1997 Arnold Classic, 8th
- 1997 Mr. Olympia, 4th
- 1997 Grand Prix Hungary, 1st
- 1997 Grand Prix Spain, 1st
- 1997 Grand Prix Germany, 1st
- 1997 Grand Prix England, 1st
- 1997 Grand Prix Czech Republic, 1st
- 1997 Grand Prix Finland, 1st
- 1997 Grand Prix Russia, 2nd
- 1998 San Francisco Pro Invitational, 1st
- 1998 Toronto Pro Invitational, 2nd
- 1998 Night of Champions, 2nd
- 1998 Mr. Olympia, 4th
- 1998 Grand Prix Germany, 2nd
- 1998 Grand Prix Finland, 2nd
- 1999 Arnold Classic, 2nd
- 1999 Mr. Olympia, 4th
- 1999 World Pro Championships, 3rd
- 1999 Grand Prix England, 3rd
- 2000 Arnold Classic, 3rd
- 2000 Mr. Olympia, 2nd
- 2001 Mr. Olympia, 3rd
- 2001 Grand Prix England, 1st
- 2002 Arnold Classic, 5th
- 2002 Grand Prix Australia, 4th
- 2002 Mr. Olympia, 2nd
- 2003 Arnold Classic, 5th
- 2003 Mr. Olympia, 6th
- 2003 Show of Strengths Pro Championship, 3rd
- 2016 Mr. Olympia, 17th
- 2018 Arnold Classic Australia, 13th
