= Vince Taylor (bodybuilder) =

American bodybuilder (born 1956)

Vince Taylor (born August 25, 1956) is a retired American IFBB professional bodybuilder.

== Background ==
Taylor won 22 IFBB titles during his career, a Guinness world record until it was surpassed by eight time Mr. Olympia Ronnie Coleman with 26 wins.

Taylor holds the record for the most Masters Olympia titles with six (1996, 1997, 1998, 1999–2001)

A bodybuilding icon and legend, he made a comeback to the sport at the age of 50 by competing in the 2006 Australian Pro, where he placed 3rd. He then went on to the 2006 Mr. Olympia, placing 11th.

He took 10th place at the 2007 Arnold Classic in a very competitive field. He signed on to compete at the Australian Pro in 2007. Taylor also appeared in several training videotapes, such as "Vince Taylor Workout — "Getting Pumped"" and "Beyond the Masters."

He resides in Pembroke Pines, Florida.

== Physique statistics ==
- Height: 5 ft 9 in
- Off Season Weight: 250 lb
- Competition Weight: 230 lb

== Competition history ==
- 2007 Arnold Classic, 10th
- 2007 Australian Pro, 3rd
- 2006 Mr. Olympia - 11th
- 2006 Australian Pro - 3rd
- 2002 Masters Olympia - 2nd
- 2001 Masters Olympia - 1st
- 2000 Masters Olympia - 1st
- 1999 Masters Olympia - IFBB, 1st
- 1999 Arnold Classic - IFBB, 6th
- 1998 Arnold Classic - IFBB, 3rd
- 1998 Arnold Classic - IFBB, Masters, 1st
- 1998 Masters Arnold - IFBB, Winner
- 1997 Arnold Classic - IFBB, 5th
- 1997 Grand Prix Czech Republic - IFBB, 7th
- 1997 Grand Prix England - IFBB, 7th
- 1997 Grand Prix Finland - IFBB, 6th
- 1997 Grand Prix Germany - IFBB, 9th
- 1997 Grand Prix Hungary - IFBB, 9th
- 1997 Grand Prix Russia - IFBB, 6th
- 1997 Grand Prix Spain - IFBB, 8th
- 1997 Olympia - Masters - IFBB, Overall Winner
- 1997 Mr. Olympia - Masters - IFBB, Masters 40+, 1st
- 1996 Arnold Classic - IFBB, 4th
- 1996 Grand Prix Czech Republic - IFBB, 4th
- 1996 Grand Prix England - IFBB, 6th
- 1996 Grand Prix Germany - IFBB, 6th
- 1996 Grand Prix Russia - IFBB, 3rd
- 1996 Grand Prix Spain - IFBB, 6th
- 1996 Grand Prix Spain - IFBB, 7th
- 1996 Grand Prix Switzerland - IFBB, 5th
- 1996 Mr. Olympia - Masters - IFBB, Winner
- 1996 San Jose Pro Invitational - IFBB, 3rd
- 1995 Grand Prix England - IFBB, Winner
- 1995 Grand Prix France - IFBB, Winner
- 1995 Grand Prix Germany - IFBB, 2nd
- 1995 Grand Prix Germany - IFBB, 6th
- 1995 Grand Prix Russia - IFBB, 2nd
- 1995 Grand Prix Spain - IFBB, 2nd
- 1995 Grand Prix Ukraine - IFBB, Winner
- 1995 Houston Pro Invitational - IFBB, 2nd
- 1995 Niagara Falls Pro Invitational - IFBB, Winner
- 1995 Night of Champions - IFBB, 2nd
- 1995 Mr. Olympia - IFBB, 5th
- 1994 Arnold Classic - IFBB, 2nd
- 1994 Grand Prix France - IFBB, 2nd
- 1994 Grand Prix Germany - IFBB, 2nd
- 1994 Ironman Pro Invitational - IFBB, Winner
- 1993 Arnold Classic - IFBB, 3rd
- 1993 Grand Prix France - IFBB, 2nd
- 1993 Grand Prix Germany - IFBB, 2nd
- 1993 Ironman Pro Invitational - IFBB, 3rd
- 1993 San Jose Pro Invitational - IFBB, Winner
- 1992 Arnold Classic - IFBB, Winner
- 1992 Ironman Pro Invitational - IFBB, Winner
- 1992 Mr. Olympia - IFBB, 6th
- 1992 Pittsburgh Pro Invitational - IFBB, Winner
- 1991 Arnold Classic - IFBB, 3rd
- 1991 Grand Prix Denmark - IFBB, Winner
- 1991 Grand Prix England - IFBB, 2nd
- 1991 Grand Prix Finland - IFBB, Winner
- 1991 Grand Prix Italy - IFBB, Winner
- 1991 Grand Prix Spain - IFBB, Winner
- 1991 Grand Prix Switzerland - IFBB, Winner
- 1991 Ironman Pro Invitational - IFBB, 5th
- 1991 Mr. Olympia - IFBB, 3rd
- 1991 Pittsburgh Pro Invitational - IFBB, Winner
- 1989 Grand Prix England - IFBB, 2nd
- 1989 Grand Prix Finland - IFBB, 2nd
- 1989 Grand Prix Holland - IFBB, 4th
- 1989 Night of Champions - IFBB, Winner
- 1989 Mr. Olympia - IFBB, 3rd
- 1988 Nationals - NPC, Overall Winner
- 1988 Nationals - NPC, Light-HeavyWeight, 1st
- 1987 Mr America - AAU, Medium, 1st
- 1987 Nationals - NPC, Light-HeavyWeight, 4th
- 1983 Mr. Berlin Heavy Weight - 1st

== See also ==
- List of male professional bodybuilders
- List of female professional bodybuilders
