= Dorian Yates =

English bodybuilder (born 1962)

- Professional bodybuilder
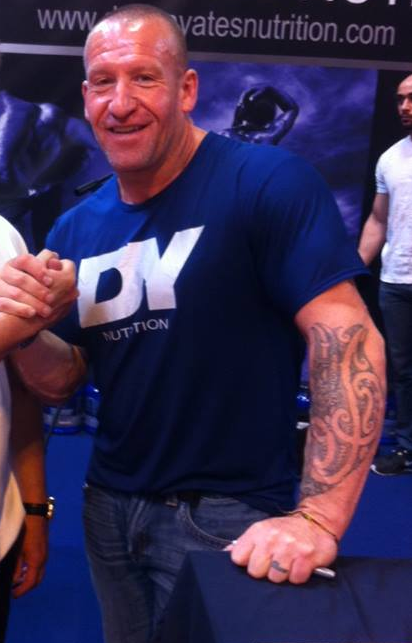
- Yates in 2016

Personal info
- Nickname: The Shadow
- Born: 19 April 1962 (age 64); Solihull, England

Best statistics
- Height: 5 ft 10 in (1.78 m)
- Weight: 255 - 265 lb (115.7 - 120.2 kg)

Professional (Pro) career
- Pro-debut: Night of Champions; 1990
- Best win: Mr. Olympia; 1992–1997
- Predecessor: Lee Haney
- Successor: Ronnie Coleman
- Active: 1984–1997

Dorian Andrew Mientjez Yates (born 19 April 1962) is an English retired professional bodybuilder and a six-time Mr. Olympia champion. He won the title consecutively from 1992 to 1997 and became known by the nickname "The Shadow" for his discreet approach to competition, often appearing at major events without prior public confirmation. Between contests, Yates maintained a low public profile. This also contributed to his distinctive reputation within bodybuilding. Known for his impressive conditioning and wide and thick back, he is regarded as one of the greatest professional bodybuilders of all time. Influenced by the concepts of Mike Mentzer, Yates is credited with popularising high-intensity training (HIT) in the 1990s. He was inducted into the IFBB Hall of Fame in 2003.

== Early life ==
Dorian Andrew Mientjez Yates was born in Solihull on 19 April 1962. He grew up on a farm in nearby Hurley. When he was 13, his father died of a heart attack, after which he moved with his mother and sister to Walmley. He later lived in the Landywood and Castle Vale areas of Birmingham during his early professional bodybuilding years.

== Career ==
Yates started working out properly in 1983 at Martin's Gym in the Temple Row area of Birmingham. During this time, he won the 1984 Mr. Birmingham and became the British Heavyweight Bodybuilding Champion for the first time in 1986. His professional record consists of 15 major contest wins and two second-place finishes, and he won every contest he entered from 1992 until his retirement in 1997. His career ended in large part due to injuries such as torn biceps and triceps, the latter occurring three weeks before his final contest at the 1997 Mr. Olympia, which he nevertheless won. He is one of only four men to retire as a reigning Mr. Olympia.

Peter McGough gave Yates the nickname "The Shadow" for his tendency to unexpectedly appear at major bodybuilding contests and win, having neither confirmed nor denied whether he would compete beforehand, and for staying out of the public eye between contests. He is considered to be the first of the "mass monsters" in bodybuilding; he combined his enormous muscle mass along with peak conditioning, quoted as being "granite hardness". He believes his career-ending injuries were due to his habit of maintaining an extreme level of training intensity all year long, even when approaching contests and while cutting weight. Regarding the use of steroids, he referenced the documentary Super Size Me and cited his belief that eating three McDonald's meals a day would be more harmful than his 12 years of regular steroid use.

Yates was a devoted follower of Arthur Jones and Mike Mentzer's high-intensity training style of weight training, which posits that maximum muscle stimulation can be more efficiently reached through short and extremely intense workout sessions instead of long and steady ones. He said, “If you feel you can attempt a second set, then you couldn't have been pulling out all the stops during the first set." Examples of his biggest lifts include 435 lb underhand barbell rows for 6–8 reps, 425 lb incline bench presses for 6–10 reps, and 595 lb barbell shrugs for 10–12 reps.

== Post-competition career ==
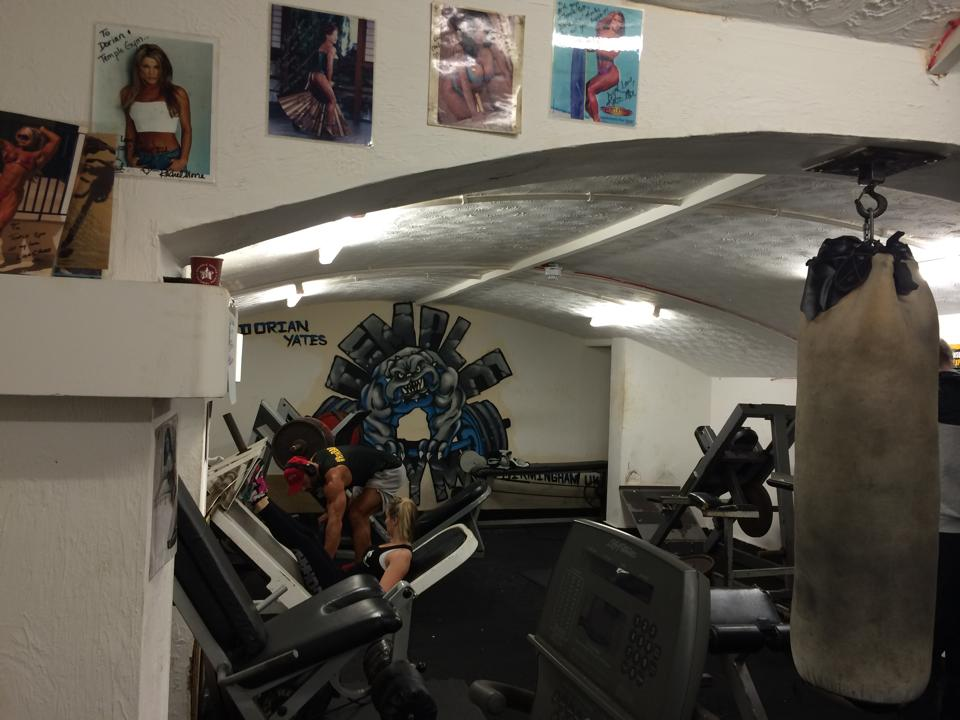
Temple Gym in Birmingham

In 1987, Yates purchased Temple Gym on Temple Street in Birmingham. In 2006, he franchised four additional Temple Gym locations, three of which are in the UK. As of 2020, only the original Birmingham gym is still in operation; it later relocated from Temple Street to the city's Jewellery Quarter.

In 1994, Yates and bodybuilding brothers Mike and Ray Mentzer formed the California-based company Heavy Duty Inc., which marketed athletic apparel and bodybuilding books. In 1998, he partnered with Kerry Kayes to form the bodybuilding supplement company CNP Professional, which marketed a "Dorian Yates Approved" product line in the U.S. He left the company in 2006 to form his own company, Dorian Yates Ultimate Formulas, which offers a line of protein and weight-gain supplements.

Yates started a second company in 2010 called EU Peptides, which sells peptide hormones and other pro-hormone supplements. He left this company in 2012, having founded a third company called DY Nutrition in 2011; it specializes in pre-workout formulas, has released several training DVDs, and offers a line of workout related supplements endorsed by Yates.

== Personal life ==
Yates lives in Marbella with his wife, Brazilian fitness model Glauce "Gal" Ferreira, whom he had met at the 2008 Arnold Classic. His son with his ex-wife Deb is also a bodybuilder and the two work closely together.

Yates practises yoga every day and has described yoga and meditation as life-altering experiences. He has endorsed the use of psychedelics such as ayahuasca for religious and spiritual purposes. He is open about his cannabis use, which predates his bodybuilding career; in a July 2017 appearance on The Joe Rogan Experience, he stated that cannabis has "anti-cancer" properties and said that he is an advocate for its legalisation for this reason in addition to its relaxing properties and temporary increases in respiratory capacity.

Yates revealed his belief in Holocaust denial theories whilst being interviewed by Dave Palumbo in April 2018, claiming that the Holocaust death toll had been "exaggerated" and that two forensic studies (which he did not provide the names of) had concluded that no gas was ever used at the Auschwitz concentration camp.

== Stats ==
- Height: 5 ft 10 in (178 cm)
- Weight: 255–265lbs (115.7–120.2kg)
- Chest size: 56"
- Waist size: 38"
- Calf size: 22"
- Arm size: 20"

== Bodybuilding titles ==
- 1984 Mr Birmingham Novice, 1st
- 1985 World Games, 7th Heavyweights
- 1986 British Championships, 1st Heavyweight
- 1988 British Championships, 1st Heavyweight and overall
- 1990 Night of Champions, 2nd
- 1991 Night of Champions, 1st
- 1991 Mr. Olympia, 2nd
- 1991 English Grand Prix, 1st
- 1992 Mr. Olympia, 1st
- 1992 English Grand Prix, 1st
- 1993 Mr. Olympia, 1st
- 1994 Mr. Olympia, 1st
- 1994 Mr. Worldwide, 1st
- 1994 Spanish Grand Prix, 1st
- 1994 German Grand Prix, 1st
- 1994 English Grand Prix, 1st
- 1995 Mr. Olympia, 1st
- 1996 Mr. Olympia, 1st
- 1996 Spanish Grand Prix, 1st
- 1996 German Grand Prix, 1st
- 1996 English Grand Prix, 1st
- 1997 Mr. Olympia, 1st

Preceded by Lee Haney	Mr. Olympia; 1992–1997	Succeeded by Ronnie Coleman
