= Lee Priest =

Australian bodybuilder (born 1972)

- Professional bodybuilder
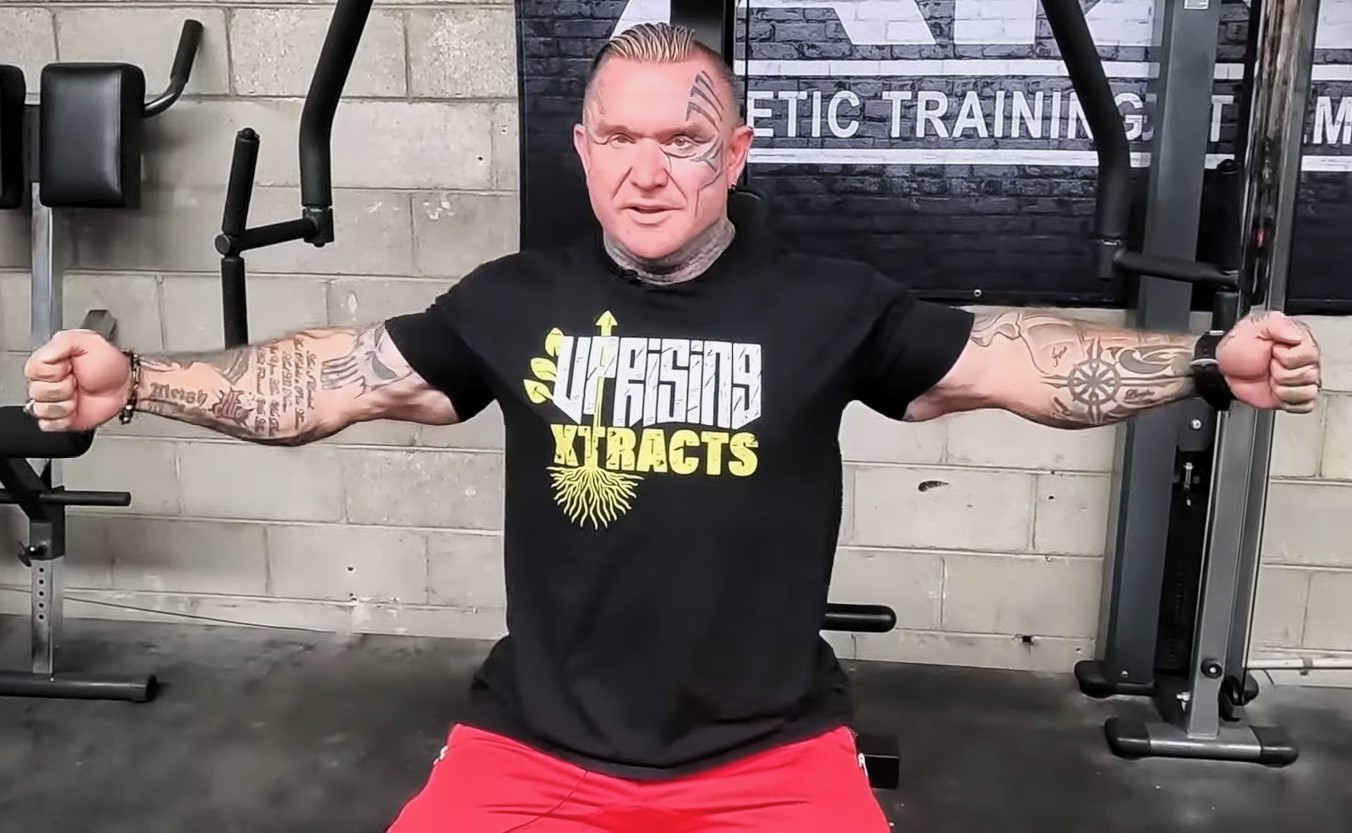
- Priest discussing pectoral flys in 2024

Personal info
- Nickname: The Blond Myth
- Born: 6 July 1972 (age 54); Newcastle, New South Wales

Best statistics
- Height: 162.5 cm (5 ft 4 in)

Professional (Pro) career
- Best win: IFBB Ironman Pro; 2006

Lee Andrew McCutcheon (born 6 July 1972), known professionally as Lee Priest, is a retired Australian IFBB bodybuilder.

== Early life ==
Priest grew up in Wallsend, Australia. An avid Superman fan he started training at the age of 12 with the help and support of his mother (who was also a bodybuilding competitor) and grandfather.

== Career ==
Priest won IFBB Mr. Australia at 16 and competed at the World's Championships at 17, where he placed fourth. At 19 he again won The Mr. Australia title, but was not allowed to get his pro card in Australia because of his young age. Because of this, he moved to California at 20. After Niagara Falls Championships where he placed ninth, Priest was discovered in America and was given his pro card. He became one of the youngest men ever to turn IFBB pro at the age of 20.

Priest then competed regularly at IFBB pro shows. His best placements at the Mr. Olympia were fifth place in 1997, and sixth place in 2000 and 2002. He also emerged fourth at the Arnold Classic in 2002 and 2005. He registered his best win in 2006, winning IFBB Ironman Pro.

Because he competed in the Night of Champions (NOC) and the NOC Britain contests that were promoted by Wayne DeMilia and his Pro Division Inc., in 2006 Priest received a 2-year ban from the IFBB. Following the ban, Priest neglected to renew his IFBB membership due to his lack of interest in continuing to compete.

Following a seven-year absence from competitive bodybuilding, Priest returned in 2013 to compete in the NABBA Mr Universe where he won the overall title as an amateur.

== Post-retirement ==
Upon retirement, Priest joined MuscleSport Magazine in 2014 and began writing a monthly column. He was featured on the cover of their Winter 2015 issue.

In 2015 NABBA and World Fitness Federation hosted Lee Priest Classic Australia 2015 which was held in Sydney. A second Lee Priest Classic event was held in the UK in conjunction with Muscle Promotions UK and sanctioned by WFF International.

Priest starred in the 2018 horror short film Round Trip.

Priest is also an avid racing enthusiast.

== Physical statistics ==
- Height: 162.5 cm (5 ft 4 in)
- Weight: 89–102 kg (196–225 lb) (contest shape) to 113–129 kg (249–284 lb) (during off-season)
- Arms: 20 3/4 in (52.7 cm) (contest shape) to 21 3/4 in (55.2 cm) (during off-season)

== Training videos ==
- The Blonde Myth (1998)
- Another Blonde Myth (2001)
- It's Not Revenge (2006)

== See also ==
- List of male professional bodybuilders
