= Miloš Šarčev =

Serbian bodybuilder

- Professional bodybuilder

Personal info
- Born: January 17, 1964 (age 61); Bečej, SFR Yugoslavia

Best statistics
- Height: 5 ft 8 in (173 cm)
- Weight: 240 lb (109 kg)

Professional (Pro) career
- Best win: Mr. Universe 1989

Miloš Šarčev (Serbian Cyrillic: Милош Шарчев; born January 17, 1964) is an IFBB bodybuilder from Bečej, Serbia.

== Biography ==
Šarčev was Mr. Yugoslavia twice and in 1989 he won the Mr. Universe title. Šarčev nearly died when he struck a vein in one of his triceps while injecting Synthol, a popular site enhancement oil.

He retired from competition in the early 2000s, and has since coached many professional bodybuilders, such as Regan Grimes and Samson Dauda.

== Stats ==
- Height: 5 ft 8 in (173 cm)
- Off Season Weight: 280 pounds (127 kg)
- Competition Weight: 240 pounds (109 kg)
- Upper Arm Size: 21 in (53 cm)
- Chest Size: 55 in (140 cm)
- Thigh Size: 30 in (76 cm)
- Waist Size: 31 in (79 cm)

== Contest history ==
- 1988 AAU Mr. Universe, Light-Heavyweight, 3rd
- 1989 WPF Mr. Universe, Light-Heavyweight, 1st
- 1991 Grand Prix Denmark, 5th
- 1991 Grand Prix England, 9th
- 1991 Grand Prix Finland, 4th
- 1991 Grand Prix Italy, 7th
- 1991 Grand Prix Spain, 7th
- 1991 Grand Prix Switzerland, 6th
- 1991 Niagara Falls Pro Invitational, 4th
- 1991 Night of Champions, 11th
- 1991 Mr. Olympia, 16th
- 1991 San Jose Pro Invitational, 3rd
- 1992 Arnold Classic, 8th
- 1992 Chicago Pro Invitational, 5th
- 1992 Grand Prix England, 8th
- 1992 Grand Prix Germany, 10th
- 1992 Grand Prix Holland, 12th
- 1992 Grand Prix Italy, 10th
- 1992 Ironman Pro Invitational, 6th
- 1992 Niagara Falls Pro Invitational, 4th
- 1992 Night of Champions, 5th
- 1992 Mr. Olympia, 16th
- 1992 Pittsburgh Pro Invitational, 4th
- 1993 Chicago Pro Invitational, 3rd
- 1993 Grand Prix England, 5th
- 1993 Grand Prix Finland, 3rd
- 1993 Grand Prix France (2), 3rd
- 1993 Grand Prix Germany (2), 5th
- 1993 Grand Prix Spain, 4th
- 1993 Niagara Falls Pro Invitational, 3rd
- 1993 Night of Champions, 5th
- 1993 Mr. Olympia, 11th
- 1993 Pittsburgh Pro Invitational, 3rd
- 1994 Grand Prix England, 8th
- 1994 Grand Prix France (2), 6th
- 1994 Grand Prix Germany, 4th
- 1994 Grand Prix Italy, 4th
- 1994 Grand Prix Spain, 4th
- 1994 Mr. Olympia, 13th
- 1995 Canada Pro Cup, 3rd
- 1995 Houston Pro Invitational, 5th
- 1995 Niagara Falls Pro Invitational, 4th
- 1995 Night of Champions, 6th
- 1996 Canada Pro Cup, 3rd
- 1996 Florida Pro Invitational, 3rd
- 1996 Night of Champions, 4th
- 1997 Canada Pro Cup, 1st
- 1997 Grand Prix Czech Republic, 8th
- 1997 Grand Prix England, 8th
- 1997 Grand Prix Finland, 8th
- 1997 Grand Prix Germany, 7th
- 1997 Grand Prix Hungary, 7th
- 1997 Grand Prix Russia, 7th
- 1997 Grand Prix Spain, 9th
- 1997 Night of Champions, 2nd
- 1997 Mr. Olympia, 10th
- 1997 Toronto Pro Invitational, 1st
- 1998 Grand Prix Finland, 5th
- 1998 Grand Prix Germany, 5th
- 1998 Night of Champions, 11th
- 1998 Mr. Olympia, 11th
- 1998 San Francisco Pro Invitational, 5th
- 1998 Toronto Pro Invitational, 7th
- 1999 Arnold Classic, 5th
- 1999 Grand Prix England, 5th
- 1999 Ironman Pro Invitational, 2nd
- 1999 Night of Champions, 5th
- 1999 Mr. Olympia, 10th
- 1999 Toronto Pro Invitational, 2nd
- 1999 World Pro Championships, 5th
- 2001 Night of Champions, 10th
- 2001 Toronto Pro Invitational, 7th
- 2003 Grand Prix Hungary, 6th
- 2003 Night of Champions, 9th

== See also ==
- List of male professional bodybuilders
