= Paul Dillett =

Canadian bodybuilder

- Professional bodybuilder

Personal info
- Nickname: "Freak-einstein" "Jurassic Paul"
- Born: 1965; Montreal, Quebec

Best statistics
- Height: 6 ft 2 in (188 cm)
- Weight: Contest: 290 lb (132 kg); Off-season: 320 lb (145 kg) to 330 lb (150 kg)

Professional (Pro) career
- Pro-debut: Arnold Classic; 1993
- Best win: Night of Champions; 1999
- Active: 1991–2012

Competition record

Men's Bodybuilding

Representing United States

NPC North American Championships
| 2nd | 1991 |
| 1st | 1992 |

Mr. Olympia
| 6th | 1993 |
| 4th | 1994 |
| 5th | 1996 |
| 5th | 1997 |
| 7th | 1999 |

Arnold Classic
| 4th | 1993 |
| 3rd | 1996 |
| 5th | 1996 |
| 6th | 1997 |

Night of Champions
| 1st | 1999 |
| 3rd | 2000 |
| 6th | 2002 |

Ironman Pro Invitational
| 4th | 1993 |
| 2nd | 1996 |
| 5th | 1997 |

Paul Dillett (1965 in Montreal, Quebec) is a retired Canadian IFBB professional bodybuilder and current owner and CEO of the World Beauty Fitness & Fashion Inc. He resides in Toronto, Ontario, Canada.

== Biography ==
Paul Dillett was born in Montreal to a French father and Jamaican mother. Before bodybuilding, Dillett played in the Canadian Football League. Dillett first competed in professional bodybuilding when he took second place in the heavyweight division of the 1991 North American Championships. His first Mr. Olympia was in 1993, where he placed 6th. In 1993, he competed in his first Ironman Pro Invitational, where he took fourth place.

Later that year, he competed in his first Arnold Classic, placing fourth. In 1999, he competed in the Night of Champions competition, where he placed first. Paul has been featured in many fitness and bodybuilding articles, including being featured on the cover of Muscular Development magazine.

At the Arnold Classic in 1994, Dillett "froze" on stage, a result of cramping from dehydration, and four officials had to carry him off the stage. He ended his professional bodybuilding career in 2012. It is conventional wisdom within the industry that while being a genetically gifted athlete of enormous size, Dillett never truly mastered his posing routines, which prevented him from placing higher in contests throughout his career.

Dillett founded the World Beauty Fitness & Fashion Competition (WBFF) in 2007. The competition judges one's overall beauty and marketability. This includes stage presence not just physique. Amateurs and professional contestants, compete in a number of different categories including men's Bodybuilding Pro, Muscle Model, Fitness Model, women's Figure Pro, Diva Fitness Model, and Diva Bikini Model.

== Stats ==
- Height: 6 ft 2 in (188 cm)
- Off Season Weight: 330 pounds (150 kg)
- Competition Weight: 285 pounds (129 kg)

== Contest history ==
- 1991 North American Championships, Heavyweight, 2nd
- 1992 North American Championships, Heavyweight, 1st and Overall
- 1993 Arnold Classic, 4th
- 1993 Ironman Pro Invitational, 4th
- 1993 Mr. Olympia, 6th
- 1994 Grand Prix England, 4th
- 1994 Grand Prix France (2), 2nd
- 1994 Grand Prix France, 1st
- 1994 Grand Prix Germany (2), 1st
- 1994 Grand Prix Germany, 3rd
- 1994 Grand Prix Italy, 2nd
- 1994 Grand Prix Spain, 3rd
- 1994 Mr. Olympia, 4th
- 1996 Arnold Classic, 3rd
- 1996 Grand Prix Czech Republic, 3rd
- 1996 Grand Prix England, 3rd
- 1996 Grand Prix Germany, 4th
- 1996 Grand Prix Russia, 4th
- 1996 Grand Prix Spain, 2nd
- 1996 Grand Prix Switzerland, 2nd
- 1996 Ironman Pro Invitational, 2nd
- 1996 Mr. Olympia, 5th
- 1996 San Jose Pro Invitational, 2nd
- 1997 Arnold Classic, 6th
- 1997 Grand Prix Czech Republic, 6th
- 1997 Grand Prix England, 4th
- 1997 Grand Prix Finland, 5th
- 1997 Grand Prix Germany, 4th
- 1997 Grand Prix Hungary, 4th
- 1997 Grand Prix Russia, 5th
- 1997 Grand Prix Spain, 4th
- 1997 Ironman Pro Invitational, 5th
- 1997 Mr. Olympia, 5th
- 1997 San Jose Pro Invitational, 5th
- 1998 Mr. Olympia, Did not place
- 1999 Night of Champions, 1st
- 1999 Mr. Olympia, 7th
- 2000 Night of Champions, 3rd
- 2002 Night of Champions, 6th
- 2002 Southwest Pro Cup, 8th
- 2003 Grand Prix Hungary, 14th
- 2006 Montreal Pro, 10th

== See also ==
- List of male professional bodybuilders
- List of female professional bodybuilders
