= Ken Waller =

American bodybuilder (born 1942)

- Professional bodybuilder

Personal info
- Born: March 20, 1942 (age 83)

Best statistics
- Height: 6 ft 0 in (1.83 m)
- Weight: 230 lb (104 kg) (1975)

Professional (Pro) career
- Pro-debut: IFBB Mr. America; 1971
- Best win: Mr. Universe 1975
- Active: Retired 1981

Kenny Waller (born March 20, 1942) is an American former bodybuilder featured in the 1977 movie Pumping Iron, which starred Arnold Schwarzenegger. Waller also won the 1975 International Federation of Bodybuilders (IFBB) Mr. Universe contest in Pretoria, South Africa. He was known for his curly red hair, freckles and his graceful, confident posing style.

== Early life ==
Ken Waller was born on March 20, 1942, in San Francisco, California. At the age of 12 his family moved to Jeffersonville, Indiana. He attended Western Kentucky University at Bowling Green (class of 1965), where he was a member of the undefeated 1963 Tangerine Bowl football team. A photograph of Waller still hangs in the WKU football team's locker room. Ken could often be found at the 13th St. Barber Shop near WKU where his buddies, Howard Poindexter, Fred Turner, and Slick Thurman cut hair. He went on to play professional football in Canada, after serving in the United States Marine Corps and teaching high school in Louisville.

== Bodybuilding career ==
Waller, at six feet tall and 230 pounds, was one of the most frequent winning amateur bodybuilders of the 1970s. His most notable win was depicted in the film Pumping Iron, at the Mr. Universe contest of 1975. In a controversial contest, he edged out Roger Walker of Australia, Paul Grant of Wales and his fellow Pumping Iron co-star, Mike Katz, of the US, to take the first place. He went on to compete at the professional level the following year in the 1976 Mr. Olympia contest, where he again defeated Mike Katz to win first place in the heavyweight (over 200 pound) division. He continued to place in the 1977, 1980 and 1981 Mr. Olympias, taking second place in the tall category and fifth overall in 1977. Unlike Frank Zane or lighter competitors, Waller was not known for an aesthetic physique, rather, like fellow competitors, Arnold Schwarzenegger and Lou Ferrigno, he relied on size to gain the attention from judges, which at the time, was only beginning to gain popularity.

== Appearance in Pumping Iron ==
Waller was briefly featured in the photo-essay book of the same name by George Butler and Charles Gaines, but gained much more notoriety from the film documentary of 1977. In it, Waller is portrayed in a somewhat negative light as the antagonist and chief competition of Mike Katz, whose storyline was featured much more prominently in the film. Waller is shown as a devious and cunning character who tries to undermine Mike Katz's concentration by hiding his lucky T-shirt, and discussing his plan to do so with fellow bodybuilders Roger Callard and Robby Robinson in one of the film's most memorable and infamous scenes. In reality, the "T-shirt incident" was staged to add drama to the film, and the scene where Waller confides his scheme was filmed after the Mr. Universe contest actually took place. Waller can actually be seen wearing two different shirts in different camera angles in that scene, making it obvious that it was set up. Waller and Katz were, in fact, friends – as Waller recounted in Raw Iron – The Making of Pumping Iron – but his reputation as a "villain" remained. "I would go to contests and get booed, after that!" said Waller in a later interview.

== Other film appearances ==
Waller had an uncredited, but prominent, cameo in the film Stay Hungry as "Dougie Stewart", the rival of bodybuilder Joe Santo (Arnold Schwarzenegger.) This film was written by Charles Gaines, co-author of Pumping Iron. He also appeared in the B movie Kill The Golden Goose in 1979, "Flex" and in "King of the Beach", an episode of The Incredible Hulk, in 1981.

== Contest placings ==
Year	Competition	Placing
1968	AAU Mr. America	4th
1968	AAU Mr. USA	4th
1969	AAU Junior Mr. USA	1st
1969	AAU Junior Mr. USA	Most Muscular, 1st
1969	AAU Mr. America	3rd
1969	AAU Mr. USA	1st
1969	AAU Mr. USA	Most Muscular, 1st
1970	AAU Junior Mr. America	2nd
1970	AAU Junior Mr. America	Most Muscular, 2nd
1970	AAU Mr. America	2nd
1970	AAU Mr. America	Most Muscular, 2nd
1970	AAU Mr. World	Tall & Overall, 1st
1971	IFBB Mr. America	Tall & Overall, 1st
1971	IFBB Mr. International	Tall, 1st
1971	NABBA Mr. Universe	Tall & Overall, 1st
1971	WBBG Pro Mr. World	2nd
1972	IFBB Mr. International	Tall & Overall, 1st
1972	IFBB Mr. World	Tall & Overall, 1st
1972	IFBB Universe	Tall, 2nd
1973	NABBA World Championships	1st
1974	IFBB Universe	Tall, 2nd
1975	IFBB Universe	Tall & Overall, 1st
1976	1976 Mr. Olympia	Over 200 lbs, 1st
1977	1977 Mr. Olympia	Overall, 5th
1977	1977 Mr. Olympia	Over 200 lbs, 2nd
1979	IFBB Night of Champions	6th
1980	IFBB Grand Prix California	7th
1980	1980 Mr. Olympia	16th
1981	1981 Mr. Olympia	16th

Mr. Olympia
Preceded by Arnold Schwarzenegger; Overall champion	Heavyweight Champion; 1976	Succeeded by Robby Robinson
