= 1981 Mr. Olympia =

Pro bodybuilding competition in Columbus, Ohio, US

The 1981 Mr. Olympia contest was an IFBB professional bodybuilding competition held on October 10, 1981, at the Veterans Memorial Auditorium in Columbus, Ohio. Following the 1980 Mr. Olympia political controversy, a number of favored bodybuilders boycotted the event, including Frank Zane, Mike Mentzer, and Boyer Coe. Franco Columbu, who had not competed since winning the 1976 Olympia due to a career threatening knee injury suffered at the 1977 World's Strongest Man competition, returned and won his second title, officially retiring after the event. Fueling debate and controversy, everyone in the top five received a winning score by at least one of the seven judges.

== Results ==
Total prize money awarded was $50,000.

Place	Prize	Name	Points	Posedown	Total
1	$25,000	(Italy) Franco Columbu	294	2	296
2	$10,000	(United States) Chris Dickerson	289	2	291
3	$6000	(United States) Tom Platz	288	2	290
4	$3000	(Barbados) Roy Callender	286	0	286
5	$2000	(United States) Danny Padilla	281	1	282
6	$1000	(Germany) Jusup Wilkosz	270		
7		(United States) Dennis Tinerino	265		
8		(United Kingdom) Jonny Fuller	264		
9		(Lebanon) Samir Bannout	263		
10		(Australia) Roger Walker	261		
11		(Germany) Hubert Metz	252		
12		(United States) Carlos Rodriguez	249		
13		(United States) Ed Corney	246		
14		(United States) Steve Davis	241		
15		(United States) Mike Katz	237		
16		(United States) Ken Waller	235		
17		(Finland) Jorma Raty	234		
