= 1975 Mr. Olympia =

Professional bodybuilding contest held by IFBB in 1975

The 1975 Mr. Olympia contest was an IFBB professional bodybuilding competition held November 8, 1975 in apartheid-era Pretoria, South Africa. It was the 11th Mr. Olympia competition and the feature event of the 1975 IFBB International Congress.

The event was filmed for the 1977 docudrama Pumping Iron which featured the rivalry between competitors Arnold Schwarzenegger and Lou Ferrigno as they trained for the contest. Although not released until three years after the event, the success of the film made Arnold Schwarzenegger an international celebrity, contributed to his success as Hollywood actor, and helped establish bodybuilding as a professional sport. The final decision between over-200 winner Schwarzenegger and under-200 winner Columbu was very close: 4 judges voted for Schwarzenegger, 3 for Columbu.

== Results ==
The total prize money awarded was $2,500.

=== Over 200lbs ===
Place	Name
1	(Austria) Arnold Schwarzenegger
2	(France) Serge Nubret
3	(United States) Lou Ferrigno

=== Under 200lbs ===
Place	Name
1	(Italy) Franco Columbu
2	(United States) Ed Corney
3	(Barbados) Albert Beckles
4	(United States) Frank Zane
5	(Italy) Giuseppe Deiana

=== Overall winner ===
Place	Name
1	(Austria) Arnold Schwarzenegger

== Notable events ==
- Arnold Schwarzenegger won his sixth consecutive Mr. Olympia title and announced his retirement from professional bodybuilding, although he would later come out of retirement to compete in the 1980 Mr. Olympia
