= 1977 Mr. Olympia =

Bodybuilding competition held in Ohio

The 1977 Mr. Olympia contest was an IFBB professional bodybuilding competition held in October 1, 1977 at Veterans Memorial Auditorium in Columbus, Ohio.

== Results ==
The total prize money awarded was $13,000.

=== Over 200lbs ===
Place	Name
1	(United States) Robby Robinson
2	(United States) Ken Waller
3	(United States) Dennis Tinerino
4	(Australia) Roger Walker

=== Under 200lbs ===
Place	Name
1	(United States) Frank Zane
2	(United States) Ed Corney
3	(United States) Boyer Coe
4	(Barbados) Albert Beckles
5	(United States) Bill Grant

=== Overall winner ===
Place	Name
1	(United States) Frank Zane
2	(United States) Robby Robinson
3	(United States) Ed Corney
4	(United States) Boyer Coe
5	(United States) Ken Waller
6	(United States) Dennis Tinerino

== Notable events ==
- Frank Zane won his first Mr. Olympia title
