= The Hustler of Muscle Beach =

1980 American TV movie

- Genre: Comedy
- Screenplay by: David Smilow
- Story by: Tim Maschler; David Smilow
- Directed by: Jonathan Kaplan
- Starring: Richard Hatch; Kay Lenz; Jeanette Nolan
- Music by: Earle Hagen
- Country of origin: United States
- Original language: English

Production
- Executive producers: John Furia; Barry Oringer
- Producer: Neil T. Maffeo
- Production location: Venice, Los Angeles
- Cinematography: Chuck Arnold
- Editor: LaReine Johnston
- Running time: 100 minutes
- Production company: Furia/Oringer Productions

Original release
- Network: ABC
- Release: May 16, 1980

The Hustler of Muscle Beach is a 1980 American comedy television film starring Richard Hatch, Kay Lenz and Jeanette Nolan. It was directed by Jonathan Kaplan and originally aired on ABC as the ABC Friday Night Movie on May 16, 1980.

== Plot ==
Richard Hatch stars as Nick Demec, a get-rich-quick schemer who stages a bodybuilding competition at Muscle Beach in Venice, California. The film included performances by several professional bodybuilders, including Franco Columbu and Frank Zane, and also co-starred Kay Lenz and Jeanette Nolan.

The film was conceived as a pilot for a television series, but the concept never developed beyond this production.

== Cast ==
- Richard Hatch as Nick Demec
- Kay Lenz as Jenny O'Rourke
- Jeanette Nolan as Rose MacIntosh
- Joe Santos as Barry Layton
- Jack Carter as Mancusco
- Veronica Hamel as Sheila Dodge
- Kenneth McMillan as Joseph Demec
- Bobby Van as Emcee

== See also ==
List of television films produced for American Broadcasting Company
