= Pumping Iron =

1977 docudrama about the world of bodybuilding directed by George Butler

- Official release poster
- Directed by: George Butler; Robert Fiore
- Written by: George Butler; Charles Gaines
- Produced by: George Butler; Jerome Gary
- Starring: Arnold Schwarzenegger; Lou Ferrigno; Mike Katz; Franco Columbu; Ed Corney; Ken Waller; Serge Nubret
- Edited by: Geof Bartz; Larry Silk
- Music by: Michael Small
- Production company: White Mountain Films
- Distributed by: Cinema 5
- Release date: January 18, 1977
- Running time: 85 minutes
- Language: English
- Budget: $400,000
- Box office: $50 million

Pumping Iron is a 1977 American docudrama about the world of professional bodybuilding, with a focus on the 1975 IFBB Mr. Universe and 1975 Mr. Olympia competitions. Directed by George Butler and Robert Fiore and edited by Geof Bartz and Larry Silk, it is inspired by the 1974 book of the same name by photographer Butler and writer/paintball creator Charles Gaines and nominally centers on the competition between Arnold Schwarzenegger and one of his primary competitors for the title of Mr. Olympia, Lou Ferrigno. The film also features segments on bodybuilders Franco Columbu and Mike Katz, in addition to appearances by Ken Waller, Ed Corney, Serge Nubret, and other famous bodybuilders of the era.

Shot during the 100 days leading up to the Mr. Universe and Mr. Olympia competitions and during the competitions themselves, the filmmakers ran out of funds to finish production and it stalled for two years. Ultimately, Schwarzenegger and other bodybuilders featured in the film helped raise funds to complete production, and it was released in 1977. The film became a box office success, making Schwarzenegger a household name. The film also served to popularize the culture of bodybuilding, which was somewhat niche at the time, and helped inspire the fitness craze of the 1980s; following the film's release, there was a marked increase in the number of commercial gyms in the U.S.

The film was released on CED and VHS, and then re-released on DVD in 2003 for the 25th anniversary of the theatrical debut. The film inspired four sequels: George Butler's Pumping Iron II: The Women (1985), a documentary about the world of female bodybuilding; Mark Nalley's Stand Tall (1997), a documentary that features Lou Ferrigno's return to bodybuilding after 19 years; David and Scott McVeigh's Raw Iron (2002), a documentary about the making of Pumping Iron and how the film affected the lives of those who appeared in it; and Vlad Yudin's Generation Iron (2013), a documentary on which Pumping Iron producer Jerome Gary served as executive producer.

== Plot ==
In 1975, bodybuilders are preparing for the upcoming Mr. Universe amateur competition and Mr. Olympia professional competition in apartheid-era Pretoria, South Africa. The first part of the film documents the life of Mike Katz, a hopeful for the title of Mr. Universe. Katz was bullied in his youth for being Jewish and wearing glasses, which spurred him to become a pro football player; when his career with the New York Jets was ended by a leg injury, he became a bodybuilder. His psychological balance is thrown off by a prank by fellow contender Ken Waller, who steals Katz's lucky shirt before the competition. Waller wins Mr. Universe and Katz comes in fourth. Fighting back tears, Katz cheerfully appraises the situation before calling home to check on his wife and children. He then congratulates Waller.

The film then switches focus to the rivalry between Arnold Schwarzenegger and Lou Ferrigno, professional bodybuilders competing for the title of Mr. Olympia. Schwarzenegger, at this point a ten-year veteran of bodybuilding, has won Mr. Olympia for five consecutive years and intends to retire after a final competition. Ferrigno, who at a height of 6 ft 5 in (1.96 m) and 275 lb (125 kg) is the largest bodybuilder to date, is determined to be the man to finally dethrone Schwarzenegger. The film contrasts each man's personality, home environment, and training style: Schwarzenegger is extroverted, aggressive, and works out with other bodybuilders at Gold's Gym and Muscle Beach, whereas the quiet, reserved Ferrigno—who went partially deaf after a childhood ear infection—trains with his father in a dimly lit, private, basement gym. While Ferrigno surrounds himself with his family, Schwarzenegger is accompanied wherever he goes by other bodybuilders, reporters, and beautiful women.

In between interviews and workout demonstrations with Ferrigno and Schwarzenegger, the latter explains the basic concepts behind bodybuilding. Although he emphasizes the importance of physique in bodybuilding, Schwarzenegger also stresses the psychological aspects of competition, crediting his use of psychological warfare for his numerous victories. The film briefly looks at Schwarzenegger's training partner, Franco Columbu, a favorite to win the under-200 lb division at Mr. Olympia. A former boxer from the tiny village of Ollolai, Sardinia, Columbu returns home to celebrate a traditional dinner with his family, who still adhere to old world values and are skeptical of the overt aggression of boxing and bodybuilding. Nevertheless, Columbu impresses his family with a display of strength by lifting up the back end of a car and angling it so it can escape a tight parking spot.

In South Africa, Schwarzenegger wages his psychological warfare on Ferrigno, befriending Ferrigno and then subtly insulting him over breakfast with Ferrigno's family. Schwarzenegger later attends the judging for the under-200 lb class to scope out who his competition will be for the overall Mr. Olympia title, jokingly disparaging Columbu. The appearance of Ed Corney stuns Schwarzenegger, who praises another bodybuilder for the only time in the film, openly admiring Corney's physique and posing prowess. Columbu places first and he moves on to compete against the winner of the over-200 lb category.

Schwarzenegger, Ferrigno, and Serge Nubret prepare to go onstage and compete for the over-200 lb category. In the locker room, Schwarzenegger engages in some last-minute intimidation of Ferrigno, who is visibly shaken onstage and subsequently ends up placing third behind Nubret and Schwarzenegger, who is declared the winner. Schwarzenegger and Columbu engage in a posedown for the title of Mr. Olympia. Schwarzenegger uses his stage presence and intimidating looks to unnerve Columbu, and is declared Mr. Olympia. In a post-victory speech, he announces his official retirement from professional bodybuilding. Later, at an after-party for the competitors, Schwarzenegger celebrates his victory by smoking marijuana and eating fried chicken. With the competition over, he wishes Ferrigno happy birthday and leads the other competitors in singing "Happy Birthday to You" as a cake is revealed. The film ends with Schwarzenegger, Ferrigno, and Ferrigno's parents riding together to the airport, with Schwarzenegger saying he is returning back home to Austria to celebrate with his family.

== Production ==
George Butler asked approximately 3000 people to help finance his bodybuilding documentary, showing them 10 minutes of footage of Schwarzenegger that Butler shot at an amusement park. He eventually raised $400,000. Schwarzenegger was focused on acting and reluctant to compete in another Mr. Olympia, but he said yes after Butler agreed to pay him $50,000. Filming took place over 14 weeks in Los Angeles, San Francisco, Connecticut, Massachusetts, Montreal, Paris, South Africa, and a mountain village in Sardinia (Franco Columbu's childhood home).

The film began as a look at bodybuilding from the perspective of a newcomer to the sport; to this end, the production had hired slim actor Bud Cort, with the intention of following Cort's development from a physically slight man to a muscular, strong bodybuilder. Cort trained at Gold's Gym for a brief period, taking lessons from Schwarzenegger, but ultimately felt that he was wrong for the project; Cort and the producers amicably parted ways, and the documentary team began to focus more intently on the established bodybuilders at Gold's.

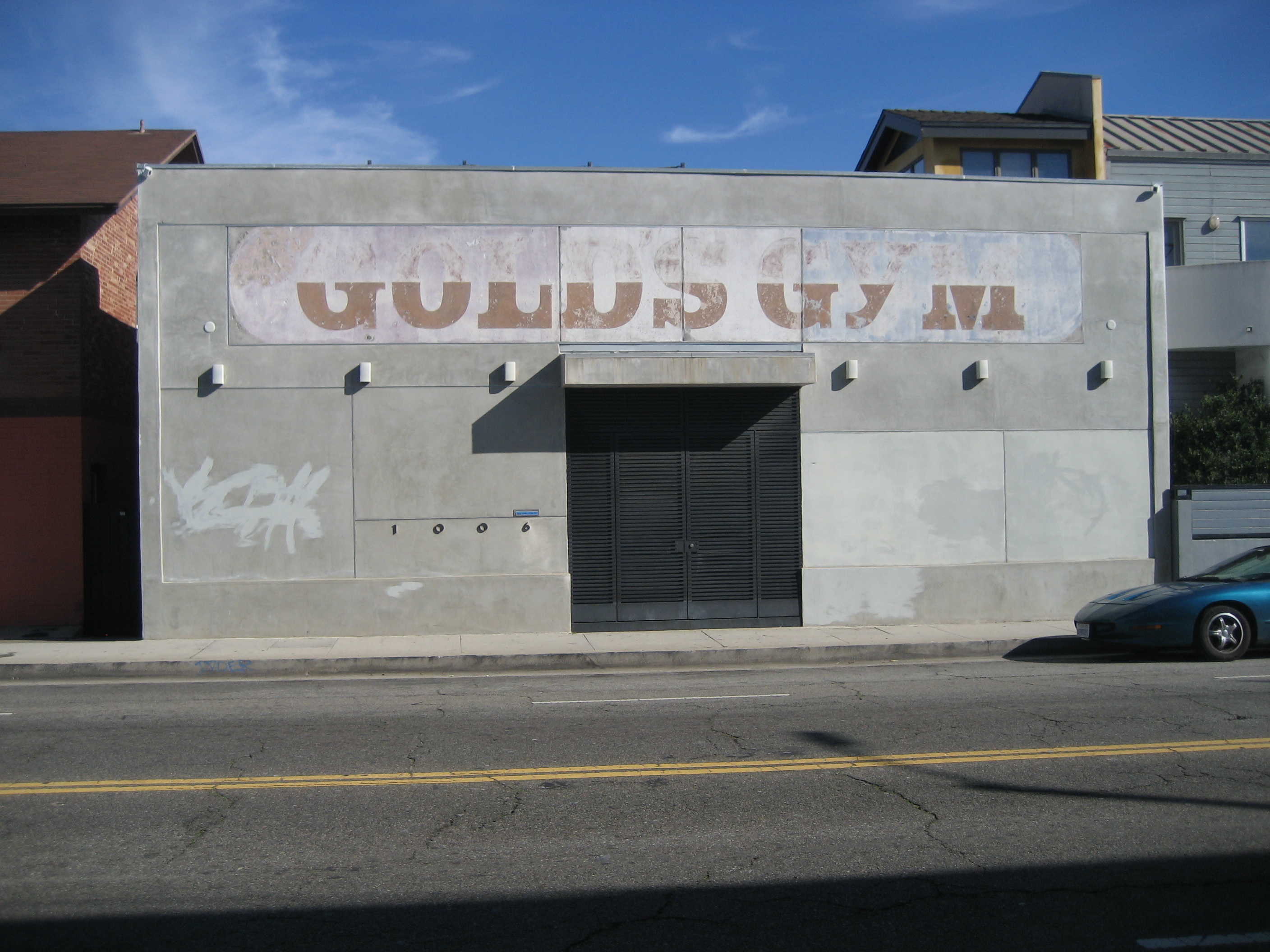
Gold's Gym in Venice, California

In order to compensate for the loss of Cort's narrative arc, Butler decided to capitalize on Schwarzenegger and Ferrigno's contrasting personalities and cast the film as the story of a heroic but "sinister" underdog (Ferrigno) against a charismatic, powerful "villain" (Schwarzenegger). To this end, Butler intentionally avoided filming Ferrigno's training sequences with bright lighting and emphasized the open-air atmosphere of Gold's Gym and the sunlight at Muscle Beach for Schwarzenegger's training sequences. Schwarzenegger claims to have helped Butler in casting himself as a villain, citing his story about not returning home for his father's funeral as having been told to him by a French bodybuilder; however, following the film's release, claims surfaced that Schwarzenegger had in fact refused to attend the funeral. Butler additionally cast the relationship between Mike Katz and Ken Waller as a sinister rivalry, filming the "football scene" where Waller decides to steal Katz's shirt after the fact in order to fill in a narrative gap. Waller and Katz were in fact close friends, and Waller's theft of the shirt was simply a spur-of-the-moment prank not intended to upset Katz to the extent that it did. Waller was later regretful of the football sequence, claiming that audiences at bodybuilding competitions continued to boo him for years after the film's release.

Following the Mr. Olympia contest, the production ran out of money and ended up in development hell for nearly two years. In an effort to raise funds, Butler arranged an exhibit with the Whitney Museum of American Art in New York City: Bodybuilders would become "living sculptures," posing on rotating platforms while art critics analyzed the aesthetics of the bodybuilding physique and compared and contrasted the men to Greek sculpture. To increase interest in the event, Butler arranged for Candice Bergen to be a celebrity commentator; Schwarzenegger also agreed to appear as one of the "living sculptures", having received modest attention for his Golden Globe-winning appearance in the film Stay Hungry. The event proved to be a great success, generating more money than Butler had anticipated and allowing him to complete production on the film.

Upon its release, Pumping Iron became a commercial and critical success. Schwarzenegger's popularity grew beyond that afforded him by Stay Hungry. Ferrigno was shortly thereafter cast as The Incredible Hulk, a role he would continue to play in a variety of mediums into the 2010s. Although bodybuilding had been a subculture regarded by many as being on par with early 20th century freak shows prior to the film's release, the film normalized the idea to the point that interest in bodybuilding began spreading into mainstream American culture. In the years following the film's release, hundreds of commercial gyms began appearing across the United States as demand rose for access to weightlifting equipment.

== Reception ==
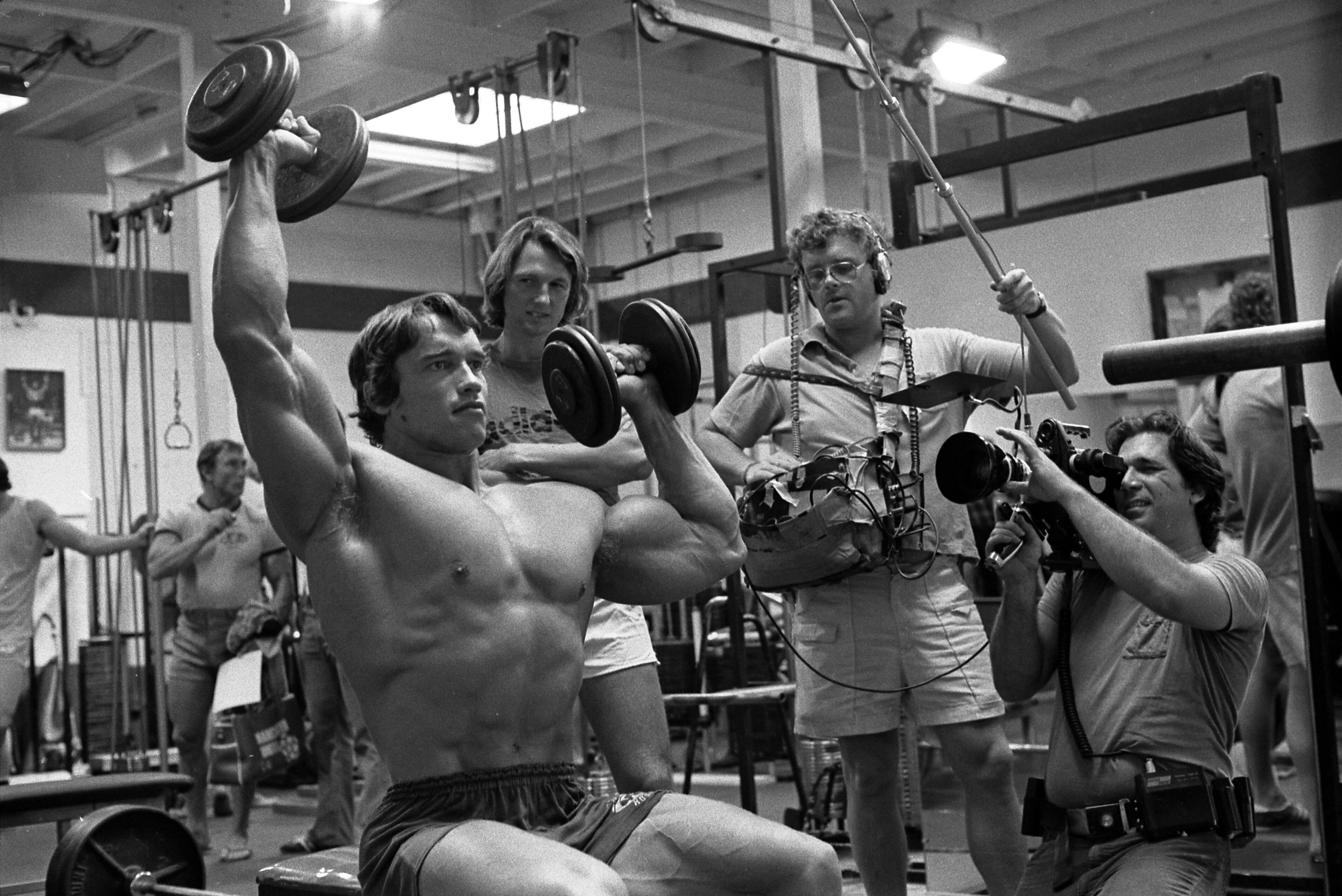
Schwarzenegger being filmed for Pumping Iron

The film received positive reviews from critics. On the review aggregator Rotten Tomatoes, the film has an approval rating of 92%, with an average rating of 7/10. The critical consensus reads, "In addition to offering an enlightening early look into the world of future star/politician Arnold Schwarzenegger, Pumping Iron provides a witty and insightful overview of competitive bodybuilding." On Metacritic the film has a score of 72% based on reviews from 12 critics, indicating "generally favorable reviews".

Richard Eder of The New York Times called the film "an interesting, rather slick and excessively long documentary about the small but intensely competitive world of bodybuilding." Variety wrote, "Technical credits are generally excellent with Fiore's camerawork a major asset. Commercial aspects will depend on the interest in local markets in the sport itself. Certainly, after the first quarter hour of flexing muscles, they all begin to look alike to the non-athletic viewer." Gene Siskel of the Chicago Tribune gave the film three-and-a-half stars out of four and wrote, "The film allows us to get to know two bodybuilders very well, and, as a result, 'Pumping Iron' is much more a story of human beings than it is a freak show. I actually ended up caring who won the contest." He ranked it #9 in his year-end list of the best films of 1977.

Kevin Thomas of the Los Angeles Times wrote, "Directed by Butler and Robert Fiore, who is also the film's very adroit cinematographer, the witty and entertaining 'Pumping Iron' confronts what has been generally considered as a rather exotic subculture with the utmost sophistication. Butler and Fiore regard the bodybuilders with neither compassion nor ridicule but rather a steadfast, cool detachment—even when they themselves are being nakedly manipulative—which makes for a slick, shrewdly calculated, highly amusing and thoroughly enjoyable experience." Gary Arnold of The Washington Post called it "an amusing, buoyant documentary about competitive body building," and observed that "Schwarzenegger is the first personality since Bruce Lee who might become a unique and credible physical star, idolized in particular by kids but enjoyed and admired by a vast cross-section of the public." Louise Sweet of The Monthly Film Bulletin wrote that Schwarzenegger "inspires envy rather than disgust at ostentatious musculature, and lures even the reluctant viewer into his unusual world. Almost all the body-builders here are likable, but Schwarzenegger's articulateness and humour make the film cohere and convince."

== Raw Iron ==
For the film's 25th anniversary, filmmakers David and Scott McVeigh tracked down the participants in Pumping Iron to follow up on their lives and see how the film's success had affected them personally and professionally. The resultant film, Raw Iron, also served to document the making of Pumping Iron, exploring the difficulties that Butler had in producing the film and the narrative choices he made.

Raw Iron also debunked much of the drama in Pumping Iron, such as a cold comment by Schwarzenegger about why he did not attend his father's funeral, and the fact that Matty Ferrigno, Lou's father, had not previously been involved in his son's training and was brought into the production for dramatic purposes. The film originally aired on Starz, and was later featured as an extra on the DVD of Pumping Iron.
