= 1980 Mr. Olympia =

Bodybuilding competition in Sydney, Australia

The 1980 Mr. Olympia contest was an IFBB professional bodybuilding competition held on October 4, 1980, at the Sydney Opera House in Sydney, Australia. For the first time since 1973, there was only a single weight class, with the lightweight division being abolished. This continues to the present day.

The event was one of the most debated competitions in bodybuilding history. While training for his acting role in the 1982 film Conan the Barbarian, Arnold Schwarzenegger stunned the bodybuilding world by unexpectedly coming out of retirement and entering the Mr. Olympia contest one day prior to the event and after having trained for only eight weeks prior. When asked about his decision to enter the competition, Arnold said "we're going to start shooting the first few scenes (of Conan) in October, and so I really wanted to be muscular because the idea was that Conan was a very muscular, heroic looking guy, and that I should be in top shape... the closer I came to this competition more people started speculating on the idea that I would be competing and the more I started thinking about the possibility. And so around 3 weeks or 2 weeks ago I decided, well, I think it would be a kind of an interesting challenge to do something in 8 weeks that most of the guys do, preparing a year or two years in advance."

Frank Zane, the defending three-time Mr. Olympia champion, entered the contest after recovering from a life-threatening injury. Although Zane had completely recovered and had retained his definition, much of his muscular size from the year before was missing. Other favorites at the competition, including Mike Mentzer, Chris Dickerson, and Boyer Coe, were in excellent condition, making the 1980 event one of the most competitive Mr. Olympia contests.

After the final judging, Arnold was declared the winner. The decision was criticized by competitors and attendees, because Arnold lacked his usual size and muscular definition. Many audience members booed as the results were announced. After accepting the runner-up position, Dickerson jumped off stage yelling, "I can't believe it!". Although Coe and Mentzer were tied for fourth in scoring, Mentzer was given the fifth place award. Mentzer was outspoken in his belief that he was the victim of politics and conspiracy. Zane reportedly threw his trophy against the wall backstage, though Zane himself claimed he had dropped it. During his acceptance speech, Arnold acknowledged how close the decision was, saying "I have to be very honest, that this was the highest level of competition that I have ever faced in any competition in my life".

In the aftermath of the competition, many of the competitors, including Zane, Coe, Mentzer, and Walker, vowed to boycott the 1981 contest. CBS Sports attended and filmed the 1980 contest but decided not to air it on broadcast television as planned. It was the last time the Mr. Olympia contest was filmed by an American broadcast television network.

After the event, the intended host, Ken Squier, witnessed Racecam at the Hardie-Ferodo 1000, leading to its being used for the 1981 Daytona 500.

== Results ==
Total prize money awarded was $50,000.

Place	Prize	Name	Points	Posedown	Total
1	$25,000	(Austria) Arnold Schwarzenegger	295	5	300
2		(United States) Chris Dickerson	290	2	292
3		(United States) Frank Zane	291	0	291
4		(United States) Boyer Coe	280	0	280
5		(United States) Mike Mentzer	280	0	280
6		(Australia) Roger Walker	277	0	277
7		(Barbados) Roy Callender	277		277
8		(United States) Dennis Tinerino	276		276
9		(United States) Tom Platz	271		271
10		(United States) Danny Padilla	260		260
11		(United States) Ed Corney	256		256
12		(United Kingdom) Tony Emmott	254		254
13		(United Kingdom) Roy Duval	252		252
14		(United States) Casey Viator	252		252
15		(Lebanon) Samir Bannout	251		251
16		(United States) Ken Waller	249		249

== Notable events ==
- Arnold Schwarzenegger won his seventh Mr. Olympia and officially retired from professional bodybuilding.
- Unlike the 1975-1979 Mr. Olympia contests, which had two weight divisions (above and below 200lbs), this contest had no weight divisions, returning to the 1965-1973 format, in which large and small bodybuilders competed directly against one another.
- The loss and resulting controversy had a major impact on Mike Mentzer personally and professionally; it would be the last time he competed in professional bodybuilding, and he swore until the day he died that the event was rigged.
- According to Chris Dickerson, "the promoter was a real low life, a bigot, who had a real dislike for me—partly on racial grounds and partly for my sexual orientation." Paul Graham even told another official that "Chris couldn't win because he was a fag."
