= Beretta's Island =

Berretta's Island
- Official DVD cover
- Directed by: Michael Preece
- Written by: Franco Columbu
- Produced by: Franco Columbu
- Starring: Franco Columbu
- Cinematography: Massimo Zeri
- Edited by: Sharon Janis
- Music by: Clif Magness
- Production companies: Franco Columbu Productions; Magnolia Productions
- Distributed by: LIVE Home Video
- Release dates: August 23, 1993 (Germany); January 26, 1994 (United States)
- Running time: 95 minutes
- Countries: Italy; United States
- Languages: Italian; English; German

Beretta's Island is a 1993 American direct-to-video action film directed by Michael Preece and produced, written by and starring Franco Columbu.

== Plot ==
A retired Interpol officer tries to bring down the drug lord who killed his friend and threatens an entire village on the island of Sardinia.

== Cast ==
- Franco Columbu as Franco Armando Beretta
- Arnold Schwarzenegger as himself
- Ken Kercheval as Barone
- Elizabeth Kaitan as Linda
- Van Quattro as Johnny Carrera
- Jo Champa as Celeste
- Leslie Ming as Sly
- Audrey Brunner as Tina
- Dimitri Logothetis as Interpol agent
- Buck Holland as Father Pastore

== Production ==
Franco Columbu is a former Mr. Olympia and Arnold Schwarzenegger plays an old weight-training friend.

== See also ==
- List of American films of 1993
