= Carlos Rodriguez (bodybuilder) =

American bodybuilder (1943–1991)

- Professional bodybuilder

Personal info
- Born: 22 April 1943
- Died: 2 January 1991; Tucson, Arizona

Best statistics

Carlos J. Rodriguez (1943–1991) was a bodybuilder and winner of the 1978 Mr. Universe. He also placed in the 1979 and the 1981 Mr. Olympia. In the bodybuilding circuit, he was referred to as the "Pride of the U.S. Marines."

He won a gold medal at the 1979 Pan American Games while representing Puerto Rico. In the late 1980s, he worked to make body building an event in the Olympic Games.

He owned Sportsworld Fitness Center in Tucson, Arizona. He died on January 2, 1991 in Tucson and is buried at Holy Hope Cemetery.

== Biography ==
Rodriguez served in the United States Marine Corps 1961–1966, and set the record for the most push-ups in 2 minutes at 149, and most pull-ups in one minute at 47. He was stationed at Marine Corps Base Camp Lejeune, North Carolina. While serving in the Marines, he scheduled his workouts around his daily duties often using split routines.
