= Franco Columbu =

Italian bodybuilder and actor (1941–2019)

- Professional bodybuilder
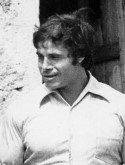
- Columbu, c. 1970s

Personal info
- Nickname: The Sardinian Strongman
- Born: Francesco Maria Columbu; August 7, 1941; Ollolai, Sardinia, Kingdom of Italy
- Died: August 30, 2019 (aged 78); San Teodoro, Sardinia, Italy

Best statistics
- Height: 5 ft 5 in (1.65 m)
- Weight: Contest: 185 lb (84 kg); Off season: 195 lb (88 kg)

Professional (Pro) career
- Best win: IFBB Mr. Olympia; 1976, 1981
- Predecessor: Arnold Schwarzenegger (1975, 1980)
- Successor: Frank Zane (1977); Chris Dickerson (1982)
- Active: Retired after 1981 Mr. Olympia

Francesco Maria Columbu (August 7, 1941 – August 30, 2019) was an Italian and American bodybuilder and actor.

Originally a boxer, Columbu won the Mr. Olympia in 1976 and 1981, and competed in the inaugural edition of the World's Strongest Man in 1977, where he placed fifth. He also had an acting career and authored numerous books on bodybuilding and nutrition. Columbu was inducted into the IFBB Hall of Fame in 2001, International Sports Hall of Fame in 2013 and received the Arnold Classic Lifetime Achievement Award in 2009.

== Early life ==
Columbu was born on August 7, 1941, a son of Maria Grazia Sedda and Antonio Columbu, who were shepherds in Ollolai on the island of Sardinia, Italy. He said in 1982: "I was always skinny. Until I was 11, I got beat up a lot. Then one day, I started beating people up. Nobody could touch me." He worked as a shepherd while training as a boxer. He won over 30 fights as a boxer before quitting the sport in favor of weightlifting and bodybuilding, stating: "Boxing's too rough on your face and head."

Columbu moved to Germany at a young age for work, and met Arnold Schwarzenegger in 1965 at a bodybuilding competition in Stuttgart, Germany. Columbu formed a lifelong friendship with Schwarzenegger, and was Schwarzenegger's best man for his marriage to Maria Shriver in 1986 and godfather to their daughter Christina. Columbu and Schwarzenegger remained very close friends until Columbu's death, with Schwarzenegger stating in 2016, "He was my favourite training partner four decades ago and he is my favourite training partner today."

== Athletic career ==
With Schwarzenegger, Columbu moved to California in the late 1960s to train and work with Joe Weider. Weider provided them with a place to live and an $80 (equivalent to $700 in 2025) per week stipend. The stipend was not enough to live on, so to support their bodybuilding careers, they began a bricklaying company named European Brick Works in 1969.

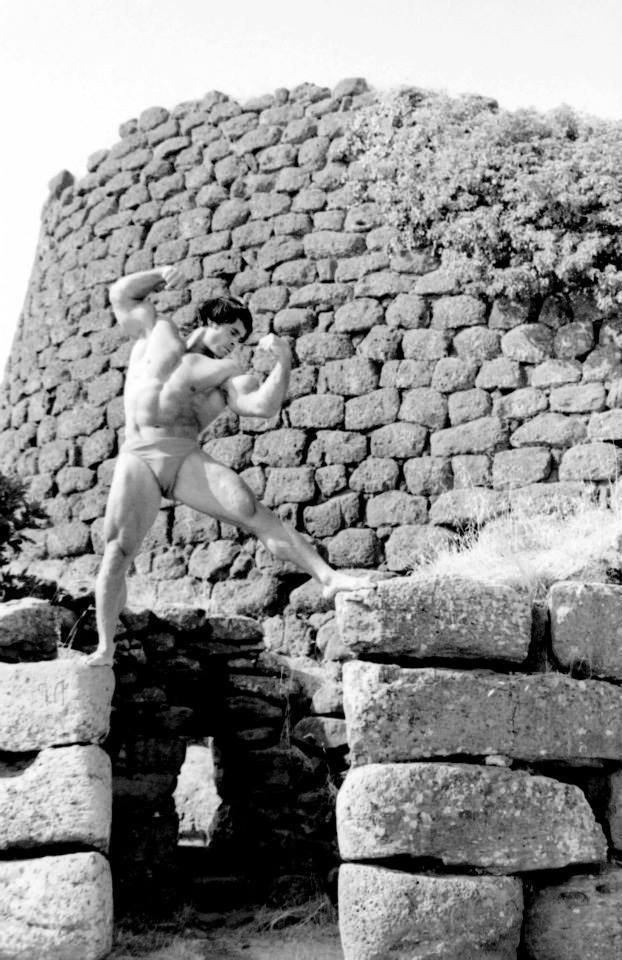
Columbu posing in Sardinia c. 1970s

At 5 ft 5 in (1.65 m) and a competition weight of around 185 pounds (84 kg), Columbu won the IFBB Mr. Europe and Mr. Universe titles in 1970, and the 1971 IFBB Mr. World. He won the lightweight class of the 1974 and 1975 IFBB Mr. Olympias, before winning the overall competition for the first time in 1976.

Columbu participated in the inaugural edition of the World's Strongest Man in 1977. He placed fifth, behind four men who each outweighed him by around 100 pounds (45 kg). During the event, he dislocated his left knee while carrying a refrigerator on his back. The injury kept him out of competition for a few years, and he received a reported $1 million (equivalent to $5.3 million in 2025) in compensation. Columbu returned to win the 1981 Mr. Olympia then retired from competition.

Known for his strength, Columbu's clean and jerk record was 400 pounds (181 kg), his bench press record was 525 pounds (238 kg), his squat record was 655 pounds (297 kg), and his deadlift record was 750 pounds (340 kg). He was named in The Guinness Book of Records in 1978 for bursting a hot water bottle by blowing into it, which he achieved in 55 seconds.

== Film career ==
Columbu appeared as himself in the 1977 bodybuilding docudrama Pumping Iron. He was the bodybuilding coach for Sylvester Stallone in the film Rambo: First Blood Part II (1985), and had roles in films that starred Schwarzenegger, including Conan the Barbarian (1982), The Terminator (1984), and The Running Man (1987). In addition, Columbu's name appears during the opening credits of Schwarzenegger's Last Action Hero as the director of fictional film Jack Slater IV.

Columbu's later films, also as a writer and producer, included the cult film Beretta's Island, (1993), Doublecross on Costa's Island, which he also directed and Ancient Warriors (2003). These three films were almost entirely shot in his homeland of Sardinia. He was also featured, as an actor, in the low-budget production Dreamland - La terra dei sogni.

== Personal life and death ==
Columbu lived in Los Angeles from the 1970s. He was a licensed chiropractor, earning his degree from Cleveland Chiropractic College in 1977. He appeared in television commercials and magazine advertisements for Vitalis "Super Hold" hairspray in 1977. Columbu returned to his hometown of Ollolai in Sardinia every year towards the end of August to attend the local festivities. Columbu became a naturalized citizen of the United States in 1983.

On August 30, 2019, after feeling unwell while swimming off the coast of San Teodoro, Sardinia, Columbu died during transportation by helicopter to a hospital in Olbia, at age 78. A funeral was held in his birthplace, Ollolai, on September 3, 2019. A memorial was held in Los Angeles on October 6, 2019.

== Filmography ==
Year	Title	Role	Notes
1976	Stay Hungry	Franco Orsini	Uncredited
1977	Pumping Iron	Himself	
1980	The Hustler of Muscle Beach	Himself	
1980	The Comeback	Himself	
1982	Conan the Barbarian	Pictish Scout	
1984	The Terminator	Future Terminator	
1984	Getting Physical	Himself	
1986	Don Rickles: Rickles on the Loose	Himself	
1987	Predator	Medic	Uncredited
1987	The Running Man	911 Security Officer #2	
1987	Last Man Standing	Batty	
1988	Big Top Pee-wee	Otto the Strongman	
1990	Perduta	L'americano	
1992	Il ritmo del silenzio	Nerescu	Also executive producer
1993	Beretta's Island	Franco Armando Beretta	Also producer and writer
1994	Taken Alive	Enrico Costa	Also producer and writer
1997	Doublecross on Costa's Island	Enrico Costa	Also director, producer, and writer
1998	Hollywood Salutes Arnold Schwarzenegger: A Cinematheque Tribute	Himself	
2002	Raw Iron: The Making of Pumping Iron	Himself	
2003	Ancient Warriors	Aldo Paccione	Also producer
2008	Why We Train	Himself	
2010	Muscle Beach then and Now	Himself	
2011	Dreamland La Terra dei Sogni	Frank Graziani	
2015	One More Round	Franco Turelli	

== Achievements ==
=== Bodybuilding titles ===
- 1970 IFBB Mr. World (short)
- 1970 IFBB Mr. Universe (short & overall)
- 1971 IFBB Mr. World (short & overall)
- 1974 Mr. Olympia (lightweight)
- 1975 Mr. Olympia (lightweight)
- 1976 Mr. Olympia (lightweight & overall)
- 1981 Mr. Olympia

=== World's Strongest Man ===
- 1977, fifth place

=== Powerlifting records ===
- Bench press, 525 pounds (238 kg)
- Squat, 655 pounds (297 kg)
- Deadlift, 750 pounds (340 kg)

== See also ==
- List of male professional bodybuilders

== Bibliography ==
- Columbu, Franco; Fels, George (1977). Winning Bodybuilding. Contemporary Books. ISBN 978-0809281091.
- Columbu, Franco; Fels, George (1978). Coming On Strong. Contemporary Books. ISBN 978-0809275656.
- Columbu, Franco; Columbu, Anita; Knudson, R. Rozanne (1978). Starbodies: The Women's Weight Training Book. Dutton. ISBN 978-0525475279.
- Columbu, Franco; Tyler, Richard (1979). Winning Weight Lifting and Powerlifting. Contemporary Books. ISBN 978-0809274284.
- Columbu, Franco; Tyler, Richard (1979). Weight Training and Bodybuilding: A Complete Guide for Young Athletes. Wanderer Books. ISBN 978-0671330064.
- Columbu, Franco (1982). Franco Columbu's Complete Book of Bodybuilding. Contemporary Books. ISBN 978-0809259830.
- Columbu, Franco; Fragomeni, Lydia (1983). The Businessman's Minutes-a-Day Guide To Shaping Up. Contemporary Books. ISBN 978-0809255795.
- Columbu, Franco; Fragomeni, Lydia (1985). The Bodybuilder's Nutrition Book. Contemporary Books. ISBN 978-0809254576.

Mr. Olympia
Preceded by Arnold Schwarzenegger	Overall Champion; First (1976)	Succeeded by Frank Zane
Preceded by Arnold Schwarzenegger	Champion; Second (1981)	Succeeded by Chris Dickerson
