= Stay Hungry =

1976 American comedy-drama film directed by Bob Rafelson

- Theatrical release poster
- Directed by: Bob Rafelson
- Written by: Charles Gaines; Bob Rafelson
- Produced by: Harold Schneider; Bob Rafelson
- Starring: Jeff Bridges; Sally Field; Arnold Schwarzenegger
- Cinematography: Victor J. Kemper
- Edited by: John F. Link
- Music by: Byron Berline; Bruce Langhorne
- Distributed by: United Artists
- Release date: April 23, 1976
- Running time: 102 minutes
- Language: English
- Box office: $24.8 million

Stay Hungry is a 1976 American comedy-drama film by director Bob Rafelson from a screenplay by Charles Gaines (adapted from his 1972 novel of the same name).

The story centers on a young scion from Birmingham, Alabama, played by Jeff Bridges, who gets involved in a shady real-estate deal. In order to close the deal, he needs to buy a gym building to complete a multi-parcel lot. He becomes romantically interested in the gym's receptionist (Sally Field) and drawn to the carefree lifestyle of the Austrian bodybuilder Joe Santo (Arnold Schwarzenegger), who is training there for the Mr. Universe competition.

Schwarzenegger won a Golden Globe for Best Acting Debut in a Motion Picture, but it was not his true debut role; he had played Hercules (as Arnold Strong) in the 1970 film Hercules in New York, a gangster's henchman in Robert Altman's 1973 film The Long Goodbye, and a masseur in the 1974 television movie Happy Anniversary and Goodbye.

== Plot ==
Craig Blake is a young Southerner born of a wealthy family, but left lonely and idle after his parents died in a plane crash. He is content to spend his time fishing, hunting, and puttering around his large family mansion in Birmingham, Alabama, inhabited only by himself and a butler. Meeting in hotel banquet hall, Blake is a conspirator in a shady stealth real estate bundling scheme run by slick con artist Jabo. Each conspirator is separately buying real estate which in turn will later bundle together for an office high-rise project. Blake is asked to handle the purchase of a small gym.

He represents himself as a businessman looking to buy the gym and meets its toupee-wearing owner Thor Erikson and employees Franklin and Newton. He is strangely fascinated with the world he discovers there. Blake's usual social life is centered around his upscale country club and its crowd, including his friends Lester and Halsey, and spends his time there playing tennis, shooting poker dice and flirting with women, one of whom asks Blake to find a musical guest for an upcoming party.

As Blake moves forward with the business deal, he is smitten with the receptionist, Mary Tate Farnsworth, and befriends bodybuilder Joe Santo, who aspires to win the Mr. Universe title and lives a life on not wanting to stay comfortable, as doing so would impede the desire to "stay hungry." Blake finds he ultimately cannot sell out his newfound friends at the gym for the sake of his job, so he constantly evades questions about the progress of the gym deal from friend and coworker Hal Foss. Blake's butler, astounded at the sight of Blake's actions around the house, quits his job and plans to send for things bequeathed to him in the will.

Mary Tate and Craig begin a passionate relationship, but trouble erupts when he tries to integrate her into his country-club scene. At a party at the club, which features Santo performing with a country group, Craig's friends mock Santo as a "freak" and an outcast. A fight nearly breaks out between Halsey and Blake but is broken up. Halsey and his friend Packman formulate a plan to embarrass Santo. When he takes the stage, they drunkenly heckle him and the band. Santo tries to ignore it but soon stops playing his violin and leaves the party. Craig tries to convince Mary Tate to see him for who he really is, and not for his snobbish friends and surroundings.

When Jabo realizes that Blake will not purchase the building, he plies Thor and his assistant Newton with drugs, booze, and hookers. The Mr. Universe competition arrives, where Santo is hoping to beat his rival Dougie Stewart. While Thor is drunk and distracted with the prostitutes, Newton secretly stashes the prize money inside his bag and flees. Blake visits the gym and engages in a fight with the drunken and drugged Thor. He finds Mary Tate, who earlier had been assaulted by Thor in an amyl nitrite-fueled rage.

When the Mr. Universe contestants discover that the prize money has been stolen, they run after Santo, who is running to meet Mary Tate. The chase of bodybuilders pours out into the streets of Birmingham and attracts an amazed crowd of onlookers. The bodybuilders engage in an impromptu posing routine for the crowd. Craig sarcastically derides his former bosses at the real-estate firm, going into the gym business with Santo. Craig mocks Jabo with an exaggerated bodybuilding pose and moves out of his family's mansion, leaving his old family memorabilia to his butler, who he has made amends with as he moves along with Mary Tate.

The film ends with a static shot of the Birmingham, Alabama Lyric Theater marquee advertising Al Goldstein and Felicity Split (Melissa Hall) from It Happened in Hollywood (1973), with bodybuilders posing on the fire escapes above.

== Cast ==
- Jeff Bridges as Craig Blake
- Sally Field as Mary Tate Farnsworth
- Arnold Schwarzenegger as Joe Santo
- R. G. Armstrong as Thor Erickson
- Robert Englund as Franklin
- Helena Kallianiotes as Anita
- Roger E. Mosley as Newton
- Woodrow Parfrey as Uncle Albert
- Scatman Crothers as William
- Kathleen Miller as Dorothy Stephens
- Fannie Flagg as Amy
- Joanna Cassidy as Zoe
- Richard Gilliland as Hal
- Mayf Nutter as Richard Packman
- Ed Begley Jr. as Lester
- John David Carson as Halsey
- Joe Spinell as Jabo
- Clifford A. Pellow as Walter Jr. (credited as Cliff Pellow)
- Dennis Fimple as Bubba
- Garry Goodrow as Moe Zwick
- Bart Carpinelli as Laverne
- Bob Westmoreland as Fred Kroop
- Brandy Wilde as Flower
- Laura Hippe as Mae Ruth
- John Gilgreen as Security Officer
- Murray Johnson as Heavy #1
- Dennis Burkley as Heavy #2
- Autry Pinson as Heavy #3
- Martin Hames as The Bartender
- Byron Berline as Fiddler With Mustache
- Susan Bridges as Blonde Photographer at Contest
- Roger Callard as Bodybuilder In Blue Shorts
- Franco Columbu as Franco Orsini
- Ed Corney as Bodybuilder
- Roland LeGrand as Water Skier Single Ski Dock Start
- Mary Leona Perry Kirtley as Water Skier Double Ski Dock Start and Skiing Next to A Tug Boat and Barge
- Janelle Kirtley as Water Ski Trainer For Sally Field
- William Kent Jones as Contestant Judge
- Bob Rafelson as Man On Sidewalk With Painting
- Robbie Robinson as Bodybuilder At Contest
- Ken Waller as Doug Stewart
- Jolene Wolff as Mrs. Clyde

== Production ==
In an interview, Bob Rafelson noted that he had hitchhiked across the South after the making of The King of Marvin Gardens (1972) and had become interested in doing a film in the region. When he decided to not go through with making a film about the slave trade, he was suggested to check out a book by Charles Gaines called Stay Hungry. As he noted:

With Stay Hungry, I wasn’t in the least interested in making this book into a movie, but I was interested in the writer. So I met Gaines in Birmingham, Alabama, and it was only at the end of a very long conversation that I said to him that the conclusions of his novel were not unlike the conclusions I had come to in both Five Easy Pieces and The King of Marvin Gardens. The novel ends on a very exasperated tone with the girl being killed and the character of the hero, Craig Blake, wandering somewhat nomadically, unaffected by the experiences he has gone through.

Rafelson estimated one-third of the characters in the film were not present in the book and also came up with a completely new subplot involving the uncle and William, the family retainer. He then spent six weeks travelling with body-builders to seek out the profession with the Mr. Olympia contest in New York, which convinced him to pursue the film. The film was shot in Birmingham, Alabama and featured several sites, including Joy Young Chinese restaurant, Boutwell Auditorium, the Lyric Theatre, Country Club of Birmingham, and the now former Bank of Savings Building. The film had a note at the credits, stating:

"grateful appreciation to the people of Birmingham, Alabama and to the International Federation of Body Builders

Stay Hungry marked the final collaboration between production designer Toby Carr Rafelson and her then-husband, director Bob Rafelson. After learning that Rafelson pursued women during production, including Sally Field, she filed for divorce and never worked with him again.

Roger Callard, a top bodybuilder of the era, said of his experience making the film: "The director was screaming over his megaphone, 'Please do not touch the bodybuilders!' People were rushing us, even scratching us!"

In her autobiography, Sally Field wrote that during the audition with director Bob Rafelson, she was asked by him to take her shirt off and kiss him; in a 2019 interview, Rafelson denied this.

Inspired by the film, Talking Heads named a song, Stay Hungry, after the film, on More Songs About Buildings and Food.

== Reception ==
=== Critical response ===
For The New York Times, critic Vincent Canby wrote that the film "isn't all bad. It just seems that way when it pretends to be more eccentric than it is and to have more on its mind than it actually does." However, Canby praised the film's depiction of the New South and the performances by Bridges, Field and Schwarzenegger.

Los Angeles Times reviewer Charles Champlin wrote: "It is several movies not quite rolled into one, good performances and good sequences tossed together in the lap of chance, leading to a denouement that would be even cheerier if what went before had engaged belief or concern." Roger Ebert gave the film 3/4 stars saying the film was "as free-form as Nashville".

On Rotten Tomatoes, the film has an approval rating of 69% based on reviews from 16 critics, with an average rating of 6.5/10. On Metacritic, it has a score of 60% based on reviews from 7 critics, indicating "mixed or average" reviews.
