= 1976 Mr. Olympia =

The 1976 Mr. Olympia contest was an IFBB professional bodybuilding competition held in September 18, 1976 at Veterans Memorial Auditorium in Columbus, Ohio.

== Results ==
The total prize money awarded was $5,000.

=== Over 200lbs ===
Place	Name
1	(United States) Ken Waller
2	(United States) Mike Katz

=== Under 200lbs ===
Place	Name
1	(Italy) Franco Columbu
2	(United States) Frank Zane
3	(United States) Ed Corney
4	(United States) Bill Grant
5	(United States) Boyer Coe

=== Overall winner ===
Place	Name
1	(Italy) Franco Columbu

== Highlights ==
- This was the twelfth annual Mr Olympia contest
- Franco Columbu won his first Mr. Olympia title and the fourth title winner since its inception in 1965.
- Franco won the Under-200 division by a single point over Frank Zane.
- After the close, controversial decision, both Columbu and Zane announced their retirements soon afterwards. Neither stayed retired. Zane returned the next year, and won the next three years. Columbu returned in 1981 and won.
- This contest was run by six-time Mr. Olympia Arnold Schwarzenegger and businessman Jim Lorimer. Schwarzenegger had retired in 1975.
