= 1974 Mr. Olympia =

Professional bodybuilding competition

The 1974 Mr. Olympia contest was an IFBB professional bodybuilding competition held on October 12, 1974, at the Felt Forum at Madison Square Garden in New York City, New York. It was the 10th Mr. Olympia competition held.

== Results ==
=== Over 200lbs ===
Place	Name
1	(Austria) Arnold Schwarzenegger
2	(United States) Lou Ferrigno
*

- Serge Nubret (France) was listed as third-place winner. Nubret did not compete in the 1974 contest though.

=== Under 200lbs ===
Place	Name
1	(Italy) Franco Columbu
2	(United States) Frank Zane

=== Overall winner ===
Place	Prize	Name
1	$1,000	(Austria) Arnold Schwarzenegger

== Notable events ==
- Arnold Schwarzenegger won his fifth consecutive Mr. Olympia title.
- This was the first Mr. Olympia to have two weight classes; the two-class scoring system would continue until the 1979 contest.
