= Paul Grant (bodybuilder) =

Welsh bodybuilder (1943–2003)

- Professional bodybuilder

Personal info
- Born: 26 June 1943; Swansea, Wales
- Died: 23 November 2003 (aged 60)

Best statistics
- Height: 1.80 m (5 ft 11 in)

Paul Grant (26 June 1943 – 23 November 2003) was a Welsh bodybuilder who won the "amateur tall" category of the Mr. Universe contest in 1973 and went on to become an ambassador for the sport. Grant also won titles including Mr. Wales, Mr. Britain, Mr. Europe, and Mr. World, and placed 2nd in the World Championships two times. Grant was 5 ft 11 and at his peak weighed 16 stones (224 pounds) with a 50-inch chest and 33-inch waist.

== Early life ==
Grant was born in Swansea on 26 June 1943 (he was a twin). He started lifting weights at the age of 16. He spent his childhood years running cross-country, and at age 16 dropped out of school to start his own business - a bread delivery service. In the evenings, he spent time working out and bulking up. He married Christine (née Mason) in 1967 who went on to become Miss Universe Bikini.

== Bodybuilding career ==
Grant moved near Venice Beach, California in the early 1970s where he trained at Gold's Gym with Arnold Schwarzenegger. Schwarzenegger became Grant's friend and they appeared in the 1976 documentary Pumping Iron together. While in California Grant worked for Joe Weider.

Paul competed in the NABBA Universe competition in 1971, placing 2nd in the tall class 1. He was particularly known for his overall muscularity and superb delts, fantastically cut abs and great thigh sweep.

=== Accomplishments ===
Year	Body	Competition	Division	Placing
1970	NABBA	Mr. Universe	Tall	6th
1971	NABBA	Mr. Britain		2nd
1971		Mr. Europe	Tall	1st & Overall
1971	NABBA	Mr. Universe	Tall	2nd
1971	AAU	Mr. World	Tall	1st
1971	AUU	Mr. World	Overall	2nd
1971	AUU	Mr. World	Most Muscular	2nd
1972	NABBA	Mr. Britain		1st
1972	NABBA	Mr. Universe	Tall	1st
1973	NABBA	Mr. Universe	Tall	1st
1973	WBBG	Pro Mr. World		2nd
1974	IFBB	Universe	Tall	3rd
1975	IFBB	Universe	Tall	3rd
1977	IFBB	European Amateur Championships	Heavyweight	2nd
1977	IFBB	Universe	Heavyweight	3rd
1978	IFBB	USA vs the World	Heavyweight	4th

=== Diet ===
For breakfast he would eat four unsweetened Weetabix moistened with a little milk and washed down by a drink of egg powder concentrate mixed with water. During the day he would eat steak, chicken and peas, with a little non-fat ice cream and four more egg powder drinks. He consumed over 9,000 powdered eggs a year.

=== Retirement ===
Grant moved back to Swansea where he ran a health food store and then a gym. He was president of the Welsh Federation of Body-Builders for 25 years from 1978, in charge of staging the Mr. Wales and Mr. Britain competitions.

== Controversies ==
=== View on steroids ===
Paul had said that he did not take steroids but only because he could put on weight without them. However controversially, he did not disapprove. "All them kids in Biafra are on steroids," he said in an interview in 1973. "Builds them up. Fills them out. Does the good, and that's a fact.”

== Health issues and death ==
Grant developed a kidney disease in his 30s. Because of this, his eyesight was poor and he had to spend three days per week, eight hours a day attached to a dialysis machine. This led to a transplant operation in 1985.

He died at the age of 60 on 23 November 2003.
