= Lou Ferrigno =

American actor and bodybuilder (born 1951)

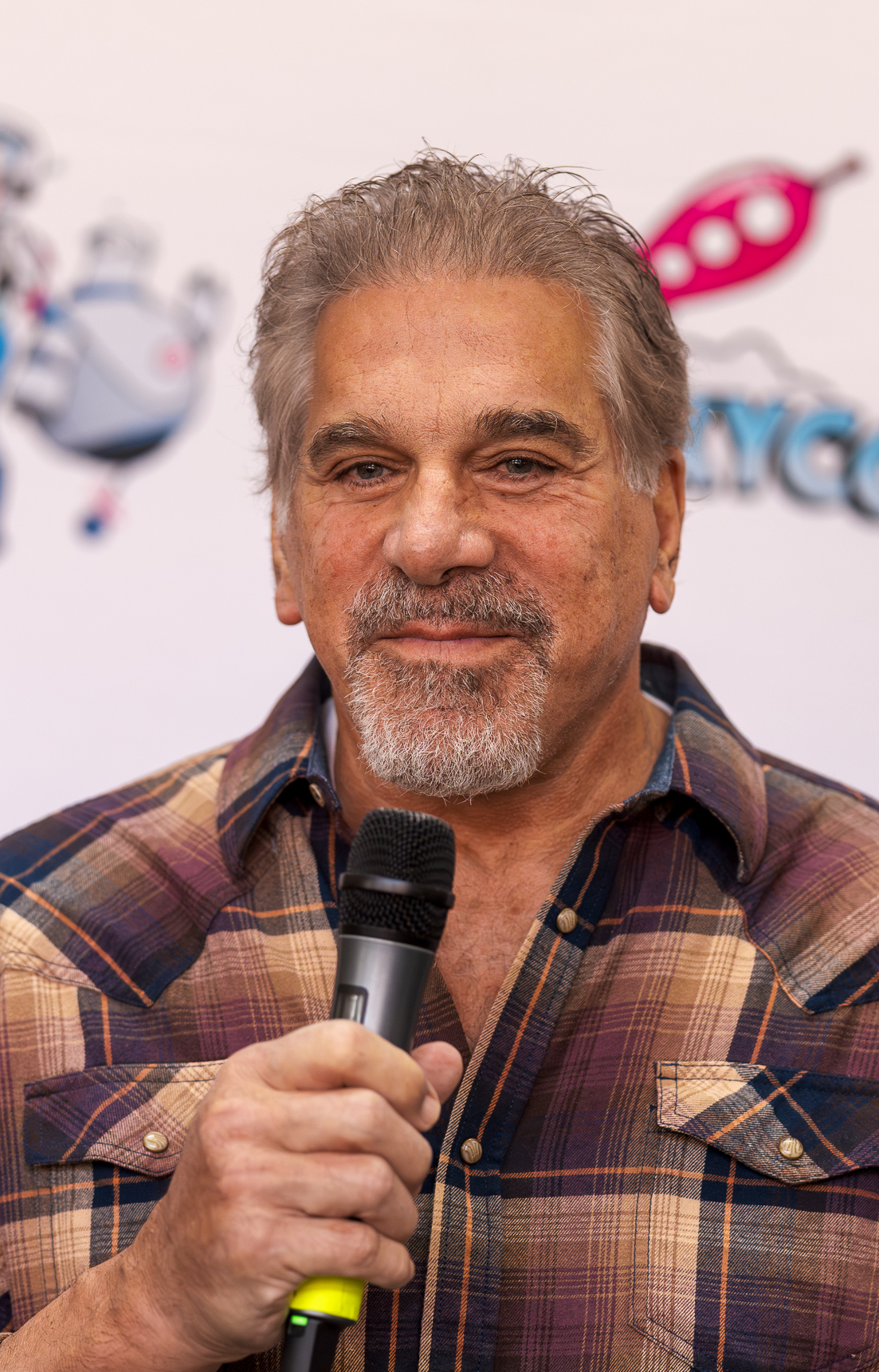
- Ferrigno at GalaxyCon Richmond in 2026
- Born: Louis Jude Ferrigno; November 9, 1951 (age 75); Brooklyn, New York, U.S.
- Occupations: Bodybuilder; actor; personal trainer
- Years active: 1971–present
- Spouses: Susan Groff (m. 1978; div. 1979) Carla Green (m. 1980; died 2026)
- Children: 3, including Lou Jr.
- Professional bodybuilder

Best statistics
- Height: 6 ft 5 in (1.96 m)
- Weight: 315 lb (143 kg)

Professional (Pro) career
- Pro-debut: NABBA Mr. Universe; 1972
- Best win: IFBB Mr. Universe; 1973–1974
- Active: Retired 1996

Louis Jude Ferrigno Sr. (/fəˈrɪɡnoʊ/ fə-RIG-noh, Italian: [ferˈriɲɲo]; born November 9, 1951) is an American actor and retired professional bodybuilder. He won an IFBB Mr. America title and two consecutive IFBB Mr. Universe titles, and appeared in the documentary film Pumping Iron (1977). As an actor, he is best known for his title role in the CBS television series The Incredible Hulk (1977–1982) and vocally reprising the role in subsequent animated and computer-generated incarnations.

He has also appeared in European-produced fantasy-adventures such as Hercules (1983) and Sinbad of the Seven Seas (1989), and as himself in the sitcom The King of Queens and the 2009 comedy I Love You, Man.

== Early life ==
Ferrigno was born in Brooklyn, New York, to Victoria and Matt Ferrigno, a police lieutenant. He is of Italian descent, with his mother hailing from Conca dei Marini and his paternal grandparents from Amalfi and Cava de' Tirreni. Ferrigno says he lost 75% to 80% of his hearing to what he believes were a series of ear infections soon after he was born, though his condition was not diagnosed until he was three years old. Hearing loss and his speech impediment caused Ferrigno to be bullied by peers during his childhood who called him "deaf" and "mute". He began reading comic books such as Hulk and Spider-Man at this time, later saying "I was obsessed with power," and "I wanted to be strong enough so that I could be able to defend myself," which eventually made him take up bodybuilding: "My father rejected me because I was not the perfect son, so I fantasized about being like The Hulk and that’s what led to bodybuilding".

Ferrigno started weight training at the age of 13, citing the bodybuilder and Hercules star Steve Reeves as one of his role models. Because he could not afford to buy weights, he made his own using a broomstick and pails which he partially filled with cement. Ferrigno attended St. Athanasius Grammar School and Brooklyn Technical High School, where he learned metal working.

== Bodybuilding career ==
After graduating from high school in 1969, Ferrigno won his first major title, IFBB Mr. America. Four years later, he won the title IFBB Mr. Universe. Early in his career he lived in Columbus, Ohio, and trained with Arnold Schwarzenegger. In 1974, he came in second on his first attempt at the Mr. Olympia competition. He came in third the following year, and his attempt to beat Schwarzenegger was the subject of the 1977 documentary Pumping Iron. The documentary made Ferrigno famous.

These victories, however, did not provide enough income for him to earn a living. His first paying job was as a $10-an-hour sheet metal worker in a Brooklyn factory, where he worked for three years. He did not enjoy the dangerous work, and left after a friend and co-worker accidentally cut off his own hand.

Following this, Ferrigno left the competition circuit for many years, a period that included a brief stint as a defensive lineman for the Toronto Argonauts in the Canadian Football League. He had never played football, and was cut after two games. Ferrigno left the world of Canadian football after he broke the legs of a fellow player during a scrimmage.

During competition, Ferrigno weighed 275 lb (125 kg) in 1973 and 285 lb (129 kg) in 1976.

Ferrigno competed in the first annual World's Strongest Man competition in 1977, where he finished fourth in a field of eight competitors.

In the early 1990s Ferrigno returned to bodybuilding, competing for the 1992 and 1993 Mr. Olympia titles. Finishing 12th and 10th, respectively, he then turned to the 1994 Masters Olympia, where his attempt to beat Robbie Robinson and Boyer Coe was the subject of the 1996 documentary Stand Tall. After this, he retired from competition.

== Acting career ==
=== 1977–2008 ===
In 1977, Ferrigno was cast as the Hulk in The Incredible Hulk. Though they were rarely on camera together, Ferrigno and Bill Bixby — who played the Hulk's "normal" alter ego — became friends; Ferrigno has described Bixby as a "mentor" and "father figure" who took him under his wing. Ferrigno also singles out the instances in which Bixby directed him in some episodes as particularly memorable. Ferrigno continued playing the Hulk role until 1981, although the last two episodes were not broadcast until May 1982. Later, he and Bixby co-starred in three The Incredible Hulk TV movies.

In November 1978 and again in May 1979 Ferrigno appeared in Battle of the Network Stars. He portrayed the titular character in the 1983 science fantasy adventure film Hercules, and received mixed-to-negative reviews for his performance. He was, however, praised by Marylynn Uricchio, a film critic for the Pittsburgh Post-Gazette, and Andy Brack of Charleston City Paper. Gary Allen Smith, author of the book Epic Films, complimented Ferrigno's physical strength and aesthetics in the film: "At 6' 5" and 286 pounds, he is a massive and thoroughly convincing Hercules". In 2014, Decider named Ferrigno the tenth "hottest onscreen Hercules ever".

In 1983, Ferrigno appeared as John Six in the short-lived medical drama Trauma Center.

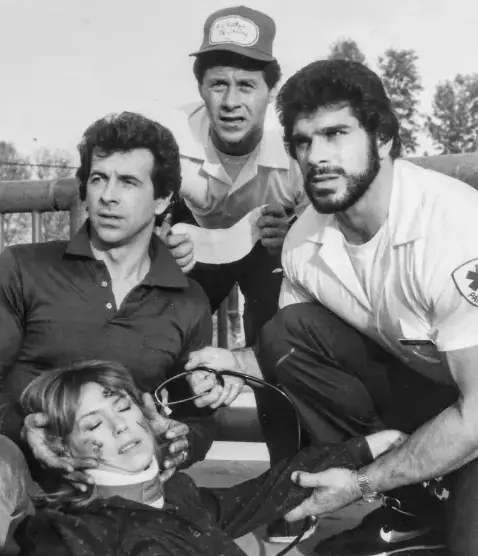
Ferrigno (right) with James Naughton, Alfie Wise and Katia Christine in Trauma Center, 1983

Ferrigno played himself during intermittent guest appearances on the CBS sitcom The King of Queens, beginning in 2000 and continuing until the program's conclusion in 2007. He and his wife Carla were depicted as the main characters' next-door neighbors, enduring their jokes about him being the Hulk.

He made cameo appearances as a security guard in both the 2003 film Hulk and the 2008 film The Incredible Hulk, in which he also voiced the Hulk. In the latter film, Bruce Banner (Edward Norton) bribes him with a pizza to gain entry into a university building. He voiced the Hulk in other Marvel Cinematic Universe films, uncredited. Lou Ferrigno voiced the Hulk until 2015's Avengers: Age of Ultron. Mark Ruffalo has voiced Hulk in subsequent films.

=== 2009–present ===
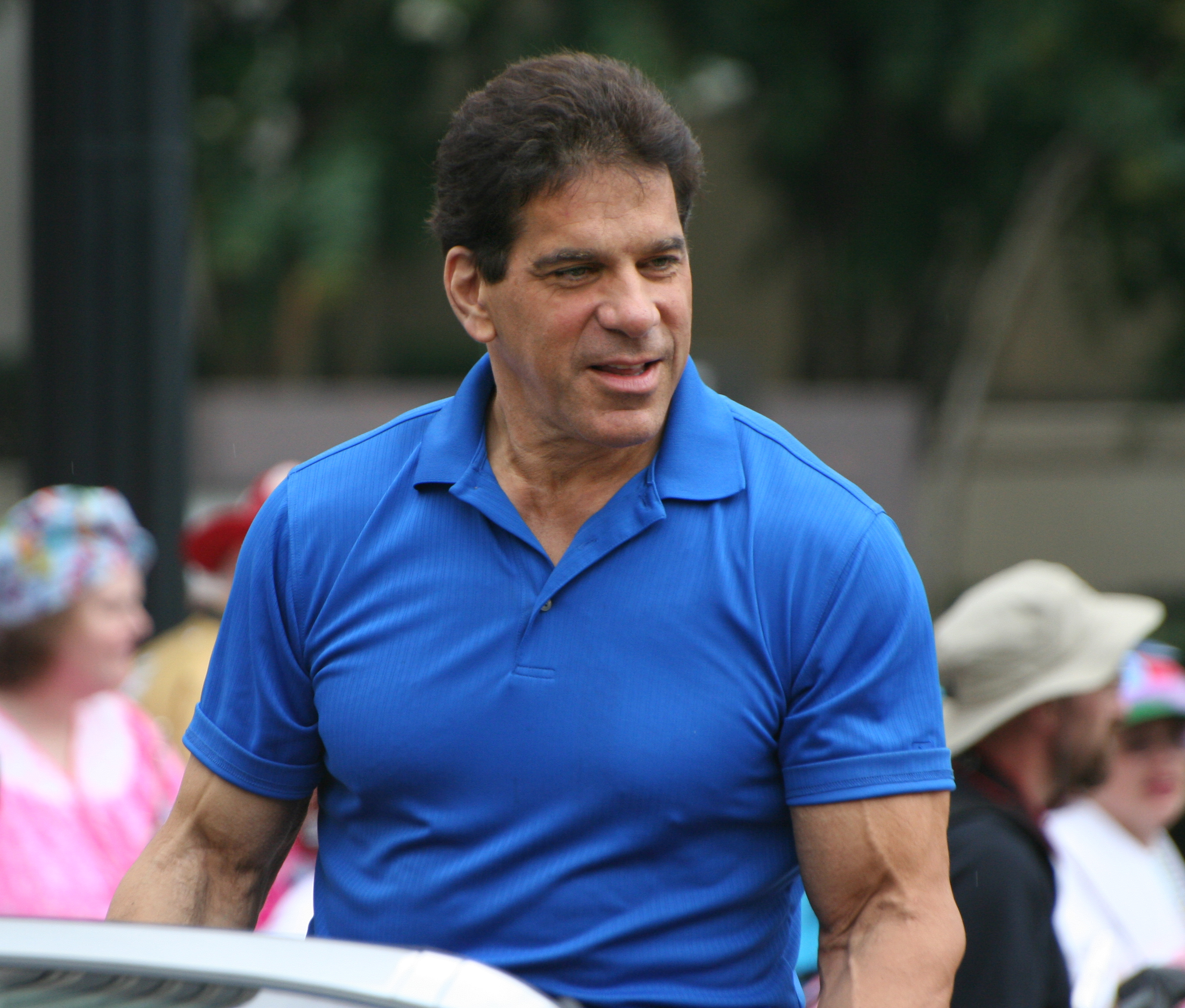
Ferrigno 2009 Dragon Con Parade

He trained Michael Jackson intermittently beginning in the early 1990s, and in 2009, he helped Jackson get into shape for a planned series of concerts in London, which were ultimately cancelled after Jackson's death.

Ferrigno took part in a Smosh sketch, titled "I Love Lou Ferrigno", in which he is tracked down by one of Smosh's members, Anthony Padilla, in Hollywood. The skit ends with Ferrigno knocking Padilla unconscious in response to Ian Hecox's claim that Padilla stole Ferrigno's Butterfinger.

Ferrigno has his own line of fitness equipment called Ferrigno Fitness. In January 2009, he provided equipment to The Price Is Right for use as a One Bid prize and demonstrated the equipment himself.

In 2016, Ferrigno appeared as a playable Lego version of himself in Lego Marvel's Avengers.

== Non-acting endeavors ==
In February 2006, Ferrigno was sworn in as a Los Angeles County, California, reserve sheriff's deputy, Level II. In November 2010, Maricopa County, Arizona sheriff Joe Arpaio swore Ferrigno in as a member of a volunteer sheriff posse, which also included actors Steven Seagal and Peter Lupus, in order to help control illegal immigration in the Phoenix Valley area.

Ferrigno was a contestant on season five of the NBC reality television series The Celebrity Apprentice, which premiered in February 2012. He appeared on the program in order to raise money for his charity, the Muscular Dystrophy Association. Ferrigno was Team Unanimous' project manager for the task depicted in the fifth episode, "I'm Going to Mop the Floor With You," which was to create a viral video to promote O-Cedar's ProMist Spray Mop, placing him in competition with actress Tia Carrere, the project manager of the women's team, Forte. In addition to the usual $20,000 awarded to the charity of the project manager of the winning team, O-Cedar pledged an additional $30,000 for that task. Team Unanimous' video—in which Ferrigno appeared dancing while mopping—won the task, winning the $50,000 for Muscular Dystrophy Association. He was fired in episode nine, "Ad Hawk", which involved creating a 60-second commercial for Entertainment.com.

In June 2012, Ferrigno was sworn in as a reserve deputy to the San Luis Obispo County, California, Sheriff's Department. There he completed his level I law enforcement academy, bringing his training up to full peace officer status. In September 2013, Ferrigno was sworn in as a special deputy to the Delaware County, Ohio, Sheriff's Department.

In 2017, Ferrigno was inducted into the International Sports Hall of Fame.

In May 2018, President Donald Trump appointed Ferrigno to be a member of his Council on Sports, Fitness & Nutrition.

== Personal life ==
Due to ear infections he had soon after birth, Ferrigno lost 75 to 80% of his hearing and has been using hearing aids since the age of five. Ferrigno says his hearing loss helped shape his sense of determination in his youth, saying, "I think that if I wasn't hard of hearing I wouldn't be where I am now. Early on, as a youngster it was difficult, but I'm not ashamed to talk about it because many people have misconceptions about hearing loss; like who has hearing loss and what it's like not to hear, so I do talk about it. I think my hearing loss helped create a determination within me to be all that I can be, and gave me a certain strength of character too. Anytime I do a movie or a TV show, I make them aware of my hearing loss at the beginning, and that makes it much easier for all of us to communicate and get the job done." Later in life, he received a cochlear implant which restored much of his hearing.

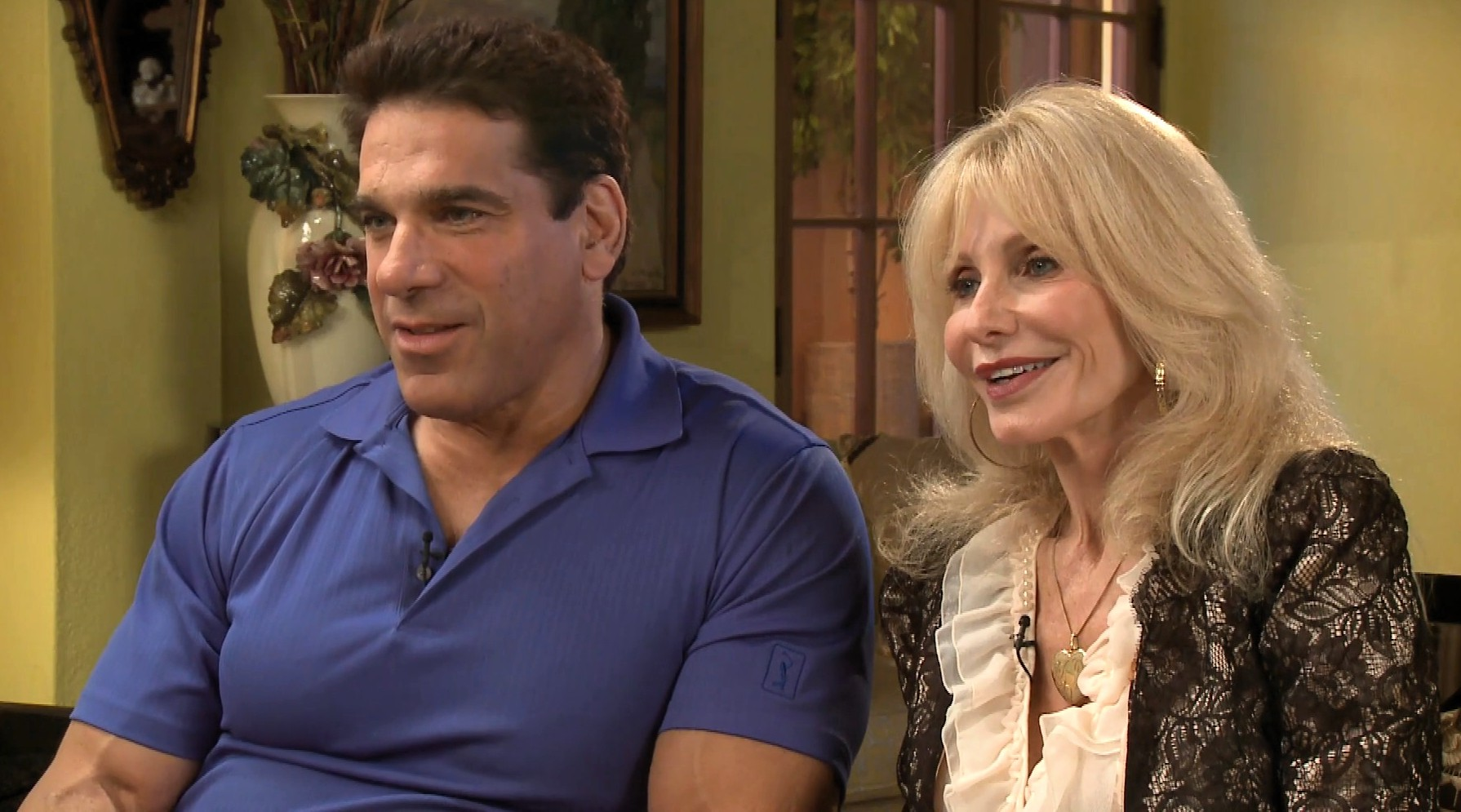
Lou and Carla Ferrigno in 2012

Ferrigno married Susan Groff in 1978, divorcing a year later. On May 3, 1980, he married psychotherapist Carla Green, who then also began serving as his manager; she later became a personal trainer. They have three children: Shanna (born 1981), Louis Jr. (born 1984), and Brent (born 1990). Shanna has a recurring role as Nurse Janice in Days of Our Lives and has also appeared in the NBC series Windfall, the television film Within, and the E! reality television series Filthy Rich: Cattle Drive. Louis Jr. was a linebacker for the University of Southern California Trojans football team and later became an actor, with recurring roles in TV series such as S.W.A.T. and Outer Banks.

Carla died in January 2026.

Ferrigno has filed suit against his younger brother, Andrew, on two occasions over the use of the name Ferrigno in business ventures.

== Competitions ==
- 1971: Pro Mr. America – WBBG, Teen 1st
- 1971: Teen Mr. America – AAU, 4th, Most Muscular 5th
- 1972: Pro Mr. America – WBBG, 2nd
- 1972: NABBA Mr. Universe, Tall 2nd
- 1973: IFBB Mr. America, Overall Winner
- 1973: IFBB Mr. Universe, Tall 1st, Overall Winner
- 1974: IFBB Mr. International
- 1974: IFBB Mr. Universe, Tall 1st, Overall Winner
- 1974 Mr. Olympia, Heavyweight 2nd
- 1975 Mr. Olympia, Heavyweight 3rd place
- 1992 Mr. Olympia, 12th
- 1993 Mr. Olympia, 10th
- 1994: Olympia Masters, 2nd

== Magazine covers ==
- Muscle & Fitness (March 1982, September 1982, March 1983, January 1986, June 1987, July 1988, April 1989, March 1993, March 1994, April 1996)
- Flex (November 1983, August 1985, August 1989, August 1992, October 1992, June 1993, March 1994, November 1994, November 2017)
- Muscle Builder (May 1974, July 1974, April 1977, September 1977, July 1979, March 1980, May 1980)
- Iron Man (July 1973, August 1988, October 1992, November 1994, April 2009)
- Bodybuilding Lifestyle (December 1991, May 1992)
- Muscle Mag International (March 1979, December 1983, November 1994)
- Muscular Development (February 1981, October 1992, April 2009)
- Muscle Training Illustrated (May 1972)
- Natural Bodybuilding (February 1983)
- Strength & Health (November 1983)

== Filmography ==
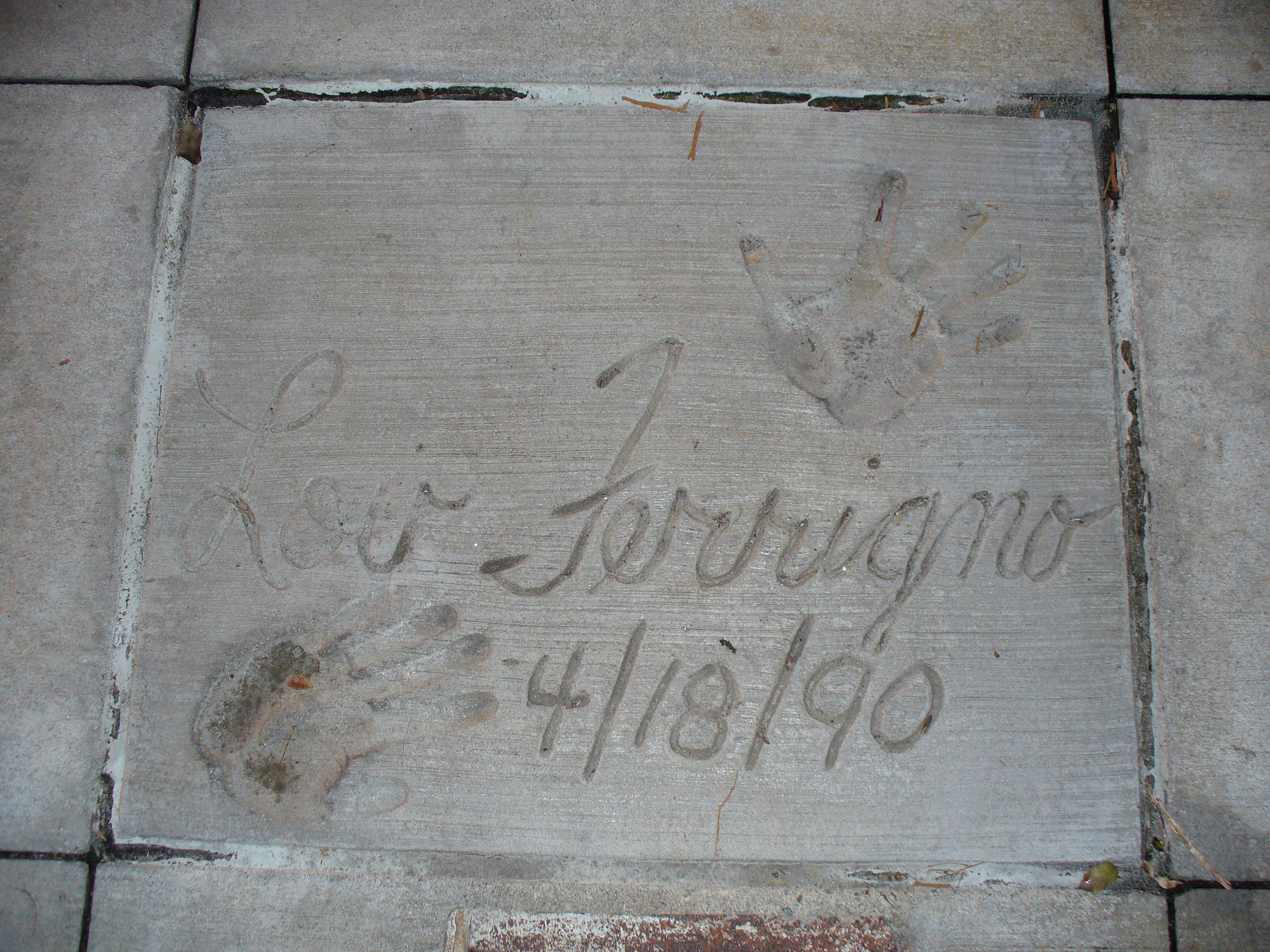
Ferrigno's handprints at Disney's Hollywood Studios theme park

=== Film ===
Film roles
Year	Title	Role	Notes
1977	Pumping Iron	Himself	Docudrama
1983	Hercules	Hercules	
1983	The Seven Magnificent Gladiators	Han	
1985	The Adventures of Hercules	Hercules	
1988	Desert Warrior	Zerak	
1989	Sinbad of the Seven Seas	Sinbad	
1989	Cage	Billy Thomas	
1989	All's Fair	Klaus	
1989	Liberty & Bash	Bash	
1993	And God Spoke	Cain	
1993	Return to Frogtown	Ranger John Jones	
1994	Cage II	Billy Thomas	
1996	Stand Tall	Himself	Docudrama
1998	The Godson	Bugsy	
2003	Hulk	Security Guard	
2008	The Incredible Hulk	Security Guard Hulk	Cameo Voice collaboration
2009	I Love You, Man	Himself	
2012	Liberator	Ed Migliocetti/Liberator	Short film
2012	The Avengers	Hulk	Voice collaboration (voice original and uncredited)
2014	Moms' Night Out	Hulk	Cameo
2015	Avengers: Age of Ultron	Hulk	Voice collaboration (uncredited)
2015	The Scorpion King 4: Quest for Power	Skizurra	Direct-to-video
2015	Avengers Grimm	Iron John	
2017	Instant Death	John Bradley	Lead Role
2017	Thor: Ragnarok	Hulk	Voice collaboration (voice original and uncredited)
2019	Ring Ring	Mr. Daniels	
2020	Guest House	Sergeant Winters	
2025	The Hermit	The Hermit	
2026	Spider-Man: Brand New Day	The Hulk (voice)	(uncredited)

=== Television ===
Television roles
Year	Title	Role	Notes
1977	The Incredible Hulk	Hulk	Pilot movie
1977	World's Strongest Man	Himself / competitor	4th place
1978–82	The Incredible Hulk	Hulk	82 episodes
1979	Billy	Hulk	Cameo
1980	Mister Rogers' Neighborhood	Himself	2 episodes
1983	Trauma Center	John Six	13 episodes
1983	The Fall Guy	John Six	Episode: "Trauma"
1984	Matt Houston	Steve Otto	Episode: "Blood Ties"
1985	Night Court	The Klondike Butcher	Episode: "The Battling Bailiff"
1985	Amazing Stories	Hulk	Episode: "Remote Control Man"; uncredited
1988	The Incredible Hulk Returns	Hulk	Movie
1989	The Trial of the Incredible Hulk	Hulk	Movie
1990	The Death of the Incredible Hulk	Hulk	Movie
1996–1997	The Incredible Hulk	Hulk	Voice role
2000–07	The King of Queens	Himself	20 episodes
2002	Raw Iron: The Making of 'Pumping Iron	Himself	Documentary
2004	My Wife and Kids	Big Guy	Episode "Illegal Smile"
2004	Reno 911!	Deputy Cletus Senior	Episode: "Department Investigation: Part 2"
2010	Chuck	Sofia Stepanova's bodyguard	Episode: "Chuck Versus the Suitcase"
2010	Sonny with a Chance	Himself	Episode: "My Two Chads"
2010–16	Adventure Time	Billy / Bobby	4 episodes
2012	Celebrity Apprentice	Himself	8 episodes (9th fired)
2012	Next Great Baker	Guest judge	Episode: "Cake Powers, Activate!"
2014	Star Trek Continues	Zaminhon	Web series; episode: "Lolani"
2016	We Bare Bears	Paul	Episode: "Yard Sale"
2022	The Offer	Lenny Montana	Miniseries
2026	Impractical Jokers	Himself	Episode: "Haunting of the Joker House"

== Video game ==
Video game credits
Year	Title	Voice role	Ref(s)
2016	Lego Marvel's Avengers	Himself / Hulk (Lou Ferrigno)	

== See also ==
- List of male professional bodybuilders
