= Frank Zane =

American bodybuilder

- Professional bodybuilder
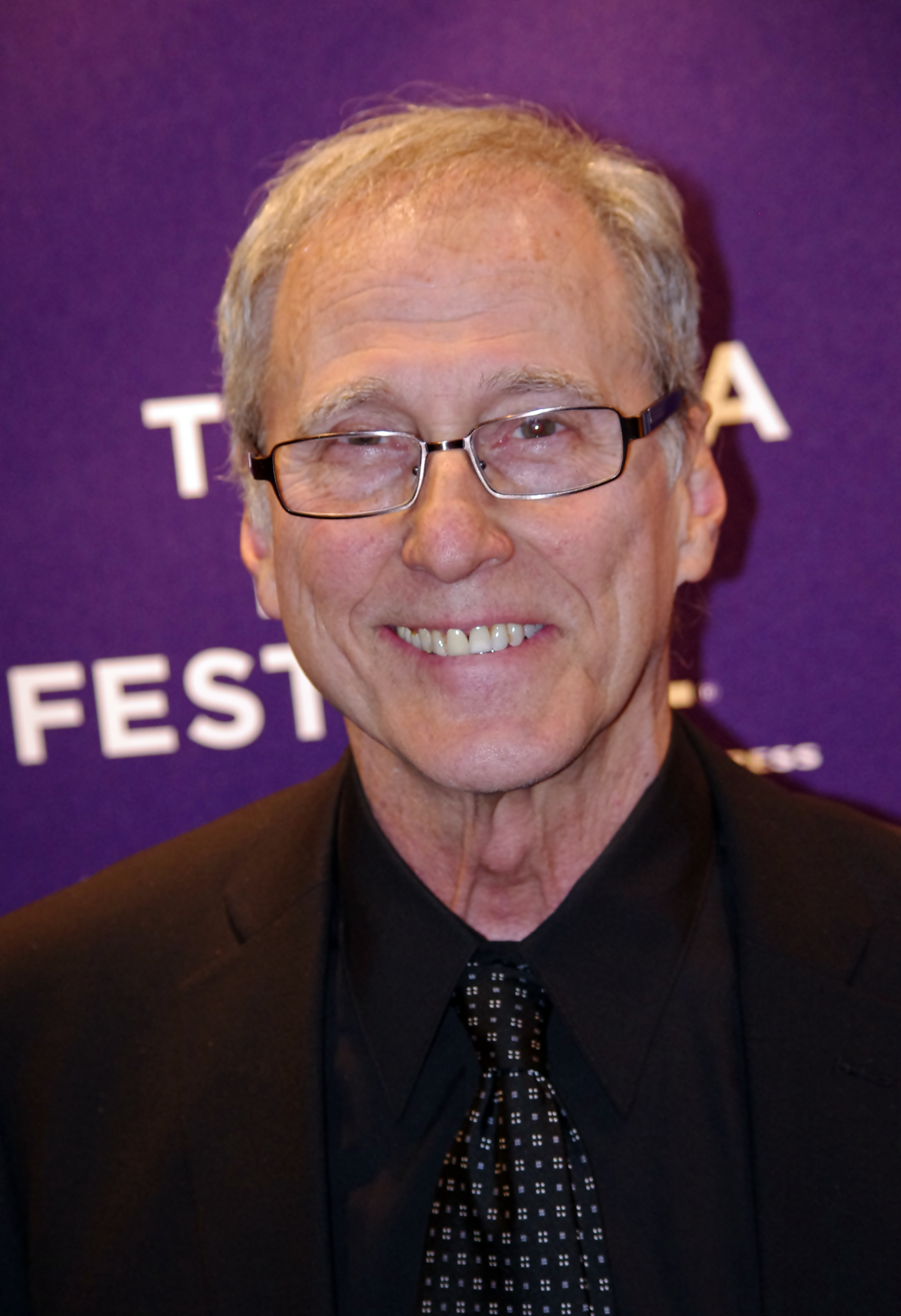
- Zane at the One for All Shorts program at the 2011 Tribeca Film Festival

Personal info
- Nickname: The Chemist
- Born: June 28, 1942 (age 84); Kingston, Pennsylvania, U.S.

Best statistics
- Height: 5 ft 9 in (1.75 m)
- Weight: contest: 200 lb (91 kg); off season: 220 lb (100 kg)

Professional (Pro) career
- Pro-debut: Mr. Pennsylvania; 1961
- Best win: IFBB Mr. Olympia; 1977–1979
- Predecessor: Franco Columbu
- Successor: Arnold Schwarzenegger
- Active: 1961–1983

Frank Zane (born June 28, 1942) is a retired American professional bodybuilder and author. Known as "the Chemist", Zane is a three-time Mr. Olympia winner, having won the competition every year from 1977 to 1979. He previously reigned as Mr. Universe in 1965, 1968, 1970, 1971 and 1972, and Mr. America in 1966, 1967 and 1968. Typically competing at a bodyweight of less than 200lbs, he regularly placed higher than men much bigger than he was. His physique is considered one of the greatest in the history of bodybuilding for his meticulous focus on symmetry and proportion. With one of the smallest, tightest waists in bodybuilding, he was renowned for his vacuum pose.

Since 1971, Zane has authored more than two dozen bodybuilding courses and books, quarterly newsletters, audio tapes, and CDs. In addition he has marketed and sold nutritional supplements since the 1980s. And along with his wife Christine (née Harris), operated a bodybuilding learning center which started in 1985 as Zane Haven in Palm Springs California for more than 20 years, eventually relocating to San Diego under the name Zane Experience program to clients. He was inducted in the IFBB Hall of Fame in 1999.

== Biography ==
Zane was born in Kingston, Pennsylvania on June 28, 1942. He started bodybuilding as a teenager after reading Muscle Magazine. He went from 130 pounds (59 kg) at 14 to 160 pounds (73 kg) at 17 through weightlifting. In 1964, he received a Bachelor of Science from Wilkes University. For 13 years, he taught mathematics and chemistry while living in Florida and California. He also taught mathematics and chemistry at Watchung Hills Regional High School (in New Jersey) for the 1965–1966 school year. He earned a bachelor's degree in psychology from California State University, Los Angeles in 1977. Zane was awarded a master's degree in experimental psychology from California State University, San Bernardino in 1992.

=== Bodybuilding career ===
Zane is a three-time Mr. Olympia (1977 to 1979). His reign represented a shift in emphasis from mass to aesthetics. Zane's physique featured the second-thinnest waistline of all the Mr. Olympias (after Sergio Oliva), with his wide shoulders making for a distinctive V-taper. He stood at 5 feet 9 inches (1.75 m) and had a competition weight of less than 190 pounds (185-190), when he won all three of his Mr. Olympias. He was given the nickname "The Chemist" for his Bachelor of Science degree and, as he puts it: "Back in the day I took a lot of supplements and tons of amino acids. Still do. But back then it was pretty unusual. That's how I got the nickname The Chemist."

He trained with light weights, which saw him to many victories, but Joe Weider urged him to train with heavier weights. Zane then found the size necessary for success at the Olympia. After his three consecutive Mr. Olympia titles came the 1980 Mr. Olympia. Shortly before the competition he had a poolside accident in his home and lost 15 pounds (6.8 kg) of muscle mass. This ended his reign. Arnold Schwarzenegger came out of retirement and won, with Zane in third; the outcome was highly controversial and caused him to boycott the 1981 Mr. Olympia along with Boyer Coe and Mike Mentzer.

Zane is one of only three men to have defeated Schwarzenegger (with Chester Yorton and Sergio Oliva) in a bodybuilding contest and one of the very few Mr. Olympia winners under 200 pounds (91 kg). Overall, he competed for over 20 years (retiring after the 1983 Mr. Olympia) and won Mr. America, Mr. Universe, Mr. World, and Mr. Olympia during his career.

In 1985, Frank and his wife Christine owned and operated "Zane Haven" in Palm Springs, California where they conducted one-on-one sessions with clients. Today, the Zanes live in San Diego, California, and his learning center is called "Zane Experience".

In 1994, Zane was inducted into the Joe Weider Hall of Fame. He received the Arnold Schwarzenegger Lifetime Achievement Award at the 2003 Arnold Classic for his dedication and longtime support of the sport.

In 2005, Zane played the IFBB Announcer and worked as the consulting producer in the movie "See Arnold Run". In 2011, Zane appeared in the documentary Challenging Impossibility describing the weightlifting odyssey of spiritual teacher and peace advocate Sri Chinmoy. The film was an official selection of the 2011 Tribeca Festival.

In June 2020, Frank Zane began filming a feature documentary on his life directed and produced by filmmaker Alex Ardenti.

== Bodybuilding titles ==
- 1961 Mr. Pennsylvania (17th place)
- 1962 Mr. Keystone (Winner)
- 1963 Mr. Keystone (2nd)
- 1965 Mr. Sunshine State (Winner)
- 1965 IFBB Mr. Universe (1st, Medium Height category)
- 1966 IFBB Mr. America (1st, Medium)
- 1967 IFBB Mr. America (1st, Medium)
- 1967 IFBB Mr. Universe (3rd, Tall)
- 1968 IFBB Mr. America (Winner)
- 1968 IFBB Mr. Universe (Winner)
- 1970 NABBA Mr. Universe (Winner)
- 1971 NABBA Pro Mr. Universe (1st, Short)
- 1972 NABBA Pro Mr. Universe (Winner)
- 1972 IFBB Mr. Olympia (Under 200 lbs, 4th)
- 1973 IFBB Mr. Olympia (Under 200 lbs, did not place)
- 1974 IFBB Mr. Olympia (Under 200 lbs, 2nd)
- 1975 IFBB Mr. Olympia (Under 200 lbs, 4th)
- 1976 IFBB Mr. Olympia (Under 200 lbs, 2nd)
- 1977 IFBB Mr. Olympia (Under 200 lbs & Overall Winner)
- 1978 IFBB Mr. Olympia (Under 200 lbs & Overall Winner)
- 1979 IFBB Mr. Olympia (Under 200 lbs & Overall Winner)
- 1980 IFBB Mr. Olympia (3rd, after suffering a near-fatal injury at his home, requiring lengthy hospitalization)
- 1981 IFBB Mr. Olympia – did not compete (boycotted the Mr Olympia contest after the controversial 1980 contest)
- 1982 IFBB Mr. Olympia (2nd)
- 1983 IFBB Mr. Olympia (4th), after suffering another accident on his bicycle, requiring extensive shoulder surgery shortly after the contest)

=== Competitive stats ===
- Height: 5 ft 9 in (175 cm)
- Contest weight: 200 lb (91 kg)

== Bibliography ==
- The Zane Way to a Beautiful Body (1979)
- Super Bodies in 12 Weeks (1982)
- Zane Nutrition (1986)
- Fabulously Fit Forever (1992)
- Fabulously Fit Forever Expanded (1996)
- Frank Zane: Mind, Body, Spirit (1997)
- 91 Day Peak Physique (1997)
- Frank Zane Training Manual (2005)
- The High Def Handbook (2008)
- The Mind in Bodybuilding (2009)
- 91 Day Wonder Body (2016)
- 91 Day Wonder Abs (2017)
- Zane Bodybuilding Manual (2018)
- 31 Day Wonder Posing (2019)
- Muscle Past Midlife | Building The Body (2020)

Mr. Olympia
Preceded by: Franco Columbu	First (1977)	Succeeded by: himself
Preceded by: himself	Second (1978)	Succeeded by: himself
Preceded by: himself	Third (1979)	Succeeded by: Arnold Schwarzenegger
