= Jorma Räty =

Finnish bodybuilder

Jorma Räty (15 October 1946 – 29 September 2007) was a Finnish weightlifter who became a bodybuilder in the early 1960s. He became known as "the best back in the world". In Manila 1980, Jorma won the IFBB Mr. Universe title in the "under 80 kg" class. As of 2007, Jorma Räty is the only Nordic male bodybuilder to have won the IFBB Mr. Universe title. His country-fellow, Finnish-Estonian bodybuilder, Olev Annus, won the NABBA Mr. Universe -title in 1987.
