= Paul Graham (bodybuilder) =

Australian wrestler and bodybuilder

Paul Graham was an Australian professional wrestler bodybuilder and president of the Australian IFBB bodybuilding federation.

Arnold Schwarzenegger was best man at Paul Graham's wedding.

Graham died on 11 May 2026.
