= 1977 World's Strongest Man =

Strongman competition in 1977

Competition information
- Dates: 1977
- Venue: Universal Studios
- Location: Los Angeles, California
- Country: United States
- Athletes participating: 8
- Nations participating: 2

Champion(s)
- (United States) Bruce Wilhelm

The 1977 World's Strongest Man was the 1st edition of World's Strongest Man and was held at the Universal Studios, California and took place over ten weeks. The title was won by Bruce Wilhelm from the United States. It was his first title. Bob Young from the United States finished second, and Ken Patera also from the United States third.

== Background ==
Originally commissioned by Trans World International for CBS, the concept for the World's Strongest Man event came from Scots David P. Webster and Douglas Edmunds. Webster had earned himself a name as an event organiser through his involvement with the Highland games, while Edmunds had experience in professional shot put, discus, and caber tossing. The event was mostly developed for entertainment purposes.

With no precedent for a worldwide 'Strongman' competition, the concept of a strongman competitor and event was new, and as such, the competitors came from a wide range of existing disciplines, including American football, powerlifting and track and field. This meant that none of the competitors had ever trained for the events taking place during the competition.

In addition, several of the events in which the athletes competed were poorly thought out or dangerous, as evidenced when Italian Franco Columbu fell during the penultimate event, the Fridge Race, dislocating his knee, forcing him to retire and putting him out of action for three years. The fridge carry was not reintroduced to the competition until 2004, with a crossbar added to stabilise two fridges on either side of the athlete.

== Qualification ==
Qualification to the event was by invite only 'on the recommendation of experts.'

== Line-Up ==
Name	Nationality	Age	Profession	Notable Accolades
Jon Cole	USA	34	Weightlifter	AAU US National Powerlifting Champion: 1968, 1970, 1972
Franco Columbu	Italy	34	Bodybuilder	Mr. Olympia: 1976 IFBB Mr. World: 1971 IFBB Mr. Universe: 1971 IFBB Mr. Europe: 1971
Mike Dayton	USA	29	Stuntman Kung Fu Artist	Teen Mr. America: 1967 Kung Fu Master of Chi: 1976
Lou Ferrigno	USA	26	Bodybuilder Actor	IFBB Mr. Universe: 1973, 1974 IFBB Mr. America: 1973 Starred as The Incredible Hulk in the TV series.
George Frenn	USA	36	Hammer Thrower	1971 Pan American Games, Hammer Throw: Silver 1967 Pan American Games, Hammer Throw: Bronze
Ken Patera	USA	34	Weightlifter Wrestler	1971 Pan American Games, Weightlifting: Gold 1971 World Weightlifting Champions: Silver
Bruce Wilhelm	USA	31	Weightlifter	AAU US Super Heavyweight Weightlifting Champion: 1975, 1976 1975 Pan American Games, Weightlifting: Silver
Bob Young	USA	35	American Footballer	None at the time of the competition.

== Results ==
#	Name	Nationality	TOTAL
1	Bruce Wilhelm	United States	63.25
2	Bob Young	United States	43.25
3	Ken Patera	United States	34
4	Lou Ferrigno	United States	27.5
5	Franco Columbu	Italy	23.25
6	Jon Cole	United States	21.5
7	Mike Dayton	United States	19.25
8	George Frenn	United States	10

Preceded by None	1977 World's Strongest Man	Succeeded by 1978 World's Strongest Man
