= Ollolai =

Municipality and town in Sardinia, Italy

- Comune
- Comune di Ollolai
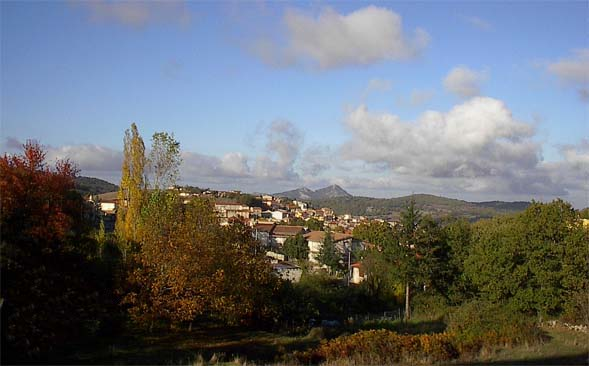
- View of Ollolai

- Coat of arms

- Location of Ollolai in Sardinia
- Coordinates: 40°10′08″N 9°10′45″E
- Country: Italy
- Region: Sardinia
- Province: Nuoro (NU)

Government
  - Mayor: Francesco Columbu

Area
  - Total: 27.24 km^{2} (10.52 sq mi)
- Elevation: 970 m (3,180 ft)

Population (2026)
  - Total: 1,129
  - Density: 41.45/km^{2} (107.3/sq mi)
- Demonym: Ollolaesi (Ollolaèsos in Sardinian)
- Time zone: UTC+1 (CET)
  - Summer (DST): UTC+2 (CEST)
- Postal code: 08020
- Dialing code: 0784
- ISTAT code: 091056
- Patron saint: St. Michael Archangel
- Saint day: 29 September
- Website: www.ollolai.com

Ollolai is a town and comune (municipality) in the province of Nuoro in the autonomous island region of Sardinia in Italy. It is the main town of the Barbagia di Ollolai. It has 1,129 inhabitants.

Following the 2024 United States presidential election, the town announced it would offer homes in need of renovation for one euro to Americans wishing to relocate to Ollolai. The town also offers free temporary homes to digital nomads and ready-to-occupy houses for up to €100,000 (US$105,000). Ollolai's mayor said the town received 38,000 requests in the weeks following the election.

== Demographics ==
As of 2026, the population is 1,129, of which 49.9% are male, and 50.1% are female. Minors make up 12.3% of the population, and seniors make up 31.4%.

Historical population

Year	Pop.	±%
1861	1,014	—
1871	1,193	+17.7%
1881	1,314	+10.1%
1901	1,500	+14.2%
1911	1,721	+14.7%
1921	1,706	−0.9%
1931	1,844	+8.1%
1936	1,863	+1.0%

Year	Pop.	±%
1951	2,087	+12.0%
1961	2,283	+9.4%
1971	2,124	−7.0%
1981	2,013	−5.2%
1991	1,800	−10.6%
2001	1,579	−12.3%
2011	1,373	−13.0%
2021	1,202	−12.5%

Source: ISTAT

=== Immigration ===
As of 2025, immigrants make up 2.7% of the population. The 5 largest foreign countries of birth are Germany, Romania, France, Ukraine, and Belgium.

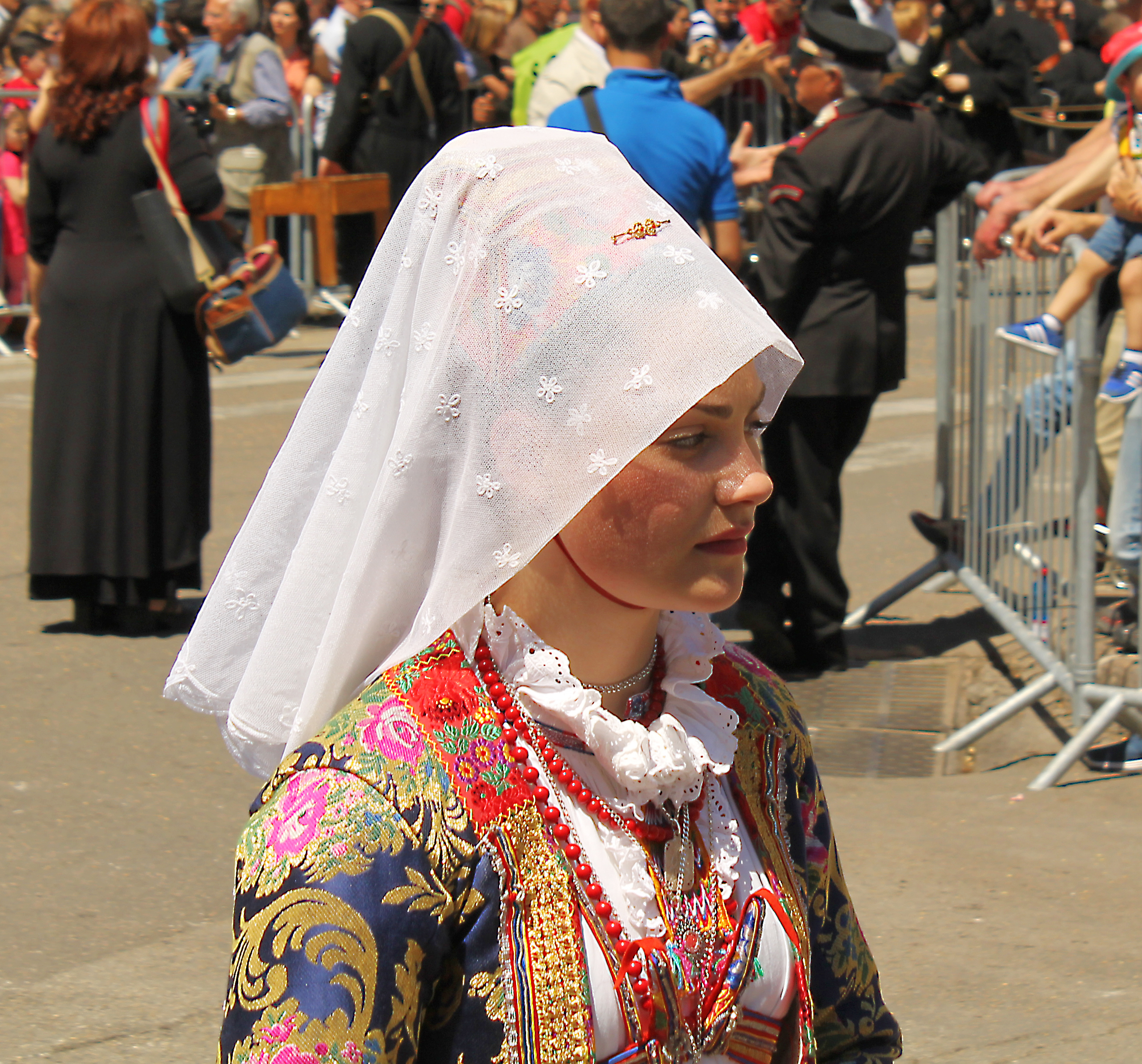
Woman in a traditional Ollolai dress

== Sights ==
=== Architecture ===
The main square of the village was created in the early 20th century by diverting the stream that crossed it. Inside it lies a church dedicated to St. Michael the Archangel, which contains paintings by Carmelo Floris in the apse as well as a crucifix painted by Franco Bussu, an inhabitant of Ollolai. The oldest part of the church is a chapel dedicated to St. Bartholomew.

Near the town centre, there is another church dedicated to Anthony of Padua, where the Feast of Saint Anthony is traditionally held along with a lighting of a bonfire.

A few kilometres (miles) from the village towards the valley, there lies a church dedicated to Saint Peter, rebuilt in the 1970s after the demolition of a Romanesque church.

In a valley surrounded by granite peaks lies a church dedicated to Basil of Caesarea, built by the Basilian monks and used, after the expulsion of the Basilians, by the Franciscans. The adjoining convent was built later.

=== Water features ===
The town is abundant in water features. The most famous is Gupunnio, the source of which is in the centre of the village, and was recently renamed Regina Fontium. There is also the fountain of Su Sapunadorju, and a few hundred metres (feet) from the town, Su Puthu, which was once used as a watering hole.

== Notable people ==
- Michele Columbu (1914–2012), leader of the Sardinian Action Party (Sardinian nationalist party)
- Franco Columbu (no relation, 1941–2019), bodybuilder and actor, twice Mr. Olympia
- Arnold Schwarzenegger (born 1947), Austrian and American actor and politician, honorary citizen of Ollolai
