= Bruce Wilhelm =

American strongman (born 1945)

Personal information
- Born: July 13, 1945 (age 81) (United States) Sunnyvale, California
- Occupations: Strongman, Olympic weightlifting, Shot put
- Height: 6 ft 2 in (1.88 m)
Medal record
Men's Weightlifting
Pan American Games
Silver medal – second place	Mexico City 1975	+ 110 kg
Strongman
Representing United States
World's Strongest Man
1st	1977 World's Strongest Man
1st	1978 World's Strongest Man

Bruce Wilhelm (born July 13, 1945) is a former weightlifter and strongman from the United States. He is a two-time winner of the World's Strongest Man competition in 1977 and 1978 and the author of numerous strength-related articles and books. He was a member of the executive board of the United States Olympic Committee. He was also on the Athletes Advisory Council for 8 years as well as the Substance and Drug Abuse Committee, the Sports Medicine Committee, and the Games Preparation Committee.

== Athletics ==
Wilhelm was a high school track and field star for Fremont High School (Sunnyvale, California), and was the 1963 CIF California State Meet shot put champion as well as runner up in the discus competition. He won the Golden West Invitational high school shot put. He continued his athletic development at Stanford University, competing in shot, discus and wrestling. He was the 1965 AAWU Conference Wrestling Champion and finished the season undefeated with 21 victories. He finished 4th in the 1966 AAU National Freestyle Wrestling and Greco Roman Championships (unlimited weight class).

After one year at Stanford, Wilhelm transferred to Oklahoma State University, where, in addition to competing in the shot put, he was also a member of the varsity wrestling team.

He placed in the top 10 US Men's Shot rankings for 1967 (9th), 1969 (5th), 1970 (3rd), 1971 (4th), 1972 (8th), and 1973 (3rd). Wilhelm is still is #251 on the all-time world shot put records, with a mark of 20.12m (66'-1/4") set on July 8, 1972, during the Olympic trials.

=== Weightlifting ===
Wilhelm became a weightlifter, and was the US National AAU Super Heavyweight Weightlifting Champion for both 1975 and 1976. He won a silver medal for the United States at the 1975 Pan-American Games in Mexico City in the +110 kg division, and placed 5th at the 1976 Olympic Games in Montreal, QC, Canada.

=== World's Strongest Man ===
Wilhelm won the inaugural World's Strongest Man competition in 1977, and returned to win again in 1978. He then spent several years helping to organize and officiate further contests.
