= Stand Tall (film) =

- Directed by: Mark Nalley
- Produced by: Mark Nalley
- Starring: Arnold Schwarzenegger; Lou Ferrigno; Boyer Coe
- Distributed by: World Tour Productions
- Release date: 1997
- Running time: 84 minutes
- Language: English
- Budget: $200,000

Stand Tall is a 1997 documentary film about bodybuilding. It centers on Lou Ferrigno's battle with hearing loss and his rise to prominence on the world bodybuilding stage. Bodybuilding legends Joe Weider and Arnold Schwarzenegger also appear in the film, as well as notable bodybuilders like Robby Robinson.

== Home media ==
In 2003, the film was included as a bonus feature in a double-disc set of The Incredible Hulk Returns and The Trial of the Incredible Hulk.
