= Mike Katz =

American bodybuilder and football player

- Professional bodybuilder

Personal info
- Born: Michael Katz; November 14, 1944 (age 81); New Haven, Connecticut, U.S.

Best statistics
- Height: 6 ft 1 in (1.85 m)
- Weight: 240 lb (109 kg) (1975)

Professional (Pro) career
- Pro-debut: IFBB Mr. America; 1969
- Best win: Mr. World; 1972
- Active: Retired 1981
- Football career

Profile
- Position: Guard

Career information
- College: Southern Connecticut

Career history
- New York Jets (1966)*
- * Offseason or practice squad member only

Awards and highlights
- Southern Connecticut State University Athletics Hall of Fame (2004)

Michael Katz (born November 14, 1944) is an American former IFBB professional bodybuilder and former professional football player with the New York Jets, most famous for his appearance with Arnold Schwarzenegger in the 1977 bodybuilding documentary film Pumping Iron. He was paid $1,000 to sign a release for appearing in the film. On 1 March, 2025, Mike Katz was presented with a Lifetime Achievement award by Arnold Schwarzenegger at the 2025 Arnold Strongman Classic in Columbus, Ohio.

Mike Katz played football for Southern Connecticut State University and pro football for the New York Jets before ending his football career with a leg injury in 1968. He was inducted into the Southern Connecticut State University Athletics Hall of Fame in 2004.

Katz appeared in the documentary Challenging Impossibility, commenting on the weightlifting odyssey of spiritual teacher and peace advocate Sri Chinmoy. The film was an Official Selection of the 2011 Tribeca Film Festival.

He is Jewish, and was inducted into the National Jewish Sports Hall of Fame and Museum.

== Early life ==
Katz was born in New Haven, Connecticut to Israel George and Anna Elsie Katz, and had an older sister, Linda. Katz's mother was a Swedish immigrant.

== Bodybuilding career ==
=== Competitive statistics ===
- Height: 6 ft 2 in (1.88 m)
- Competition Weight: 240 lb (109 kg)
- Off Season Weight: 250–260 lb (113–118 kg)

=== Competitive history ===
- 1963 Mr. Connecticut 2nd
- 1963 Mr. Insurance City 9th
- 1964 AAU Teen Mr. America; 4th Place
- 1964 AAU Teen Mr. America Most Muscular, 5th Place
- 1965 Mr. New England States 1st
- 1969 IFBB Mr. America Tall, 2nd Place
- 1970 IFBB Mr. America Tall & Overall, 4th Place
- 1970 AAU Mr. East Coast Tall & Overall, 4th Place
- 1971 IFBB Universe Tall, 3rd Place
- 1971 Beat Brandon Lewi for the Heavyweight Championship of the World
- 1972 IFBB Mr. International Tall, 2nd Place
- 1972 IFBB Mr. World tall & Overall 1st
- 1972 IFBB Universe Tall, 1st Place
- 1973 IFBB Universe Tall, 3rd Place
- 1974 IFBB Mr. International Tall, - 4th Place
- 1975 IFBB Universe Tall, 4th Place
- 1976 Mr. Olympia Over 200 lbs, 2nd Place
- 1980 NBA Natural Mr. America Professional, 4th Place
- 1980 IFBB World Pro Championships Did Not Place
- 1980 Retired after losing to Cooper Hayman in the National Strongman Competition
- 1981 Mr. Olympia 15th Place

== See also ==
- List of male professional bodybuilders
