= Robby Robinson (bodybuilder) =

American professional bodybuilder

- Professional bodybuilder

Personal info
- Nickname: The Black Prince, Mr Lifestyle
- Born: Robert Lee Robinson; May 24, 1946 (age 79); Damascus, Georgia, U.S.

Best statistics
- Height: 5 ft 7 in (170 cm)
- Weight: Contest: 200 lb (91 kg); Off-season: 213 lb (97 kg)

Professional (Pro) career
- Pro-debut: IFBB Mr America, Mr World, Mr Universe; 1975
- Best win: IFBB Mr Olympia Master; 1994
- Active: 1975–2001

Robby Robinson (born May 24, 1946) is an American former professional bodybuilder. Known early in his career as Robin Robinson, he is also known as The Black Prince and Mr Lifestyle. He won various competitions including Mr America, IFBB Mr. World, Mr Universe, Masters Olympia, and other titles of the International Federation of BodyBuilding & Fitness (IFBB), and appeared in several films (including the landmark docudrama Pumping Iron) over a 27-year career as a professional bodybuilder, retiring from competition in 2001 at the age of 55.

== Biography ==
=== Early years ===
Robinson was born in Damascus, Georgia, and raised in Tallahassee, Florida. His mother was illiterate, and his father was a bootlegger who later abandoned his 14 children. Robinson attended Florida A&M University, where he competed in both football and track & field. While training for those sports he noticed his body's great responsiveness to weight training, which motivated him to enter his first bodybuilding competition. After competing in more than 300 amateur competitions, Robinson turned professional in 1975. By that year he was married with three children.

=== Professional years ===
In his first year as a professional in 1975, he won the IFBB Mr America, Mr World and Mr Universe titles. He went on to win many IFBB contests, including the first annual Night of the Champions in 1979 as well as the first Masters Olympia in 1994. He was the Masters Olympia overall champion the first year that the event was held in 1994 and won the 50+ division at the same contest in 1997 and 2000.

Robinson appeared as himself in the 1977 part-scripted, part-documentary film on bodybuilding Pumping Iron. He also appeared in a 1989 TV documentary, in the 1997 documentary Stand Tall, and (uncredited) in the 1976 film comedy Stay Hungry.

=== Post-retirement ===
Robinson suffers from intermittent bouts of sickle cell crisis. These episodes tended to occur during contest preps, and became one of the reasons he decided to stop competing.

After a 26-year career, Robinson retired from professional bodybuilding at the age of 55. He has remained active in various ways, including as a personal trainer, lifestyle and bodybuilding coach, athlete, artist, and actor. As a published author, Robinson published his autobiography, The Black Prince, in 2013. Since his retirement in 2001, Robby has opposed steroid use in bodybuilding, saying that "it's taking away from the beauty of bodybuilding, the artistry of it." In 2016, aged 70, Robinson continued to make guest posing appearances and maintains a developed physique.

== Publications ==
- The Black Prince: My Life in Bodybuilding; Muscle vs Hustle, self-published memoirs, 2013 (ISBN 978-1453717875)
- Built DVD – Documentary on bodybuilding, training and health, including interviews with Robinson and workout techniques, 2006
- Master Class with Robby Robinson DVD – featuring Robinson's Master Class on bodybuilding in Venice, California (with Natural Mr Britain Ian Duckett and biomechanic expert Dean Murray)
- The Black Prince 2: Diary of a Bodybuilder, self-published compilation of bodybuilding techniques, 2019
- Robby Robinson Master Class Android App
- Robby Robinson Master Class iOS App

== Major competition awards ==
Robinson's competition awards have included the following:

- 2000 - Mr Olympia - Masters Over 50, 1st
- 1997 - Mr Olympia - Masters Over 50, 1st
- 1994 - Mr Olympia - Masters - IFBB, Winner
- 1991 - Musclefest Grand Prix - IFBB, Winner
- 1989 - World Pro Championships - IFBB, Winner
- 1988 - Niagara Falls Pro Invitational - IFBB, Winner
- 1987 - Mr Olympia - IFBB, 5th
- 1981 - Mr Universe - Pro - NABBA, Winner
- 1979 - Pittsburgh Pro Invitational - IFBB, Winner
- 1979 - Night of Champions - IFBB, Winner
- 1979 - Grand Prix New York - IFBB, Winner
- 1979 - Best in the World - IFBB, Professional, 1st
- 1978 - Professional World Cup - IFBB, Winner
- 1978 - Night of Champions - IFBB, Winner
- 1978 - Mr Olympia Heavyweight, 1st
- 1977 - Mr Olympia - IFBB, Tall, 1st
- 1976 - Mr Universe - IFBB, MiddleWeight, 1st
- 1976 - Mr Universe - IFBB, Overall Winner
- 1976 - Mr International - IFBB, Medium, 1st
- 1976 - Mr International - IFBB, Overall Winner
- 1975 - Mr Universe - IFBB, Medium, 1st
- 1975 - Mr World - IFBB, Medium, 1st
- 1975 - Mr World - IFBB, Overall Winner
- 1975 - Mr America - IFBB, Medium, 1st
- 1975 - Mr America - IFBB, Overall Winner

== See also ==
- List of male professional bodybuilders
- List of female professional bodybuilders
