= Ed Corney =

American bodybuilder (1933–2019)

- Professional bodybuilder
- Corney in the 1970s

Personal info
- Born: Edward Charles Corney; November 9, 1933; Honolulu, Territory of Hawaii, U.S.
- Died: January 1, 2019 (aged 85); Manteca, California, U.S.

Best statistics
- Height: 5 ft 7 in (1.70 m)

Professional (Pro) career
- Pro-debut: 1967
- Best win: IFBB Mr. Universe; 1972
- Active: 1967–1998

Edward Charles Corney (November 9, 1933 – January 1, 2019) was an American professional bodybuilder. He won many prizes in his 30s, including Mr. Universe in 1972, and was featured in the 1977 bodybuilding docudrama Pumping Iron. Known for his excellent posing routines, he continued competitive bodybuilding into his 60s, winning the 60+ division of the Masters Olympia twice. Corney was inducted in the International Federation of Bodybuilding Hall of Fame in 2004.

== Early life ==
Corney was born on November 9, 1933, in Honolulu, then in the Territory of Hawaii. After graduating from the Saint Louis School in 1952, he served four years in the United States Coast Guard. After his service, he worked first as an aviation radio mechanic in Oakland, California, and then "a full-time bar owner and bouncer" in San Jose.

== Bodybuilding career ==
Corney began bodybuilding at the age of 27 after being impressed with the physiques of an opposing volleyball team made up of bodybuilders. Standing at 5 ft 7 in (1.70 m), Corney won the first contest he competed in, Mr. Fremont 1967, at the age of 33. In 1968, he added Mr. Heart of California, Mr. Northern California, Mr. Westerner, and Mr. Golden West to his amateur titles.

In the 1970s, Corney continued to climb the bodybuilding ladder with wins at the 1970 Iron Man and the 1971 AAU Mr. California. He entered the professional ranks with wins at the 1971 IFBB Mr. USA and the 1972 IFBB Mr. America. His best career win came in 1972, capturing the IFBB Mr. Universe title in Baghdad, Iraq. He also won the IFBB Mr. America in 1972, and Mr. World in 1973 and 1974.

Corney appeared in the 1977 bodybuilding documentary Pumping Iron. In one scene, he collapses in exhaustion after an intense squat workout with training partner Arnold Schwarzenegger. Later in the film, Schwarzenegger is enthralled watching Corney's disciplined posing routine, saying, "Can you believe that? I mean, that—that's what I call posing!" Corney was also featured on the cover of the film's book companion, Pumping Iron: The Art and Sport of Bodybuilding by Charles Gaines and George Butler.

Corney continued to compete in the 1980s. In a 1985 interview, he acknowledged using steroids, though he attributed his success to "97 percent training and three percent steroids." In 1994, Corney won the 60+ division of the Masters Olympia. He won again in 1995, he was placed 11th overall in 1996, and he took second in the 60+ division in 1997. He also competed in 1998 in the only Masters event ever to be held at the Arnold Schwarzenegger Classic. Corney remained active in bodybuilding up until his death. He was inducted into the IFBB Hall of Fame in 2004.

== Personal life and death ==
In 1999, Corney suffered a heart attack while undergoing shoulder surgery, and subsequently suffered two strokes as an after-effect of his heart attack. Despite the health setbacks, he continued to train.

Corney suffered a brain aneurysm on December 25, 2018, and died on January 1, 2019, at the age of 85 at his home in Manteca, California. Shortly after his death, former California Governor Arnold Schwarzenegger tweeted, "Ed Corney was a jewel of a guy. He was one of the greatest posers bodybuilding has ever seen, and he was a fantastic training partner. He inspired me and I’ll miss him dearly. My thoughts are with his family."

== Contest history ==
Year	Federation	Contest	Division	Finish
1967		Mr. Fremont		1st
1967		Mr. Central California		1st
1968		Mr. Heart of California		1st
1968	AAU	Mr. Northern California		1st
1968		Mr. Westerner		1st
1968		Mr. Golden West		1st
1968	AAU	Mr. California		5th
1969	AAU	Mr. Western America		1st
1970		Mr. Pacific Coast		1st
1970		Iron Man		1st
1970	AAU	Mr. America		11th
1970	AAU	Mr. California	Most Muscular	2nd
1971	AAU	Mr. America		4th
1971	IFBB	Mr. America	Short	1st
1971	AAU	Mr. California	Most Muscular	1st
1971	IFBB	Mr. USA	Short & Overall	1st
1971	IFBB	Mr. Universe	Medium	3rd
1972	IFBB	Mr. America	Short & Overall	1st
1972	IFBB	Mr. International	Short	1st
1972	IFBB	Mr. Universe	Medium & Overall	1st
1973	IFBB	Mr. World	Medium	1st
1974	IFBB	Mr. International	Short	1st
1974	IFBB	Mr. World	Short	1st
1975		Mr. Olympia	Lightweight	2nd
1975	IFBB	World Pro Championships	Lightweight	2nd
1976		Mr. Olympia	Lightweight	3rd
1977		Mr. Olympia		3rd
1977		Mr. Olympia	Short	2nd
1978	IFBB	Night of Champions		4th
1978		Mr. Olympia		7th
1978		Mr. Olympia	Lightweight	4th
1979	IFBB	Canada Pro Cup		Did Not Place
1979	IFBB	Grand Prix Pennsylvania		Did Not Place
1979	IFBB	Night of Champions		8th
1979		Mr. Olympia	Lightweight	9th
1979	IFBB	Pittsburgh Pro Invitational		8th
1979	IFBB	Southern Pro Cup		7th
1979	IFBB	World Pro Championships		5th
1980	IFBB	Grand Prix Miami		6th
1980	IFBB	Grand Prix Pennsylvania		6th
1980	IFBB	Night of Champions		4th
1980		Mr. Olympia		11th
1980	IFBB	Pittsburgh Pro Invitational		6th
1980	IFBB	Universe Pro		Did Not Place
1980	IFBB	World Pro Championships		Did Not Place
1981		Mr. Olympia		13th
1983		Mr. Olympia		14th
1989		Superbowl of Bodybuilding PBA		4th
1994		Masters Mr. Olympia		10th
1994		Masters Mr. Olympia	60+ Category	1st
1995		Masters Mr. Olympia		11th
1995		Masters Mr. Olympia	60+ Category	1st
1996		Masters Mr. Olympia		11th
1997		Masters Mr. Olympia	60+ Category	2nd
1998		Arnold Schwarzenegger Classic	Masters	10th

== See also ==
- List of male professional bodybuilders
- List of people from Hawaii
