= 1989 Mr. Olympia =

Italian IFBB professional bodybuilding competition

The 1989 Mr. Olympia contest was an IFBB professional bodybuilding competition held on September 8-9, 1989, at Sala Dei Congressi in Rimini, Italy.

== Results ==
The total prize money awarded was $170,000. Individual prize amounts were not announced.

Place	Name
1	(United States) Lee Haney
2	(United States) Lee Labrada
3	(United States) Vince Taylor
4	(United States) Rich Gaspari
5	(Algeria) Mohammed Benaziza
6	(United States) Mike Christian
7	(United States) Mike Quinn
8	(United Kingdom) Brian Buchanan
9	(Lebanon) Samir Bannout
10	(United States) Ron Love
11	(United Kingdom) Bertil Fox
12	(France) Francis Benfatto
13	(Austria) Andreas Münzer
14	(United States) Bob Paris
15	(Barbados) Albert Beckles
16	(Italy) Armando Defant
16	(India) Premchand Degra
16	(Czech Republic) Pavol Jablonický
16	(United States) Juan Marquez
16	(United States) Tom Terwilliger
16	(United States) Dean Tornabene

== Notable events ==
- Lee Haney won his sixth consecutive Mr. Olympia title, tying Arnold Schwarzenegger for consecutive wins.
- At 256 pounds, Haney outweighed second-place finisher Lee Labrada by 81 pounds.
