= 1983 Mr. Olympia =

Bodybuilding competition

The 1983 Mr. Olympia contest was an IFBB professional bodybuilding competition held on September 24, 1983, at the Olympiahalle in Munich, Germany.

== Results ==
Total prize money awarded was $50,000.

| Place | Prize | Name |
|---|---|---|
| 1 | $25,000 | (Lebanon) Samir Bannout |
| 2 | $10,000 | (Egypt) Mohamed Makkawy |
| 3 | $6000 | (United States) Lee Haney |
| 4 | $4000 | (United States) Frank Zane |
| 5 | $3000 | (United Kingdom) Bertil Fox |
| 6 | $2000 | (Germany) Jusup Wilkosz |
| 7 | | (Barbados) Albert Beckles |
| 8 | | (United Kingdom) Johnny Fuller |
| 9 | | (Germany) Hubert Metz |
| 10 | | (France) Jacques Neuville |
| 11 | | (United States) James Gaubert |
| 12 | | (United States) Dale Ruplinger |
| 13 | | (France) Gerard Buinoud |
| 14 | | (United States) Ed Corney |
| 15 | | (United States) Lance Dreher |

== Notable events ==
- Samir Bannout won the Mr. Olympia title in his fourth attempt
- Chris Dickerson, the 1982 champion, did not compete
- Frank Zane, a three time Mr. Olympia winner, retired after this competition.
