= 1984 Mr. Olympia =

Bodybuilding competition

The 1984 Mr. Olympia contest was an IFBB professional bodybuilding competition held on November 3, 1984 at the Felt Forum in New York City, New York.

== Results ==
Total prize money awarded was $100,000.

Place	Prize	Name
1	$50,000	(United States) Lee Haney
2	$25,000	(Egypt) Mohamed Makkawy
3	$10,000	(Germany) Jusup Wilkosz
4	$6,000	(Barbados) Albert Beckles
5	$4,000	(Barbados) Roy Callender
6	$2500	(Lebanon) Samir Bannout
7	$2000	(United States) Bob Paris
8	$2000	(Cuba) Sergio Oliva
9	$1000	(United States) Tom Platz
10	$1000	(United States) Bob Birdsong
11		(United States) Chris Dickerson
12		(United States) Tony Pearson
13		(United States) Boyer Coe
14		(United States) Chuck Williams
15		(United States) Bill Grant
16		(United States) Charles Glass
17		(United States) Robby Robinson
18		(Germany) Hubert Metz
19		(United States) James Gaubert
20		(Netherlands) Appie Steenbeek

== Notable events ==
- Lee Haney won his first Mr. Olympia title
- the event had the highest attendance for the prejudging (4,200) and finals (5,000) and the largest amount of total prize money ($100,000) for any Olympia up to that time
