= 1988 Mr. Olympia =

Bodybuilding competition

The 1988 Mr. Olympia contest was an IFBB professional bodybuilding competition held at the Universal Amphitheater on September 10, 1988, in Los Angeles, California.

== Results ==
The total prize money awarded was $155,000. All 20 competitors received prize money. Haney won $60,000, Gaspari $27,000, and DeMey $15,000.

Place	Name
1	(United States) Lee Haney
2	(United States) Rich Gaspari
3	(Netherlands) Berry de Mey
4	(United States) Lee Labrada
5	(United States) Gary Strydom
6	(United States) Mike Quinn
7	(United Kingdom) Brian Buchanan
8	(Lebanon) Samir Bannout
9	(United States) Ron Love
10	(United States) Bob Paris
11	(Algeria) Mohammed Benaziza
12	(United States) Phil Hill
13	(United States) Shawn Ray
14	(United States) Michael Ashley
15	(Barbados) Albert Beckles
16	(Lebanon) Edward Kawak
17	(United States) Robby Robinson
18	(Germany) Peter Hensel
19	(Brazil) Luiz Freitas
20	(Germany) Ralf Moeller

== Notable events ==
- Lee Haney won his fifth consecutive Mr. Olympia title
- 8 of the 20 competitors were making their Olympia debuts; and it was the youngest Olympia lineup ever, with everyone in the top seven in his 20s.
