= 1986 Mr. Olympia =

International bodybuilding contest

The 1986 Mr. Olympia contest was an IFBB professional bodybuilding competition held on October 11, 1986, at the Veterans Memorial Auditorium in Columbus, Ohio.

== Results ==
Total prize money awarded was $120,000.

Place	Prize	Name
1	$55,000	(United States) Lee Haney
2	$25,000	(United States) Rich Gaspari
3	$13,000	(United States) Mike Christian
4	$9,000	(Barbados) Albert Beckles
5	$6,000	(Netherlands) Berry de Mey
6	$4,000	(Germany) Peter Hensel
7		(United Kingdom) Bertil Fox
8		(United States) Ron Love
9		(Australia) John Terilli
10		(Germany) Josef Grolmus
11		(United States) Tom Platz
12		(Germany) Jusup Wilkosz
13		(Lebanon) Edward Kawak
14		(United Kingdom) Frank Richard
15		(United States) Gary Leonard

== Notable events ==
- Lee Haney won his third consecutive Mr. Olympia title
- Last Mr Olympia competition for Tom Platz and Jusup Wilkosz
