= World Bodybuilding Federation =

American bodybuilding organization

- Formation: September 15, 1990
- Dissolved: July 1992
- Purpose: Professional bodybuilding
- Parent organization: Titan Sports

The World Bodybuilding Federation (WBF) was a bodybuilding organization founded in 1991 by Vince McMahon. It operated as a subsidiary of his company Titan Sports, the owners of the World Wrestling Federation (WWF, now WWE). Tom Platz announced the WBF during the closing ceremonies of the International Federation of BodyBuilding (IFBB) Mr. Olympia competition in September 1990, which he and McMahon had attended as representatives of an accompanying magazine.

The WBF aimed to bring bigger prize money and more "dramatic" events to the sport of bodybuilding; its events would incorporate presentation elements inspired by professional wrestling, such as competitors being given ring names and kayfabe personas that were showcased in entertainment-based segments and rounds. WWF television programming featured cross-promotion for the WBF, while the organization would later launch its own weekly television program, WBF BodyStars. The organization signed long-term contracts with a number of IFBB regulars to join its roster, with annual salaries as high as $400,000.

The WBF held its inaugural championship on June 15, 1991, as a pay-per-view (PPV) event in Atlantic City, receiving mixed reviews for its attempts to mix bodybuilding with WWF-style sports entertainment gimmicks. The second WBF championship was held in Long Beach on June 13, 1992. Amid a steroid scandal impacting the WWF, the WBF introduced drug testing in March 1992—which resulted in many of the competitors being relatively out-of-shape during the ensuing competition. Attempts to have bodybuilder Lou Ferrigno (who left the organization shortly after the drug testing policy was implemented) and former WCW wrestler Lex Luger (who was injured in a motorcycling accident) participate in the event also did not come to fruition.

The 1992 WBF Championship PPV was a commercial failure, with only around 3,000 buys. A month later on July 15, 1992, McMahon personally phoned Ben and Joe Weider—the co-founders of the IFBB—to inform them that the WBF would be dissolved. The IFBB—which had prohibited those who joined the WBF from participating in its events—agreed to allow WBF members to rejoin the organization after paying a fine.

South African bodybuilder Gary Strydom would be the first and only WBF champion, winning the 1991 event and successfully defending his title in 1992.

== History ==
=== Creation ===
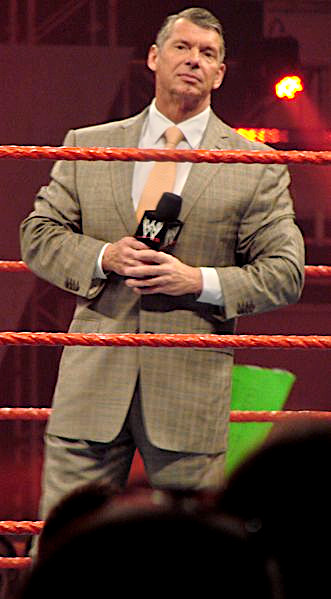
McMahon in 2007.

In 1990, as part of an effort to diversify beyond his flagship professional wrestling business, the World Wrestling Federation (WWF), Vince McMahon's Titan Sports began to make investments in the sport of bodybuilding. Several WWF performers of the era—including Jimmy Snuka and Ultimate Warrior—had a background in bodybuilding. During the Royal Rumble pay-per-view (PPV) in 1989, Ultimate Warrior competed in a "Super Posedown" against Rick Rude, which was judged by the audience. After inevitably losing every round to Warrior, Rude attacked him with a metal exercise bar—setting up a feud that would culminate with him defeating Warrior at WrestleMania V for the WWF Intercontinental Heavyweight Championship.

Titan hired bodybuilder Tom Platz to oversee a new magazine known as Bodybuilding Lifestyles, and McMahon invested in a new line of bodybuilding supplements known as ICOPRO (Integrated Conditioning Program). While rumors emerged that McMahon was also planning to establish a competitor to the long-established International Federation of BodyBuilding (IFBB), the WWF initially denied the reports. Bodybuilding Lifestyles purchased a booth at the IFBB's Mr. Olympia competition on September 15, 1990, in Chicago, where Platz and McMahon made appearances and signed autographs.

During the closing ceremonies, Platz took to the stage to represent the magazine as one of the event's sponsors. Unbeknownst to those in attendance, Platz used that platform to announce that Titan Sports would be forming the World Bodybuilding Federation as a direct competitor to the IFBB, and proclaimed that they planned to "kick the IFBB's ass". A group of models with Bodybuilding Lifestyles sashes entered the auditorium to distribute a WBF pamphlet to the stunned audience, while contract offers were slipped under the doors of the competitors' hotel rooms.

A press release issued by the WBF stated that it would "revamp professional bodybuilding with dramatic new events and the richest prize money in the history of the sport." It also announced that Tom Platz would be Director of Talent Development for the organization. In a press conference the next day, McMahon explained that the WBF planned to feature "bodybuilding the way it was meant to be". The comment was interpreted by some as a thinly veiled reference to a lack of testing for anabolic steroids; the 1990 Mr. Olympia competition was the first to employ drug testing of participants, but poor reception to the resulting quality of the competition by attendees led the IFBB to reverse course the following year.

In the wake of the announcement, IFBB co-founder Ben Weider commented that Platz and McMahon's ambush marketing "wasn't a sophisticated or very honorable thing to do", but that he wasn't angry, and that "if we'd wanted to, we could have turned off Platz's microphone or stopped his people from distributing their literature. But what the heck, we let them have their fun." The IFBB warned that it would blacklist bodybuilders who joined the WBF, and ban them from their competitions.

The WBF offered multi-year contracts of at least $100,000 per year, in addition to the prize money that would be offered at its events. During a press event on January 30, 1991, at New York City's Plaza Hotel, McMahon announced the WBF's inaugural roster of 13 bodybuilders, and that the organization's inaugural championship would be held as a PPV on June 15, 1991, in Atlantic City. The roster included a number of IBFF regulars, including Danny Padilla and Tony Pearson, while Flex reported that the WBF's three-year contract with South African bodybuilder Gary Strydom was valued at $400,000 per year.

In an effort to compete with the WBF, the IFBB increased the top prize of Mr. Olympia 1991 to $100,000. Its 1991 Night of Champions event featured an opening skit mocking the WBF, with its competitors destroying tombstones engraved with the names of the WBF's roster.

=== 1991 championship ===
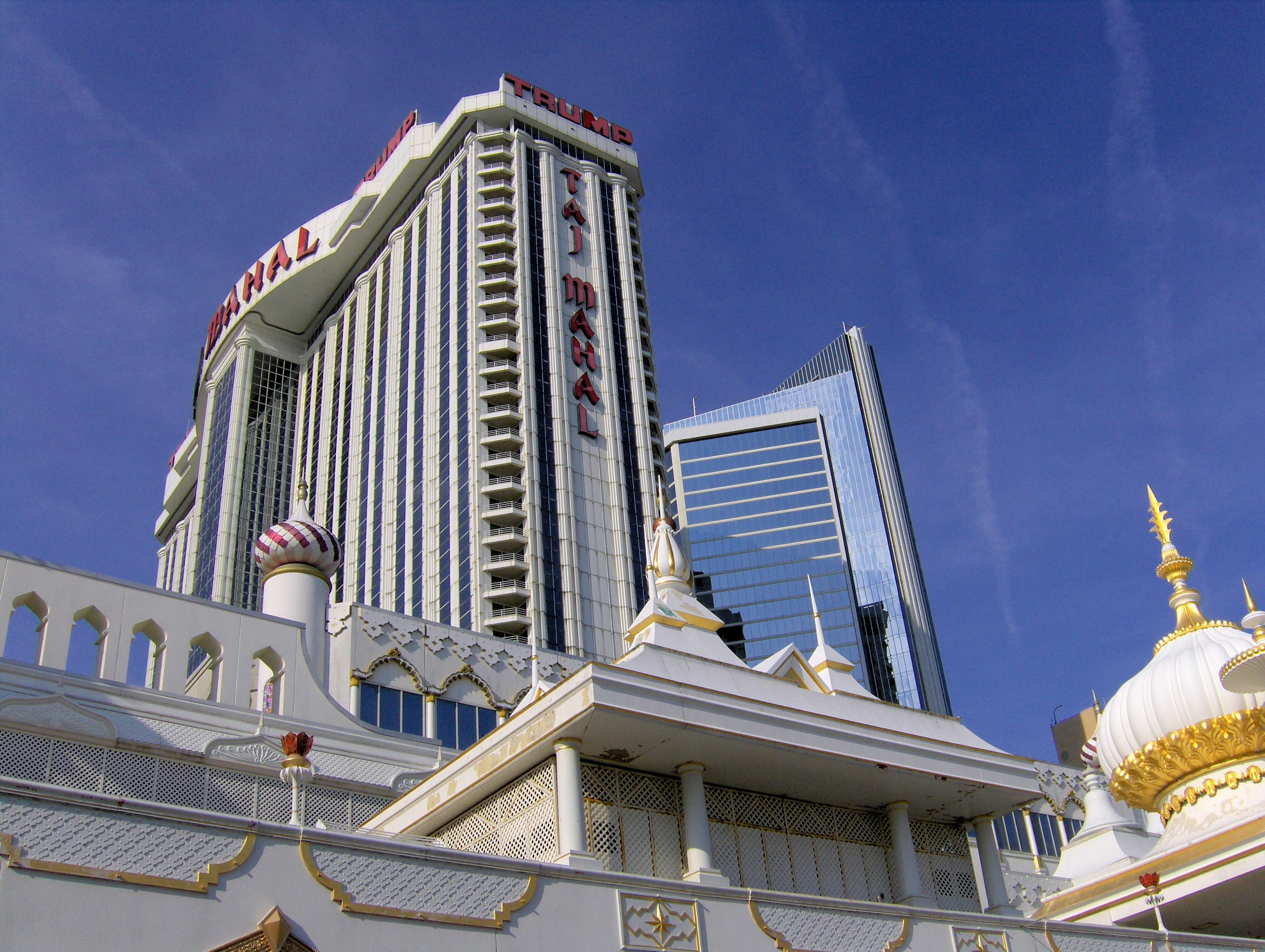
The Taj Mahal in Atlantic City, host venue of the 1991 WBF Championship.

Despite assurances by Platz that the WBF would not attempt to mix traditional bodybuilding competitions with professional wrestling, the WBF would ultimately feature sports entertainment elements. Members of its roster were promoted as "WBF BodyStars" (in a similar fashion to the WWF marketing its performers as "WWF Superstars"), given ring names such as Tony "The Jet Man" Pearson, and had entrance videos during competitions which showcased their kayfabe persona. WWF television programming was used to cross-promote the inaugural WBF Championship, with segments that featured the WBF roster and wrestlers such as "Macho Man" Randy Savage cutting promos for the event. In turn, both the WBF and WWF would be used to promote the ICOPRO supplement system.

The 1991 WBF Championship would be held at the Trump Taj Mahal in Atlantic City. It was co-hosted by Regis Philbin and WWF manager Bobby "The Brain" Heenan, with guest appearances by Miss Elizabeth, Randy Savage and Ultimate Warrior. The competition would consist of two mandatory pose rounds, followed by an "entertainment" round, which consisted of pre-recorded skits in kayfabe that concluded live on-stage. Gary Strydom would win the competition, receiving the WBF Championship title and a prize of $275,000.

The PPV was met with mixed reviews: some critics praised its high production values and emphasis on the competitors' personalities, but felt that its use of sports entertainment gimmicks drew too many comparisons to wrestling.

=== Introduction of a drug testing policy, 1992 championship ===
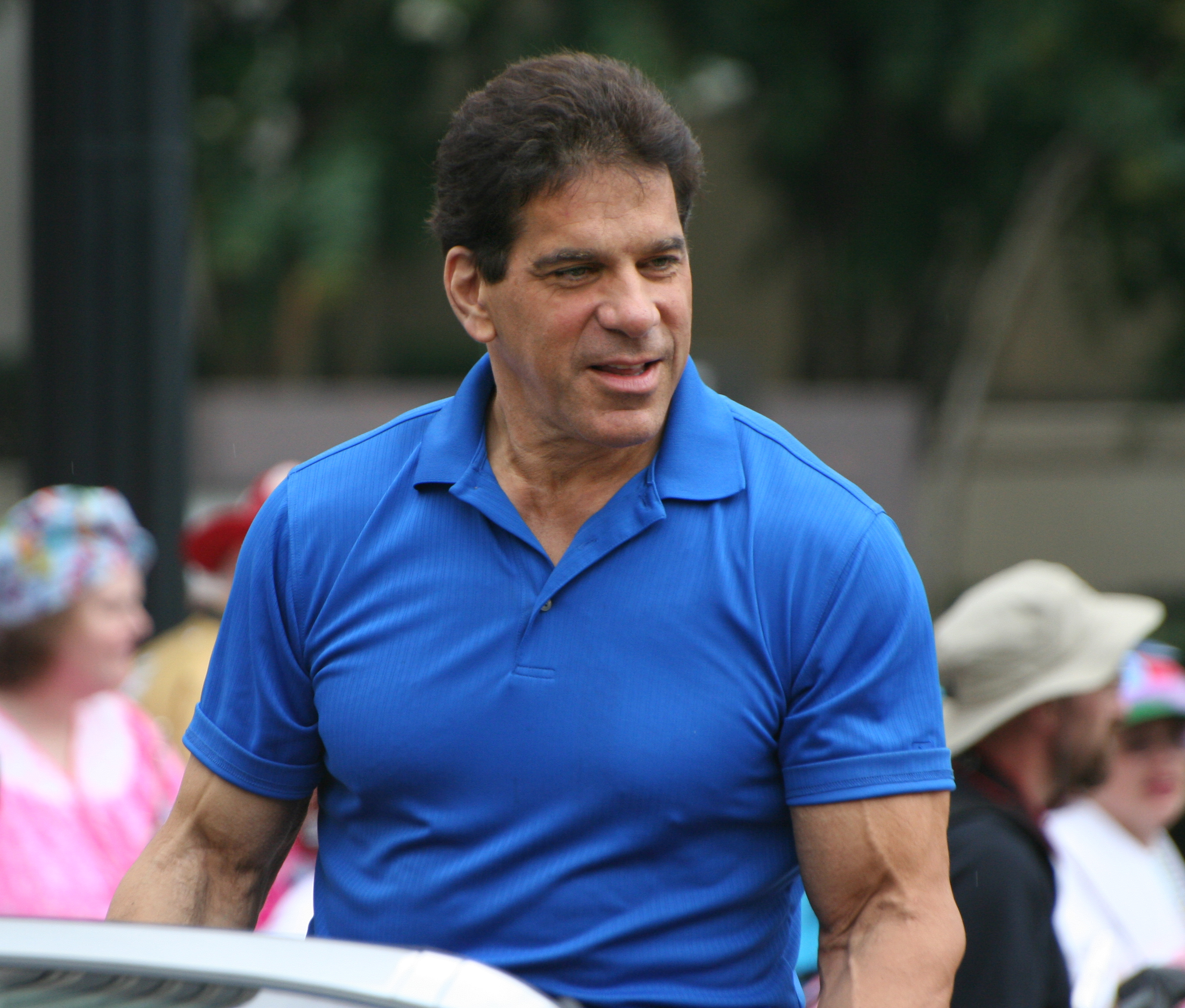
Lou Ferrigno (seen in 2009) was signed by the WBF in 1991, but never competed in any events.

In June 1991, shortly after the WBF Championship, former WWF ringside doctor George Zahorian was convicted of illegally supplying anabolic steroids to multiple WWF wrestlers. The WWF would introduce a drug testing policy shortly afterward.

In a bid to boost mainstream interest in its competitions, the WBF announced in August 1991 that it would sign bodybuilder and The Incredible Hulk star Lou Ferrigno. The contract was reported to be valued at $900,000 per-year. In an interview on The Tonight Show Starring Johnny Carson, Ferrigno stated that he was attracted to the WBF for his return to competitive bodybuilding because it had the "strictest drug testing in all of professional sports." Despite claiming prior to its 1991 championship that steroid testing would be used, the WBF did not actually perform any tests during the competition.

Wrestler Lex Luger departed the WWF's main rival, World Championship Wrestling (WCW), to co-host WBF BodyStars—a weekly WBF television series that aired on USA Network. Luger was interviewed during WrestleMania VIII to promote the WBF, and was scheduled to make a guest appearance posing at the 1992 WBF Championship on June 13 in Long Beach. Promotional material for the event initially billed Ferrigno as a top contender for Strydom's WBF Championship title.

In March 1992, McMahon announced that the WBF would begin conducting drug testing; Titan Sports hired Mauro Di Pasquale to oversee the drug testing programs for both the WWF and WBF. The Wrestling Observer Newsletter wrote that in a company meeting discussing the changes, "most of the guys freaked out about being told to give up all their drugs just three months before a contest, despite many willingly spouting the drug-free company line." Ferrigno quit the WBF shortly afterward, without ever competing in its events; although he legitimately cited an upcoming carpal tunnel surgery as reasoning, it was observed that "the idea of competing without drugs, as he was so proudly talking of on Carson months earlier, apparently wasn't even considered as an option". Ferrigno would later compete at Mr. Olympia 1992.

Promotion of the 1992 WBF Championship on WBF BodyStars subsequently and repeatedly emphasized the "drug-free" nature of the event. This was despite the fact that many of the participants would fail drug tests in the weeks leading up to the event, resulting in fines and six-week suspensions that reduced morale. In their book Sex, Lies, and Headlocks, Shaun Assael and Mike Mooneyham wrote that in between BodyStars' monthly tapings, the competitors "stayed home, taking copious amounts of drugs to stay in shape while Vince was running around telling America his company was drug-free." Some of the competitors relied on Di Pasquale's ketogenic "Anabolic Diet" as an alternative to steroids.

The 1992 WBF Championship was co-hosted by Platz, McMahon, and Heenan, with WWF ring announcer "Mean" Gene Okerlund joining them as the emcee. Luger was injured in a motorcycle accident prior to the event, resulting in him being interviewed from a hospital bed during the PPV rather than making an on-stage appearance. The event would see Gary Strydom win his second consecutive WBF Championship. Most of the competitors were relatively out-of-shape due to their drug-free regimens, a fact which was frequently acknowledged by McMahon in his commentary; the Wrestling Observer Newsletter noted that "while the idea of promoting a show where the majority of participants had recently failed a steroid test as drug-free on the surface was both ludicrous and fraudulent, the funny thing is, when show time came, it appeared that in the preparatory period for the show among the crew, there was less steroid use than at any contest of that level in recent years."

=== Demise ===
The 1992 WBF Championship received only around 3,000 pay-per-view buys. Just over a month later on July 15, 1992, McMahon phoned the IFBB's co-founders Ben and Joe Weider to tell them that the WBF would be disbanded, and asked them to allow the WBF members to rejoin the IFBB. The IFBB would allow WBF members to re-join after paying a $25,000 fine; at its 1993 Night of Champions event, an opening skit referencing the 1991 event featured Dorian Yates "resurrecting" the WBF bodybuilders, who emerged from coffins and destroyed their own tombstones.

After the dissolution of the WBF, Lex Luger made his first official WWF appearance at Royal Rumble in 1993. The same year, McMahon would also be indicted by the FBI for his role in the WWF steroid scandal. In 2018, Strydom commented that despite the dissolution of the WBF, McMahon still paid him in full for the last year of his contract.

== Legacy ==
In an induction of the 1992 WBF Championship, Art O'Donnell of WrestleCrap commented that the show was "two of the silliest hours in the history of live sports", and that "watching a WBF event was like watching a WWF event, if a WWF event consisted only of the wrestlers’ entrances and the participants got paid substantially more per year."

In 2019, Bruce Prichard remarked that ICOPRO's strong association with the WBF, and the complexity of the system, were likely factors in its market failure. He explained that "the ICOPRO system was where people would often times get confused, as it wasn't just like a protein powder, it was a system. It was you take that supplement here, you take that supplement here, you take that supplement while you're working out at peak time, put this horrible tasting shit under your tongue. It was complicated." However, he did admit that the protein bars were "excellent".

For a period after the WBF's dissolution, WWF programming continued to regularly feature advertising for the ICOPRO system. This included segments sponsored by the brand, ICOPRO banners displayed in venues, wrestlers being seen wearing ICOPRO shirts, and commercials featuring WWF performers such as Bret Hart, Razor Ramon, and The Steiner Brothers. WWE has occasionally referenced ICOPRO during events paying homage to the 1990s, such as the ICOPRO banner being displayed inside Manhattan Center during the Raw 25th anniversary special in 2018, Adam Cole starring in an ICOPRO parody commercial during NXT TakeOver: In Your House in 2020, and an ICOPRO sponsorship bumper appearing during a "throwback" SmackDown in May 2021.

== See also ==
- XFL (2001), a similarly short-lived effort by McMahon to establish an American football league with sports entertainment features.
