= 1985 Mr. Olympia =

Professional bodybuilding competition

The 1985 Mr. Olympia contest was an IFBB professional bodybuilding competition held on October 26, 1985, at the Forest National Theatre in Brussels, Belgium.

== Results ==
Total prize money awarded was $100,000.

Place	Prize	Name
1	$50,000	(United States) Lee Haney
2	$20,000	(Barbados) Albert Beckles
3	$10,000	(United States) Rich Gaspari
4	$6,000	(Egypt) Mohamed Makkawy
5	$4,000	(United States) Mike Christian
6	$3,000	(Netherlands) Berry de Mey
7		(United States) Tom Platz
8		(Cuba) Sergio Oliva
9		(United States) Bob Paris
10		(United Kingdom) Frank Richard
11		(United States) Bob Birdsong
12		(United States) Tony Pearson
13		(United Kingdom) Wilfried Sylvester
14		(United States) John Brown
15		(France) Jacques Neuville
16		(United States) Danny Padilla
17		(Lebanon) Ali Malla
18		(United Kingdom) Johnny Fuller
19		(France) Gerard Buinoud
20		(Spain) Salvador Ruiz
21		(Netherlands) Appie Steenbeek
22		(Italy) Renato Bertagna
23		(United States) Sean Jenkins
24		(Netherlands) Ben Herder

== Notable events ==
- Lee Haney won his second consecutive Mr. Olympia title
