= 1991 Mr. Olympia =

Bodybuilding competition held in Orlando, Florida

The 1991 Mr. Olympia contest was an IFBB professional bodybuilding competition held in September 14, 1991 at the Walt Disney World Dolphin Hotel in Orlando, Florida. The score was tied after prejudging between Dorian Yates, in his Olympia debut, and defending champ Lee Haney. Haney went on to win the contest by three points. It was Haney's eighth Mr. Olympia win, at the time setting the record for most Mr. Olympia wins until Ronnie Coleman tied his record in 2005. Haney retired afterwards at 31.

== Results ==
The total prize money awarded was $250,000.

Place	Prize	Name
1	$100,000	(United States) Lee Haney
2	$50,000	(United Kingdom) Dorian Yates
3	$30,000	(United States) Vince Taylor
4	$25,000	(United States) Lee Labrada
5	$15,000	(United States) Shawn Ray
6	$12,000	(Australia) Sonny Schmidt
7	$8,000	(France) Francis Benfatto
8	$7,000	(France) Thierry Pastel
9	$6,000	(Germany) Achim Albrecht
10	$5,000	(United States) Rich Gaspari
11		(United States) Ron Love
12		(United States) Bob Paris
13		(United States) Robby Robinson
14		(United States) Renel Janvier
15		(Canada) Nimrod King
16		(Lebanon) Samir Bannout
16		(Barbados) Albert Beckles
16		(Norway) Geir Borgan Paulsen
16		(United States) Joseph Dawson
16		(Germany) Frank Hillebrand
16		(Czech Republic) Pavol Jablonický
16		(United States) J.J. Marsh
16		(United States) Mike Matarazzo
16		(Austria) Andreas Münzer
16		(Socialist Federal Republic of Yugoslavia) Miloš Šarčev
16		(United States) Tom Terwilliger

== Notable events ==
- Lee Haney won his eighth and final Mr. Olympia title, announces his retirement
