= 1987 Mr. Olympia =

Professional bodybuilding competition

The 1987 Mr. Olympia contest was an IFBB professional bodybuilding competition held on October 31, 1987, at the Scandinavium in Gothenburg, Sweden.

== Results ==
Total prize money awarded was $120,000.

Place	Prize	Name
1	$55,000	(United States) Lee Haney
2	$25,000	(United States) Rich Gaspari
3	$13,000	(United States) Lee Labrada
4	$9,000	(United States) Mike Christian
5	$6,000	(United States) Robby Robinson
6	$4,000	(Netherlands) Berry de Mey
7		(Barbados) Albert Beckles
8		(Lebanon) Edward Kawak
9		(United States) Ron Love
10		(United States) Michael Ashley
11		(United States) John Hnatyschak
12		(United Kingdom) Bertil Fox
13		(Germany) Peter Hensel
14		(France) Paul Jean-Guillaume
15		(Germany) Josef Grolmus
16		(Sweden) Ulf Larsson
17		(Germany) Herman Hoffend
18		(Canada) Steve Brisbois

== Notable events ==
- Lee Haney won his fourth consecutive Mr. Olympia title
