= Rich Gaspari =

Retired professional bodybuilder

Richard Gaspari
- Professional bodybuilder

Personal info
- Nickname: The Itch; The Dragon Slayer; Rich Gaspari
- Born: 16 May 1963 (age 63); New Brunswick, New Jersey, United States

Best statistics

Professional (Pro) career
- Pro-debut: 1985 IFBB Night of Champions; 1985
- Best win: IFBB Mr. Olympia Runner-up, three times; 1986, 1987, 1988
- Active: 1985–1996

Richard Gaspari (born May 16, 1963) is an American retired professional bodybuilder, and a former member of the IFBB. He came in second place at the 1986, 1987, and 1988 Mr. Olympia competitions.

== Early life and education ==
Gaspari grew up in Edison, New Jersey; as a teenager he would sneak into the Rutgers University weight room to take advantage of the exercise equipment.

A 1981 graduate of Edison High School, Gaspari was inducted into the school's Hall of Honor in 1985 alongside actress Susan Sarandon.

== Career ==
He became a professional bodybuilder in 1984, entered the 1985 IFBB Night of Champions and placed 2nd, then placed 3rd in his first Mr. Olympia that same year. Gaspari was a three-time runner-up at the Mr. Olympia contest (the most important in the professional circuit) during the long reign of Lee Haney at the top. He also won several secondary IFBB Grand Prix competitions during the same period. He won the inaugural Arnold Classic in 1989, becoming the first-ever champion of that competition. He was particularly praised for his hitherto-unseen level of conditioning and definition, being the first athlete to exhibit striations on the gluteal muscles.

Gaspari was inducted into the IFBB Hall of Fame in 2004. In 2011, he received the Muscle Beach Hall of Fame Award. He was featured on the cover of the October 2011 issue of Iron Man, 23 years after he last appeared on the cover of the magazine. In 2013 he was presented with the Arnold Classic Lifetime Achievement Award.

In 1997, Gaspari founded Gaspari Nutrition, a bodybuilding supplement company. The company filed for Chapter 11 bankruptcy protection in 2014 and, as part of a court-approved Section 363 sale, transferred substantially all of its assets to Allegro Nutrition on December 5, 2014. The sale allowed the company to continue operations as a going concern, preserving most employee positions and maintaining its brand presence.

In 2016, Jared Wheat, owner of Hi-Tech Pharmaceuticals, acquired co-ownership of Gaspari Nutrition and integrated its operations with Hi-Tech's manufacturing and supply chain capabilities.

In August 2018, Gaspari regained full control by buying out Wheat’s stake and consolidating ownership under Gaspari Nutra LLC. Under this new structure, the company continued to distribute its legacy products and pursue expansion through innovation and investment.

Gaspari resides in Jackson Township, New Jersey.

== Competition history ==
- 1983 NPC Junior Nationals Overall Winner
- 1983 NPC Junior Nationals Heavyweight, 1st
- 1983 NPC Nationals Heavyweight, 5th
- 1984 NPC Nationals Light-Heavyweight, 1st
- 1984 World IFBB Amateur Championships Light-Heavyweight, 1st
- 1985 IFBB Night of Champions 2nd
- 1985 IFBB Mr. Olympia 3rd
- 1986 IFBB Los Angeles Pro Championships Winner
- 1986 IFBB Mr. Olympia 2nd
- 1986 IFBB World Pro Championships Winner
- 1987 IFBB Grand Prix France Winner
- 1987 IFBB Grand Prix Germany 2nd
- 1987 IFBB Grand Prix Germany (2) Winner
- 1987 IFBB Mr. Olympia 2nd
- 1988 IFBB Grand Prix England 2nd
- 1988 IFBB Grand Prix France Winner
- 1988 IFBB Grand Prix Germany Winner
- 1988 IFBB Grand Prix Greece 2nd
- 1988 IFBB Grand Prix Italy Winner
- 1988 IFBB Grand Prix Spain (2) 2nd
- 1988 IFBB Grand Prix Spain Winner
- 1988 IFBB Mr. Olympia 2nd
- 1989 IFBB Arnold Classic Winner
- 1989 IFBB Mr. Olympia 4th
- 1990 IFBB Mr. Olympia 5th
- 1991 IFBB Arnold Classic 7th
- 1991 IFBB Mr. Olympia 10th
- 1992 IFBB Arnold Classic 13th
- 1994 IFBB Chicago Pro Invitational 16th
- 1994 IFBB Niagara Falls Pro Invitational 15th
- 1994 IFBB Night of Champions – did not place
- 1995 IFBB Canada Pro Cup 5th
- 1995 IFBB Night of Champions 12th
- 1996 IFBB Canada Pro Cup 11th
- 1996 IFBB Florida Pro Invitational 12th
- 1996 IFBB San Jose Pro Invitational 16th
