= 1982 Mr. Olympia =

Professional bodybuilding competition in London

The 1982 Mr. Olympia contest was an IFBB professional bodybuilding competition held in October 1982 at the Wembley Conference Centre in London, England.

== Results ==
Total prize money awarded was $25,000.

Place	Prize	Name
1	$25,000	(United States) Chris Dickerson
2		(United States) Frank Zane
3		(United States) Casey Viator
4		(Lebanon) Samir Bannout
5		(Barbados) Albert Beckles
6		(United States) Tom Platz
7		(Egypt) Mohamed Makkawy
8		(United Kingdom) Bertil Fox
9		(United Kingdom) Jonny Fuller
10		(Germany) Jusup Wilkosz
11		(United States) Boyer Coe
12		(United States) Danny Padilla
13		(France) Jacques Neuville
14		(United States) Dennis Tinerino
15		(United States) Lance Dreher
16		(Australia) Roger Walker

== Notable events ==
- Chris Dickerson became the first openly gay and oldest competitor up to that time to win the Mr. Olympia title at 43 years old.
- Franco Columbu, the 1981 champion did not compete.
- Tom Platz, who was favored, tore his right biceps 6 weeks prior to the competition.
- Chris Dickerson on stage would announce his retirement; however, he would return to the stage and competed in the 1984 Mr Olympia placing eleventh.
