= Tony Pearson (bodybuilder) =

American bodybuilder (born 1957)

- Professional bodybuilder
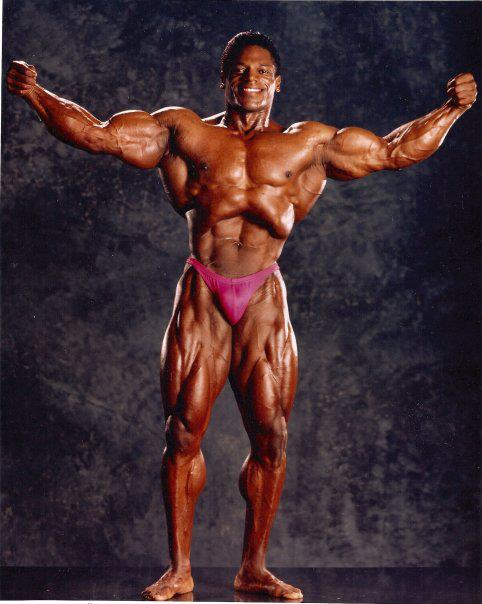
- Pearson in 1984

Personal info
- Nickname: " The Michael Jackson of Body Building "
- Born: January 11, 1957 (age 69); Memphis, Tennessee, U.S.

Best statistics
- Height: 5 ft 8 in (1.73 m)
- Weight: 205 lb (93 kg)

Professional (Pro) career
- Pro-debut: WBBG Mr. World; 1979
- Best win: NABBA Pro. Mr. Universe; 1980
- Predecessor: Bertil Fox
- Successor: Robby Robinson
- Active: Retired 1994

Tony Pearson (born January 11, 1957) is an American bodybuilding champion. His bodybuilding championships include individual and couples competitions.

== Biography ==
=== Early years ===
Tony Pearson was born the second youngest of eight children (five girls and three boys). His mother, Daisy Pearson, was a stay at home mom and his father, Sam Pearson, worked as an ice and coal delivery man. Pearson grew up during the civil rights era of the early 1960s in Memphis, Tennessee. In 1959, at age two, Tony's parents divorced, at which time he was taken to an aunt to raise him. This family member was in her later years and financially and emotionally unable to care for a young child. In 1970 they moved to St. Louis, Missouri where he attended Normandy Junior and Normandy High School. In 1973, after years of abuse and neglect, the intervention of his high school counselor and the State of Missouri took custody of Tony from his aunt and placed him into a group home.

==== Tony discovers bodybuilding ====
As a member of his school's wrestling team, Tony suffered a knee injury, at which time he started weight training as a way to rehabilitate his knee. Surprised at how quickly his body responded to lifting weights, Tony decided he wanted to become a bodybuilder. Seeing his interest and talent, his coach took him to a "real gym," George Turner's gym in Clayton, MO. This gym was the home to some of the professional bodybuilding elite of the time. Ken Waller, Dave Johns, and Samir Bannout were all connected to Turner's gym. After the first day of training, the owner of the gym, George Turner, said to the young Pearson, "You've got potential kid. I'm going to train you. I think I can make you a champion." Over the next few months he packed on twenty pounds of muscle and six months later Tony told his trainer that he was leaving. In 1976, at the age of nineteen, Pearson moved to California to fulfill his dream of becoming a professional bodybuilder. After arriving in Los Angeles he was homeless for a period of time. After getting on his feet, the young Pearson ventured to the "Mecca of bodybuilding", Gold's Gym in Venice, California. It was there that he was introduced to all of the great bodybuilding legends of the time, just weeks before the 1976 Mr. Olympia competition.

==== Tony and Arnold ====
Later that year (1976) Tony was training on Venice Beach, where he was discovered by Arnold Schwarzenegger on Muscle Beach, who became his mentor. Pearson won his first contest, the 1976 Mr. Venice Beach, and Arnold featured him in the first edition of his book, The Encyclopedia of Modern Bodybuilding Co-Written by Bill Dobbins. Of the young Pearson, Schwarzenegger wrote, "I remember a few years ago seeing a skinny black kid training at the weight pit on Venice Beach. I watched him doing endless sets of squats, with very heavy weight, torturing himself with rep after rep. After a while, his thighs began to grow and soon they were huge, separated and beautifully defined, and only a year and half later he entered and won the 1978 Mr. America contest."

=== Individual competition ===
Tony Pearson known for his symmetrical lines and razor sharp definition. Pearson's stage name was "Michael Jackson of Bodybuilding" due to his similar facial appearance to the entertainer. His career began to take off as he worked his way through the amateur competitive ranks. In 1977 winning the Amateur Athletic Union's (AAU) Mr. Los Angeles (Junior), and the 1978 Mr. Los Angeles (Los Angeles, CA), Jr. Mr. USA, (Sacramento, CA), Jr. Mr. America, (Austin, TX), Mr. California (short), (Sacramento, CA), and (AAU) Mr. America, (Cincinnati, OH). At the age of twenty one, Pearson was the second youngest to win Mr. America (the youngest was Casey Viator at the age of nineteen), (Preceded: Dave Johns 1977), (Succeeded: Ray Mentzer 1979). Other bodybuilding competitions won during his twenty-year career include the 1979 World Bodybuilding Guild (WBBG) Professional (the official start of his professional bodybuilding career), Mr. World, ( New York, NY ), (Preceded: Anibal Lopez 1978), ( Succeeded: Anibal Lopez 1980), and the WBBG Olympus Mr. Olympus Pro, (Preceded: Sergio Oliva 1978), 1979 World Amateur Bodybuilding Association, (WABBA) World Championships, (Verona, Italy), the 1980 National Amateur Bodybuilders Association (NABBA) Pro Mr. Universe., (London, England), (Preceded: 1979 Bertil Fox), (Succeeded: 1981 Robby Robinson), 1983 International Federation of Bodybuilding (IFBB) Pro Denver Grand Prix Winner, (Denver, CO). Pearson also competed in the (IFBB) Mr. Olympia in 1984 (New York, NY) and a second time in 1985 (Brussels, Belgium) placing 12th in both competitions.

=== Couples competition ===
Pearson was first introduced to couples posing in 1979 when he made a guest appearance with the "First Lady of Bodybuilding", Lisa Lyon, at the Mr. Los Angeles Competition. This was the first time a male bodybuilder and a female bodybuilder performed on stage together. Pearson and Lyon were pioneers in this new category of Mixed Pairs. In 1980, Chris Dickerson and Stacy Bentley won the first International Federation of Body Building (IFBB) Professional World Mixed-Pair Competition. In 1981, Dickerson won again with Lynn Conkwright. In an unprecedented winning streak, Pearson won six International Federation of Body Building (IFBB) Professional World Mixed-Pair titles with four different partners in 1982 and '83 (Shelley Gruwell), '84 (Carla Dunlap), '85 (Tina Plakinger), '86 (Juliette Bergmann), and '88 (Carla Dunlap).

In 2010, at the age of fifty-three, Pearson returned to the stage guest posing with his former Mixed Pairs partner 2001 Ms. Olympia Juliette Bergmann at the 2010 "Juliette Bergmann Bodybuilding Classic" in the Netherlands, and also made a guest appearance at the FIBO Power 2011 in Germany. In 2014 at the age of fifty-seven, Tony returned to competitive competition winning the Men's open (short) and the Grandmaster's over 50 class at the NABBA USA American Championship's, also capturing the Joe Meeko Memorial Men's best poser award.

=== Other competitions ===
In 1991 and 1992, Pearson competed in World Bodybuilding Federation WBF shows launched by professional wrestling mogul Vince McMahon. A group of thirteen professional bodybuilders were named (WBF Body Stars). Pearson's stage name was dubbed "The Jetman". In 1993 Pearson promoted a supplement line (ICOPRO), Integrated Conditioning Program, developed by Dr. Frederick Hatfield (also known as "Dr. Squat") for Vince McMahon.

=== Honors and awards ===
In 2007, Pearson was inducted into the "Muscle Beach Bodybuilding Hall of Fame" in Venice Beach, CA. Other professional bodybuilders to receive this honor include Arnold Schwarzenegger, Frank Zane, and Joe Weider.

=== Media appearances ===
Tony has appeared on: Man from Atlantis: "The Disappearances" television movie (minions) MGM, 1977, Good Morning America Show 1978, The Merv Griffin Show 1979, Rose Parade, Pasadena, CA, 1979, ABC Wide World of Sports, 1983, 1984, NBC Sportsworld, 1983, 1985, 1986, Soul Train (Health and Fitness Segment), 1987, La ultima Cena……Del, TV Comedy Show Special, 1988, (himself), Empty Nest, Gesundheit (role: stud with suds,) 1994, WBF BodyStars, (TV Show) USA Network, 1991 (himself), Bodybuilders on "Card Sharks" game show, 1987 (himself) CBS, WWF/WBF BodyStar Wars Challenger, 1991 (himself) "Tug of War" between the WBF and WWF Stars. Flex Magazine Workout (co-hosted by Shawn Ray), (TV Show), ESPN 1993

Tony has been featured in the fitness and lifestyle magazines: Sports Illustrated, Ebony Magazine, Muscle & Fitness, Iron Man, Muscle Mag International, Flex Magazine September 22, 2019, Pearson published his memoir 'Driven' - My Secret Untold Story - Based on a True Story. In March 2021, Pearson published his Audiobook - 'Driven'. On March 14, 2022 Pearson published a children's book -'The Story Of Baby Herc'. The single,'Driven', was released in August 2024 and can be found on Spotify, Apple Music, and YouTube Music.

On Aug. 25, 2023, Variety Magazine announced that Generation Iron and The Vladar Company had acquired distribution rights for Driven: The Tony Pearson Story, a feature documentary detailing Pearson's life and career. Produced by Tequila Mockingbird Productions, the film won the Grand Prize for Best Documentary Feature at the 2023 Golden State Film Festival. The documentary is set to premiere in English-speaking territories on Apple, Amazon, Google Play and VUDU on Oct. 6, 2023.

== Stats ==
- Height: 5 ft 8 in
- Weight: 200–205 lbs
- Arms: 20 inches
- Waist: 29

Pearson have the best stomach Vacuum pose, because he was able to display it in multiple poses. Also was known to have the best shoulder to Waist ratio in bodybuilding.

== Competition history ==
Year	Competition	Category/Class	Result
* 1976	AAU Gold's Classic	Teen	overall winner
* 1976	AAU Gold's Classic	Teen, Short	1st
1977	AAU Junior Mr. USA	Short	3rd
* 1977	AAU Mr. Los Angeles	Junior	1st
* 1977	AAU Mr. Southern California	Junior	1st
* 1978	AAU Mr. America		overall winner
* 1978	AAU Mr. America	Medium	1st
* 1978	AAU Mr. California	Short	1st
* 1978	AAU Junior Mr. America	Medium	1st
* 1978	AAU Junior Mr. America		overall winner
* 1978	AAU Junior Mr. USA		overall winner
* 1978	AAU Junior Mr. USA	Medium	1st
* 1979	WBBG Olympus		winner
1979	NABBA Mr. Universe	Medium	2nd
* 1979	WBBG Pro. Mr. World		winner
* 1979	WABBA World Championships	Medium	1st
* 1979	WABBA World Championships		overall winner
* 1980	NABBA Universe Pro.		winner
1980	WABBA World Championships	Professional	3rd
1980	WABBA Pro. World Cup		5th
1981	IFBB Canada Pro. Cup		4th
1981	IFBB Grand Prix Belgium		6th
1981	IFBB Grand Prix Wales		5th
1981	IFBB Universe Pro.		3rd
1981	WABBA Pro. World Cup		7th
1981	IFBB World Grand Prix		4th
1981	IFBB World Pro. Championships		3rd
1982	IFBB Night of Champions		6th
1982	IFBB World Pro. Championships		6th
*1983	IFBB Grand Prix Denver		winner
1983	IFBB Grand Prix England		4th
1983	IFBB Grand Prix Las Vegas		6th
1983	IFBB Grand Prix Portland		2nd
1983	IFBB Grand Prix Sweden		6th
1983	IFBB Grand Prix Switzerland		6th
1983	IFBB World Pro. Championships		8th
1984	Canada Pro. Cup		3rd
1984	IFBB Olympia		12th
1984	IFBB World Grand Prix		3rd
1985	IFBB Night of Champions		9th
1985	IFBB Olympia		12th
1986	IFBB Los Angeles Pro. Championships		5th
1986	IFBB Night of Champions		4th
1986	IFBB World Pro. Championships		9th
1987	IFBB Night of Champions		did not place
1987	IFBB World Pro. Championships		8th
1988	IFBB Grand Prix US Pro.		6th
1988	IFBB Niagara Falls Pro. Invitational		5th
1988	IFBB Night of Champions		8th
1988	IFBB World Pro. Championships		8th
1989	IFBB Grand Prix France		11th
1989	IFBB Grand Prix Germany		9th
1989	IFBB Grand Prix Spain		9th
1989	IFBB Grand Prix Spain (2)		9th
1989	IFBB Grand Prix Sweden		11th
1990	IFBB Arnold Classic		6th
1990	IFBB Houston Pro. Invitational		6th
1990	IFBB Ironman Pro. Invitational		8th
1991	WBF Grand Prix		11th
1993	IFBB Chicago Pro. Invitational		13th
1993	IFBB Night of Champions		did not place
1993	IFBB Pittsburgh Pro. Invitational		16th
1994	IFBB Ironman Pro. Invitational		14th
1994	IFBB San Jose Pro. Invitational		16th
2014	NABBA USA American Open (short)		1st
2014	NABBA USA American Grandmaster's		1st
2020	AAU Mr. Universe Master's		1st

== See also ==
- List of male professional bodybuilders
- List of female professional bodybuilders
