= 1979 Mr. Olympia =

Bodybuilding competition

The 1979 Mr. Olympia contest was an IFBB professional bodybuilding competition held October 6, 1979 at Veterans Memorial Auditorium in Columbus, Ohio.

== Results ==
The total prize money awarded was $50,000.

=== Over 200lbs ===
Place	Name
1	(United States) Mike Mentzer
2	(United States) Dennis Tinerino
3	(Australia) Roger Walker
4	(Barbados) Roy Callender
5	(United States) Bob Birdsong

=== Under 200lbs ===
Place	Name
1	(United States) Frank Zane
2	(United States) Boyer Coe
3	(United States) Robby Robinson
4	(United States) Chris Dickerson
5	(United States) Danny Padilla
6	(United States) Carlos Rodriguez
7	(Barbados) Albert Beckles
8	(United States) Tom Platz
9	(United States) Ed Corney
10	(United States) Steve Davis

=== Overall winner ===
Place	Prize	Name
1	$25,000	(United States) Frank Zane
2		(United States) Mike Mentzer

== Notable events ==
- Frank Zane won his third consecutive Mr. Olympia title
- This was the last year the Mr. Olympia contest used weight divisions to determine an overall winner
