= 1990 Mr. Olympia =

Bodybuilding competition

The 1990 Mr. Olympia contest was an IFBB professional bodybuilding competition held on September 15, 1990, at the Arie Crown Theater in Chicago, Illinois.

== Results ==
The total prize money awarded reached $200,000 for the first time ever.

Place	Prize	Name
1	$100,000	(United States) Lee Haney
2	$31,500	(United States) Lee Labrada
3	$18,500	(United States) Shawn Ray
4	$12,500	(United States) Mike Christian
5	$10,000	(United States) Rich Gaspari
6	$8,000	(France) Francis Benfatto
7		(Germany) Frank Hillebrand
8		(Lebanon) Samir Bannout
9		(Austria) Andreas Münzer
10		(United States) Eddie Robinson
11		(United States) Mike Quinn
12		(United States) Ron Love
13		(Switzerland) Jean-Luc Favre
14		(Barbados) Bernard Sealy

== Notable events ==
- Lee Haney won his seventh consecutive Mr. Olympia title
- This was the first edition of Mr. Olympia to employ drug tests. Amid criticism by spectators for lowering the quality of the event, the IFBB reversed its decision the following year.
- World Wrestling Federation (WWF) owner Vince McMahon and bodybuilder Tom Platz bought a booth at the competition as representatives of a new magazine known as Bodybuilding Lifestyles. However, when Platz appeared on-stage as its representative during the closing ceremonies, he announced the formation of the World Bodybuilding Federation—a short-lived competitor to the IFBB backed by WWF parent company Titan Sports.
