= Iron Man (magazine) =

American magazine for bodybuilding, weightlifting and powerlifting

- Categories: Fitness
- Frequency: Monthly
- Founder: Peary Rader and Mabel Rader
- Founded: 1936
- Company: Iron Man Publishing
- Country: United States
- Based in: Oxnard, California
- Language: English
- ISSN: 0047-1496

Iron Man is an American publication which discusses bodybuilding, weightlifting and powerlifting. It was founded in 1936 by two Alliance, Nebraska natives, Peary Rader and his wife, Mabel Rader.

== History ==
The magazine's first print run of fifty copies was done via a duplicating machine which sat on their dining room table. The first issue was titled Super Physique. Iron Man started out as an educational vehicle to inform and enlighten those people who were interested in weightlifting, bodybuilding and eventually, powerlifting. The magazine is published in Oxnard, California and printed in Kentucky.

The focus of Iron Man Magazine during its first fifty years was on all three sports, with emphasis on weight training in general as a life-enhancing activity. Iron Man at one time stressed the health and character building aspects of weight training, though it later shifted its focus to hardcore bodybuilding.

In the early 1950s, Iron Man Magazine was the first weight-training publication to show women working out with weights as part of their overall fitness regimen. It even went so far as to show a pregnant woman training with weights and educating readers on the benefits of exercise during pregnancy; thoroughly modern concepts decades ahead of their time. In the late 1950s to early 1960s, Iron Man was the first to talk about high-quality proteins derived from milk and eggs as well as liquid amino acids. By this time, the bimonthly magazine had acquired over 30,000 subscribers simply on the strength of its information. The Raders never worked at expanding its circulation. It grew by word of mouth; fueled by Iron Man's ability to provide reliable information.

By 1970, Arthur Jones had created the first Nautilus prototype. He was eager to share his exercise concepts with the world, but every magazine except Iron Man turned him down. Peary Rader saw the potential of the Nautilus concept and in keeping with Iron Man's goal to remain an open forum for ideas, Rader embraced Jones' enthusiasm and ideas. Iron Man was the leader in bringing Nautilus to the marketplace and the only publication to stand behind it. The entire exercise machine industry today was built on the shoulders of the Nautilus.

By the early 1980s, the Raders (now in their seventies) had spent nearly fifty years working long hours to put out a bimonthly publication. In 1986, the Raders sold the magazine to John Balik, who repositioned the magazine as a hardcore bodybuilding publication. Iron Man Magazine has featured covers with athletes from both hardcore and natural bodybuilding including: Arnold Schwarzenegger, Jay Cutler, Sebastian Siegel, Michael O'Hearn, Bob Paris, Scott Steiner in 2000,Lee Haney and Lee Labrada. It's also famous for publishing numerous swimsuit issues.

In 1993 the editorial offices of Iron Man magazine moved to Oxnard, California.

In 2015 Swedish bodybuilder and entrepreneur Binais Begovic and his spouse, plastic surgeon Catherine Begovic, purchased Iron Man. They stated their intention to turn the magazine into a source for "credible information" about health and fitness and "a platform to launch new athletes into their fitness careers". The magazine's content abruptly shifted from bodybuilding and training to a focus on the Physique and Bikini classes and competitors of fitness competitions.

In 2018 the magazine changed owners again, purchased by Denny Kakos, founder of the International Natural Bodybuilding Association. Iron Man's long-time slogan of "Inspiration, Information, Transformation" was replaced with the phrase "Natural Bodybuilding, Nutrition, Fitness and Health," and the magazine went from a monthly to a quarterly (seasonal) publication schedule.
