= Andreas Münzer =

Austrian bodybuilder (1964–1996)

Andreas Münzer (October 25, 1964 – March 14, 1996) was an Austrian professional bodybuilder known for his extremely low body fat levels and early death. He was featured in Flex twice and Muscle Magazine International once.

== Biography ==
Münzer admired fellow Austrian bodybuilder Arnold Schwarzenegger. He attempted to imitate Schwarzenegger, eventually meeting his hero at the Arnold Classic competition in 1996. While competing, he used a variety of ergogenic aids, such as anabolic steroids, including large amounts of potassium-sparing diuretics, possibly leading to his death in 1996.

== Death ==
After months of stomach pain, Münzer was admitted to a hospital on the morning of March 12, 1996. By 7pm, doctors had decided to operate to stop bleeding from his stomach, but his liver and kidneys failed shortly afterwards. His condition by this point was too severe for a blood transfusion, and he died on the morning of March 14. The autopsy gave the cause of death as dystrophic multiple organ failure.

Some of the specific autopsy findings were an extremely muscular physique with an almost complete absence of subcutaneous fat, a liver that contained numerous table tennis ball-sized tumors (with half the liver consisting simply of a crumbly mass that was similar to polystyrene), shriveled testicles, and cardiac hypertrophy (Münzer's heart weighed 636g; a normal man's heart usually weighs 300–350g).

Münzer's electrolytes were also out of balance, and his potassium levels were extremely high. Traces of about 20 different drugs were found, along with acute toxicity (perhaps caused by a stimulant). Schwarzenegger sent a wreath to Münzer's funeral in Styria, with the message: "A last greeting to a friend."

== Competitive blank stats ==
- Weight: 259 lbs (117 kg)
- Arms: 21 inch (53 cm)
- Chest: 58 inch (147 cm)
- Height 69 inch (175 cm)

== Competition history ==
- 1986 European Amateur Championships (MiddleWeight) - 6th
- 1987 World Amateur Championships (Light-HeavyWeight) - 3rd
- 1988 World Amateur Championships (Light-HeavyWeight) - 3rd
- 1989 Mr. Olympia - 13th
- 1989 World Games (HeavyWeight) - 1st
- 1990 Arnold Classic - 3rd
- 1990 Grand Prix Germany - 3rd
- 1990 Mr. Olympia - 9th
- 1991 Arnold Classic - 9th
- 1991 Ironman Pro Invitational - 3rd
- 1991 Mr. Olympia - 16th
- 1991 Pittsburgh Pro Invitational - 4th
- 1993 Arnold Classic - 7th
- 1993 Grand Prix Germany (2) - 2nd
- 1993 Grand Prix Germany - 4th
- 1993 Night of Champions - 2nd
- 1993 Mr. Olympia - 9th
- 1994 Arnold Classic - 5th
- 1994 Grand Prix France - 8th
- 1994 Grand Prix Germany (2) - 5th
- 1994 Mr. Olympia - 9th
- 1995 Arnold Classic - 4th
- 1996 Arnold Classic - 6th
- 1996 San Jose Pro Invitational - 7th

== See also ==
- List of male professional bodybuilders
- List of female professional bodybuilders
