= Samir Bannout =

Lebanese bodybuilder (born 1955)

- Professional bodybuilder
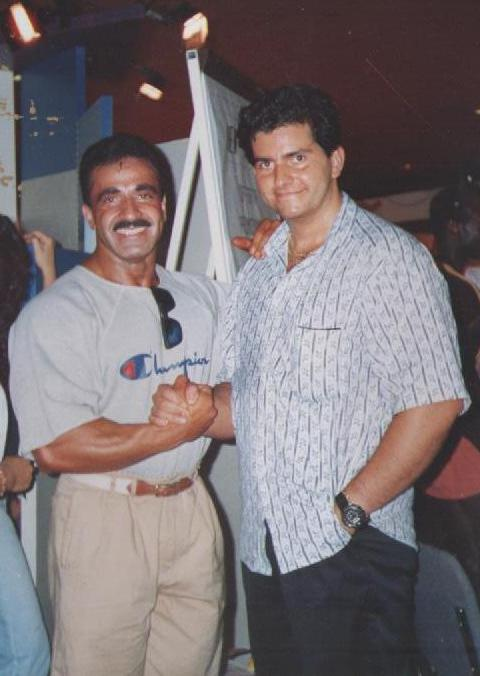
- Bannout (left) with Paolo Tassetto

Personal info
- Nickname: The Lion of Lebanon
- Born: November 7, 1955 (age 70); Beirut, Lebanon

Best statistics
- Height: 5 ft 7 in (1.70 m)
- Weight: contest: 205 lb (93 kg) off-season: 215 lb (98 kg)

Professional (Pro) career
- Pro-debut: Mr. Universe; 1974
- Best win: IFBB Mr. Olympia; 1983
- Predecessor: Chris Dickerson
- Successor: Lee Haney
- Active: 1974–1996

Samir Bannout (Arabic: سمير بنّوت) (born November 7, 1955) is a Lebanese former professional bodybuilder and commentator. Nicknamed 'The Lion of Lebanon', he won the 1983 Mr. Olympia, defeating Mohamed Makkawy and Lee Haney. He is the first Middle Eastern bodybuilder to win a Mr. Olympia title.

Bannout is considered by most as the last of the champions from the golden era of bodybuilding, where the emphasis was on shape and balance rather than mass. Known for his balanced and aesthetic physique, definition, leg development, and back, he is most famous for his well-developed lower back and introducing his signature "Lebanon cedar". He is considered to have had one of the best backs of his era.

Since retirement, Bannout has taken up the role of a commentator surrounding the sport. In 2002, he was inducted into the IFBB Hall of Fame.

== Biography ==
Known as "the Lion of Lebanon", Samir Bannout won the Mr. Olympia title in 1983. Bannout has appeared on the covers of many fitness and bodybuilding publications, including Strength and Health, MuscleMag International, Muscle Digest, Flex, Muscle Training Illustrated, Muscle and Fitness, Muscle Up, IronMan and Muscular Development magazines.

Samir Bannout left his native Lebanon and immigrated to America, where he first moved to Detroit, Michigan.

He began competing at the amateur level, where he rose up the ranks and eventually achieved IFBB pro status by winning his light-heavyweight class at the 1979 IFBB World Amateur Championships. By this time, Samir had already relocated to Santa Monica, California. Bannout took fourth place at the 1982 Mr. Olympia contest and returned the following year to take home the title in 1983, winning the contest to become Mr. Olympia 1983. The contest was held in Munich, Germany that year, and the trophy awarded to him is called a "Sandow" for Eugen Sandow. Bannout weighed 188 pounds (85 kg) for his win at the contest, making him the last Mr. Olympia to weigh under 200 pounds (91 kg). His victory ended what is referred to as the "lightweight" or "aesthetics" era for the Mr. Olympia contest, which had originally started with American Frank Zane winning the title in 1977 and reverted to emphasizing increased mass and size starting with American Lee Haney winning in 1984 for the first time and following up his inaugural victory with seven additional consecutive wins for a record grand total of eight titles.

Bannout is regarded by many as having one of the greatest backs in bodybuilding history. The extreme muscular definition that he achieved in his lower back region portrayed the shape of a "Lebanese Cedar" or "Christmas Tree" when posing on stage.

After placing sixth at the 1984 Olympia, the IFBB suspended him for three years as punishment for his participation at the World Championship competition of a rival federation, the WABBA.

Samir Bannout did not get a top-six placing another time at a Mr. Olympia contest, despite competing at the event many more times. In 1990, he won his second IFBB pro show, the IFBB Pittsburgh Pro Invitational. His professional career lasted 17 years.

Bannout has been open about his past use of anabolic steroids: "I have to be quite truthful with you, I have used anabolics. I'm not going to have to deny it, because all the other Mr. Olympia contenders, I feel that they are using it, and I only use it to reverse catabolic effect." Bannout openly criticizes the IFBB during the years he competed, in that he felt that he had been "robbed" of winning in other events and that there were significant political undertones to selection of winners at the Mr. Olympia.

Today, Bannout lives in Los Angeles, California, with his wife, Randa, and his three children, Lea, Jesse, Sergio. He was inducted to the IFBB Hall of Fame in 2002. He was previously married to the sister of fellow IFBB professional Lee Labrada, Lourdes; they had two daughters.

== Bodybuilding History ==
- 1974 Mr. Universe, Medium Class 7th (Youngest contestant)
- 1976 Mr. Universe, Middleweight 12th
- 1977 Mr. International, Middleweight 2nd
- 1978 Mr. International, Middleweight 2nd
- 1979 Best in the World, Amateur 1st
- 1979 Canada Pro Cup, N/A
- 1979 World Amateur Championships, Light Heavyweight 1st
- 1980 Grand Prix California 4th
- 1980 Grand Prix Pennsylvania 7th
- 1980 Night of Champions 10th
- 1980 Mr. Olympia 15th
- 1980 Pittsburgh Pro Invitational N/A
- 1981 Grand Prix California 7th
- 1981 Grand Prix New England 6th
- 1981 Night of Champions 10th
- 1981 Mr. Olympia 9th
- 1982 Grand Prix Sweden 2nd
- 1982 Mr. Olympia 4th
- 1983 Mr. Olympia 1st
- 1984 Canada Pro Cup 5th
- 1984 Mr. Olympia 6th
- 1984 World Grand Prix 5th
- 1985 WABBA World Championship 1st
- 1986 WABBA World Championship 1st
- 1988 Grand Prix England 10th
- 1988 Grand Prix Italy 9th
- 1988 Mr. Olympia 8th
- 1989 Arnold Schwarzenegger Classic 4th
- 1989 Grand Prix Finland 6th
- 1989 Grand Prix France 8th
- 1989 Grand Prix Germany 5th
- 1989 Grand Prix Holland 5th
- 1989 Grand Prix Spain 5th
- 1989 Grand Prix Spain (2nd) 5th
- 1989 Grand Prix Sweden 3rd
- 1989 Mr. Olympia 9th
- 1990 Arnold Schwarzenegger Classic 4th
- 1990 Grand Prix England 6th
- 1990 Grand Prix Finland 5th
- 1990 Grand Prix Italy 6th
- 1990 Houston Pro Invitational 2nd
- 1990 Mr. Olympia 8th
- 1990 Pittsburgh Pro Invitational 1st (Winner)
- 1990 NABBA World Championships Professional 2nd
- 1991 Mr. Olympia 16th
- 1992 Arnold Schwarzenegger Classic N/A
- 1992 Grand Prix Germany 11th
- 1992 Mr. Olympia 16th
- 1993 Arnold Schwarzenegger Classic 13th
- 1993 Ironman Pro Invitational 13th
- 1993 San Jose Pro Invitational 10th
- 1994 Grand Prix England 14th
- 1994 Grand Prix Germany 13th
- 1994 Grand Prix Italy 12th
- 1994 Grand Prix Spain 12th
- 1994 Mr. Olympia 19th
- 1996 Masters Mr. Olympia 6th
- 2011 IFBB Pro World Masters Bodybuilding 11th

== Distinctions ==
- The first Middle Eastern bodybuilder to win the Mr. Olympia.
- The only bodybuilder to defeat eight-time Mr. Olympia Lee Haney in a Mr. Olympia contest.
- The only bodybuilder to have won the Mr. Olympia as his first professional bodybuilding title.
- The last Mr. Olympia to weigh under 200 lbs.

== See also ==
- List of male professional bodybuilders
- List of female professional bodybuilders
- Mr. Olympia
- Arnold Classic

== Notes ==
- Roark, Joe (December 2002). "Factoids - History - Samir Bannout". Flex. 20 (10). Archived from the original on December 6, 2007 – via FindArticles.

Mr. Olympia
| Preceded by: Chris Dickerson | First (1983) | Succeeded by: Lee Haney |
