= Jubilee (musical) =

1935 musical comedy with a book by Moss Hart and music and lyrics by Cole Porter

- Original Broadway Poster
- Music: Cole Porter
- Lyrics: Cole Porter
- Book: Moss Hart
- Productions: 1935 Broadway; 1998 Carnegie Hall concert

Jubilee is a musical comedy with a book by Moss Hart and music and lyrics by Cole Porter. It premiered on Broadway in 1935 to rapturous reviews. Inspired by the recent Silver Jubilee of George V of Great Britain, the story is of the royal family of a fictional European country. Several of its songs, especially "Begin the Beguine" and "Just One of Those Things", became independently popular and have become part of the American Songbook.

The musical opened on Broadway in October 1935, in the midst of the Great Depression. It had strong reviews and was considered "one of the great theatrical events of the 1930s." It ran for 169 performances. Although the original arrangements were lost after 1948, beginning in 1986 the musical was reconstructed. It has been produced by several companies in New York, London and elsewhere.

== History ==
Cole Porter and Moss Hart took a four-and-a-half month "around the world" luxury cruise on the Franconia, with their families, friends, and assistants accompanying them. Their intention was to write a new musical on the trip, and songs and scenes were inspired by their ports of call. For example, the song "The Kling-Kling Bird on the Divi-Divi Tree" came about after a trip through a botanical garden in Jamaica. Playing off the recent celebrations in Britain for the Silver Jubilee of George V, they created a plot about a royal family, filled with characters based on their famous friends. For example, the swimmer who becomes an actor is a spoof of Johnny Weissmuller, playwright Noël Coward is portrayed as Eric Dare, and the party hostess Elsa Maxwell is portrayed as Eva Standing.

== Synopsis ==
Time: 1935

Place: In and Around London, England and Rockwell-On-Sea

=== Act I ===
When the curtain rises a ball is being hosted at the Royal Palace by the Royal Family ("Our Crown"). The King (Henry) and the Queen (Katherine) are sitting in the throne room, ignoring the guests, as the Prime Minister attempts to convince them to come to the Ball. The Queen is reading a movie magazine and suggests that the picture "Mowgli and the White Goddess", which features swimmer Charles Rausmiller as the scantily-clad Mowgli, be shown at the Jubilee. The King then suggests that he could perform his string trick and Prince James and the Princess (Diana) come in with their own requests. Prince James would like to have American Dancer Karen O'Kane come to the Jubilee, and the Princess would like songwriter/actor/playwright Eric Dare to receive Jubilee honors. The Prime Minister denies their requests and the Royal Family is finally summoned to the ball after the guests begin to steal ashtrays, and the tassels off the curtains. Meanwhile, the young Prince Peter and his cousin Prince Rudolph scheme to be able to visit Radio City Music Hall so while the Cabinet is meeting, they throw a rock through the window, with a message attached to it. It reads: "If the Royal Family is not out of the Palace by midnight, we will come and take them out. This is our first and last warning". The Prime Minister alerts the Royal Family that they will be evacuated to the dreary Feathermore Castle, but they decide "to Hell with Feathermore!" and that they will do something they've always wanted to do ("We're off to Feathermore"). The Princess decides to visit Eric Dare ("Why Shouldn't I?") who is currently being greeted by a crowd of admirers ("Entrance of Eric") after returning from exotic travels ("The Kling-Kling Bird on the Top of the Divi-Divi Tree"). The Princess requests an autograph from Eric, who becomes intrigued with Diana after she proves herself more thoughtful than the rest of his crowd of admirers ("When Love Comes Your Way"). Meanwhile, in a Municipal Park ("What a Nice Municipal Park"), the King is practicing his string trick, which is seen by socialite and party planner Eva Standing, who drags him off to be an attraction at her next party. The Queen, with the help of a man dressed as an ape, finds the theater where "Mowgli and the White Goddess" is playing ("When Me Mowgli Love") and meets Charles Rausmiller at the stage door, asking him to help her with her breaststroke, to which he agrees ("Gather Ye Autographs While Ye May"). At the Cafe Martinque, ("My Loulou"), Prince James is watching Karen O'Kane perform ("Begin the Beguine"). He meets her and together they win a cash prize for the best-danced Beguine. Meanwhile, the King has been staying at Eva's place preparing his party trick, while Eva attends to her schedule of social appearances ("Good Morning Miss Standing/My Most Intimate Friend"). The prime minister has been searching with all the means at his disposal for the Royal Family, but has had no luck. He just misses the King and Queen at the pool where Mowgli and the Queen have been doing their swimming lessons. The King believes that they are now running a risk of being caught, as he was photographed outside a news office. Meanwhile, Karen and Prince James have been comfortably living with each other for the past few days ("A Picture of Me Without You"). At a grand, Greek-themed party thrown by Eva (Ev'rybod-ee Who's Anybod-ee"), the Royal Family meet again. Two classical dances are performed, one of them featuring Karen ("The Judgment of Paris" and "Aphrodite's Dance"). News breaks out that the Royal Family is missing, and to calm the crowd Eva says that the Royal Family is in this very room and there is no need to worry ("Swing that Swing"). The Prime Minister demands the Royal Family step forward; they do, and they are dragged off to Feathermore, "that very nasty castle in the North" ("Finale Act One").

=== Act II ===
It is a rainy Sunday morning at Feathermore ("Sunday Morning Breakfast Time"). The Royal Family has invited all of their friends from the past week to the Castle, as they couldn't stand the dull routine practiced at Feathermore. When their friends arrive, they decide to abdicate the throne and run off to Rockwell-on-Sea before going to America ("Mr. and Mrs. Smith"). At Rockwell-on-Sea ("Six Little Wives"), both the Queen and the Princess win "Miss Rockwell 1935." The Prime Minister comes to them, dragging along Prince Peter and Prince Rudolph, revealing that there was no threat; they will return to the Palace for the Jubilee. Everyone bids their friends goodbye ("A Picture of Me Without You" (Reprise)). The King and Queen cheer up by listening to a favorite old song of theirs ("Me and Marie") before being arrested for bathing nude. As the prison burnt down, they are put in lion cages. With James' help, they knock out the zookeeper with a version of the King's string trick and escape. Meanwhile, Eric Dare and the Princess tearfully say goodbye ("When Love Comes Your Way" (Reprise)), and Karen and Prince James share their last dance ("It Was Just One of Those Things"). At the Jubilee, Eric, Karen, Eva, and Charles are awarded Jubilee honors and the two young Princes are allowed to go to Radio City ("Our Crown" (Reprise)). The King attempts to perform his string trick, but resorts to singing "Me and Marie" instead, as the curtain falls on the joyful scene ("Finale Ultimo").

== Song list ==
Act I

- Our Crown – Company
- We're Off to Feathermore – King, Queen, Prince James, Princess Diana
- We're Off to Feathermore (Reprise) – King, Queen, Prince James, Princess Diana
- Why Shouldn't I – Princess Diana
- Entrance of Eric (Gone Are The Days That Breed Despair) – Eric Dare, Satellites
- The Kling-Kling Bird on the Divi-Divi Tree – Eric Dare, Satellites
- The Kling-Kling Bird on the Divi-Divi Tree (Reprise) – Eric Dare, Satellites
- When Love Comes Your Way – Eric Dare, Princess Diana
- When Love Comes Your Way (Reprise) – Eric Dare
- What a Nice Municipal Park – Company
- "Mowgli and the White Goddess" – Charles Rausmiller
- When Me, Mowgli, Love – Charles Rausmiller
- Gather Ye Autographs While Ye May [Lost Song] – Satellites
- My Loulou – Company
- Begin the Beguine – Karen O'Kane
- Beguine Dance – Karen O'Kane, Prince James
- Good Morning, Miss Standing – Eva Standing and Secretaries
- My Most Intimate Friend – Eva Standing
- There's Nothing Like Swimming [Cut prior to Opening, but restored in most modern productions] – Queen, Swimmers
- A Picture of Me Without You – Karen O'Kane, Prince James
- Ev'rybod-ee Who's Anybod-ee – Company
- The Judgement of Paris – Ambrosine de Groot
- Aphrodite's Dance – Karen O'Kane, Dancers
- Swing That Swing – Eva Standing, Company
- Finale Act I ("Feathermore" Reprise) – King, Queen, Prince James, Princess Diana, Prime Minister, Company

Act II

- Sunday Morning Breakfast Time – Footmen
- Mr. and Mrs. Smith – King, Queen, Prince James, Princess Diana, Eva Standing, Eric Dare, Karen O'Kane, Charles Rausmiller
- Six Little Wives – Six Little Wives
- A Picture of Me Without You (Reprise) – King, Queen, Eva Standing, Charles Rausmiller
- Me and Marie – King, Queen, Company
- When Love Comes Your Way (Reprise) – Princess Diana
- It Was Just One of Those Things – Karen O'Kane, Prince James
- Our Crown (Reprise) – Company
- Finale Ultimo: Me and Marie (Reprise) – Entire Company

== Original production ==
The musical opened at the Shubert Theatre in Boston on September 21, 1935, for a three-week pre-Broadway tryout period. The Broadway premiere opened at the Imperial Theatre on October 12, 1935, and closed on May 7, 1936, after 169 performances. Changes in the lead lessened its appeal. Produced by Sam H. Harris and Max Gordon, the production was staged by Hassard Short, who also was the lighting designer, with dialog directed by Monty Woolley, choreographed by Albertina Rasch and Tony De Marco, and with set design by Jo Mielziner.

The cast included

- Melville Cooper as the King,
- Mary Boland as the Queen,
- Charles Walters as Prince James,
- Margaret Adams as Princess Diana,
- May Boley as Eva Standing,
- Marc Plant as Charles Rausmiller,
- June Knight as Karen O'Kane,
- Derek Williams as Eric Dare, and
- Montgomery Clift as Prince Peter.

== Reception ==
The New York Times reported on the musical's Boston opening (in September 1935), writing about Hart's book that it combines "satire, sentiment and humor in good proportion." Porter's score and lyrics were said to be "original and tuneful." Special mention was made of Mary Boland: "Miss Boland played the ingeniously sentimental matron with gusto and enthusiasm, wore royal robes or a one-piece bathing suit with equal aplomb, sang a bit, and danced with every sign of enjoyment."

It was considered "one of the great theatrical events of the 1930s." Of the Broadway opening (on October 12, 1935), Brooks Atkinson (The New York Times) wrote that the show

"is a rapturous masquerade.... Each of the guilds that produce our luxurious musical shows has shared equally in the general excellence of an upper-class song-and-dance arcade.... It is an excellent fable--good humored, slightly romantic and eminently pragmatic.... The music is jaunty, versatile and imaginative.... Mary Boland is the queen of the book and the performance is a carnival of comic delights."

Burns Mantle of the NY Daily News declared Jubilee was "the most satisfying musical comedy produced in an American theatre within the length of trustworthy memories." Reviewers admired the book, giving the show a strong plot and solid writing integrated with the music. They quickly picked "Begin the Beguine" and "Just One of Those Things" as favorite songs.

== Later productions ==
Despite its popular success, the musical was not signed by a theatrical leasing company for stock or amateur performances after its initial run. Performances between 1936 and 1948 were negotiated by the producers Max Gordon and Sam Harris. In 1948, the St. Louis Municipal Opera used the original orchestrations, but they were lost in transit to the Music Box Theatre. Jubilee became a lost show. It was not produced for 40 years afterward.

In 1985, The New Amsterdam Theatre Company hired Larry Moore to reconstruct the show. It was performed in 1986 as part of their series of classic musicals presented in concert at The Town Hall in New York. Alyson Reed played Karen, Carole Shelley was Eva, Patrick Quinn was Eric, and Roderick Cook was the Prime Minister. Rebecca Luker was in the cast.

Indiana University Opera staged the musical in 1992. 42nd Street Moon in San Francisco presented concert versions of Jubilee in 1993 and 1997 and a staged production in 2009.

In 1998, a concert version was staged at Carnegie Hall, New York City, for the benefit of the Gay Men's Health Crisis. Directed by Herbert Ross, with choreography by Danny Daniels, Lynne Taylor-Corbett and Pierre Dulaine, the cast included Bea Arthur as The Queen, Tyne Daly as Eva Standing, Sandy Duncan as Karen O'Kane, Michael Jeter as The King, Alice Ripley as The Princess, Stephen Spinella as Eric Dare, Bob Paris as Mowgli, and Philip Bosco as Prime Minister. New York's "Musicals Tonight!" theatre troupe presented a staged concert in October 2004.

The show has been produced twice by Ian Marshall Fisher's "Lost Musicals In Concert" series in London. The second production, using the BBC Concert Orchestra, was performed in 1999 at Her Majesty's Theatre and broadcast by the BBC.

The musical played for five weeks in 2012 at the Tabard Theatre in Chiswick, London.

== Recordings ==
In the pre-cast album era, musicals generally were popularized by recordings of its songs by vocalists or big bands and/or sales of its sheet music. The following were among contemporary releases:

- "Begin the Beguine/Waltz Down the Aisle" – Xavier Cugat and His Waldorf-Astoria Orchestra with vocal by Don Reid
- Begin the Beguine/Just One of Those Things/Me and Marie/When Love Comes Your Way/Why Shouldn't I? – Paul Whiteman and His Orchestra
- "Begin the Beguine/Me and Marie/Why Shouldn't I?" – Joe Haymes and His Orchestra
- "Just One of Those Things" – Nat Brandywynne and His Orchestra, Ted Fiorito, Richard Himber, Freddie Martin and His Orchestra, Garland Wilson
- "Me and Marie" – Johnny Green and His Orchestra
- "Waltz Down the Aisle" – Paul Whiteman and His Orchestra
- "When Love Comes Your Way/Me and Marie" – Jimmy Dorsey and His Orchestra
- "Why Shouldn't I?/A Picture of Me Without You" – Jimmy Dorsey and His Orchestra with vocals by Bob Eberle/Kay Weber
- "Why Shouldn't I?/When Love Comes Your Way" – Johnny Green and His Orchestra, with vocal by Marjory Logan
- "Begin the Beguine" – Artie Shaw and His Orchestra
