= Tom Platz =

American professional bodybuilder

- Professional bodybuilder
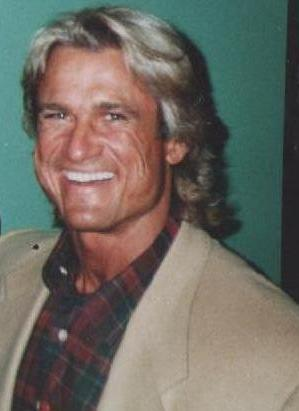
- Platz in 1995

Personal info
- Nickname: The Quadfather, The Golden Eagle, Quadzilla
- Born: June 26, 1955 (age 71); Fort Sill, Oklahoma, U.S.

Best statistics
- Height: 5 ft 7 29/32 in (1.72 m)
- Weight: 225-235 lb (102-106.6 kg)

Professional (Pro) career
- Pro-debut: World Pro Bodybuilding Championships; 1979
- Best win: IFBB Mr. Universe; 1981
- Active: 1973–1987

Thomas Steven Platz (born June 26, 1955) is an American retired professional bodybuilder. He was known for his leg development, which in his prime measured over 76.2 cm, earning him the nickname The Quadfather.

Platz was part of Vince McMahon's short-lived World Bodybuilding Federation (WBF). He ambushed the closing ceremonies of Mr. Olympia 1990 to announce its formation, after attending the event with McMahon as representatives of Bodybuilding Lifestyles magazine.

He is known contemporarily for seminar speeches on his life, work, inspirations, and motivation as well as for helping to train bodybuilders like David Hoffmann.

== Early life ==
Tom Platz was born on June 26, 1955. Upon looking at a Mr. Universe magazine at the age of 11 he decided to become a professional bodybuilder. At the age of 15, he weighed around 165 pounds. Platz later joined Armento’s Gym and was acquainted with Olympic weight lifters Norb Schemansky and Freddie Lowe and learned the proper way to squat. He developed strength and muscle size rapidly. With $50 to his name, he moved to Venice, California, in 1977 and trained at Gold’s Gym. That same year, he won his class at the Mr. Universe.

== 1992 "Squat Off" ==
In 1992, Tom Platz faced ‘Dr. Squat’ Fred Hatfield in a squat competition. The “squat-off,” as it’s often called, went down in Essen, Germany. It was decided that they’d compete in two phases — a max lift portion and a single set with 525 pounds for the most reps possible. For 525 pounds, Platz completed 23 reps. Dr. Squat, in contrast, managed 11 reps. This mattered little for Fred Hatfield, who, in the max lift part of the contest, squatted 855 pounds to Platz’s 765 pounds.

Competition record

Bodybuilder

IFBB Mr. Olympia
| 8th | IFBB Mr. Olympia 1979 |
| 8th | IFBB Mr. Olympia 1980 |
| 3rd | IFBB Mr. Olympia 1981 |
| 6th | IFBB Mr. Olympia 1982 |
| 9th | IFBB Mr. Olympia 1984 |
| 7th | IFBB Mr. Olympia 1985 |
| 11th | IFBB Mr. Olympia 1986 |

World Amateur Bodybuilding Championships
| 3rd | IFBB Mr. Universe 1978 |

World Pro Bodybuilding Championships
| 1st | IFBB Mr. Universe 1980 |

AAU Teen Mr. America
| 2nd | AAU Teen Mr. America 1974 |

AAU Mr. Southeastern USA
| 1st | AAU Mr. Southeastern USA 1977 |

AAU Mr. Ironman
| 1st | AAU Mr. Ironman 1973 |

AAU Mr. Adonis
| 1st | AAU Mr. Adonis 1973 |

AAU Mr. Michigan
| 1st | AAU Mr. Michigan 1975 |

Junior & Senior State Powerlifting Championships
| 1st | AAU 220 Class Champ 1974 |

IFBB Night of Champions
| 12th | IFBB Night of Champions 1980 |

IFBB Detroit Pro Invitational
| 6th | Detroit Pro Invitational 1987 |

== Books ==
Pro-style Bodybuilding by Tom Platz (Author), Bill Reynolds (Author), Paperback: 192 pages, Publisher: Sterling (May 20, 1985), Language English, ISBN 0806979100, ISBN 978-0806979106

== Filmography ==
- Who Killed Johnny Love? (1998) .... Emcee
- 8 Heads in a Duffel Bag (1997) .... Head of Hugo
- Flex...Body Love (1991)....Tom Steel, body builder
- Book of Love (1990) .... Body Builder
- Twins (1988) .... Granger Son #1
- The Comeback (also known as Arnold Schwarzenegger - Total Rebuild to Mr. Olympia) (1980) .... Himself

== See also ==
- List of male professional bodybuilders
- List of female professional bodybuilders
