= Hunter Labrada =

American bodybuilder

Hunter Labrada is an American bodybuilder, the eldest son of Lee Labrada. He has competed in five editions of Mr. Olympia. In 2023, he placed second at the Texas Pro, and he won first place (qualifying for the 2023 Mr. Olympia) at the 2023 Tampa Pro. Labrada also won first place (qualifying for the 2024 Mr. Olympia) at the 2024 Promuscle Italy Pro.

== Rankings ==
- 2020 Mr. Olympia: 8th place
- 2021 Mr. Olympia: 4th place, winning $40,000
- 2022 Mr. Olympia: 7th place, winning $30,000
- 2023 Mr. Olympia: 6th place
- 2024 Mr. Olympia: 6th place
