= Ali Malla =

- Professional bodybuilder

Best statistics

Professional (Pro) career
- Pro-debut: Mr. International; 1981
- Best win: Mr. International, light heavyweight; 1981
- Active: 1981–1987

Ali Malla is a Kurdish professional bodybuilder who competed on the IFBB professional circuit during the 1980s. Competing as a light heavyweight, he won his class at the 1981 Mr. International and placed 17th at the 1985 Mr. Olympia. He was the subject of feature coverage in bodybuilding magazines of the period, including a first-person feature in Muscle & Fitness and cover features in the British magazine BodyPower.

== Career ==
Malla turned professional in the early 1980s and competed in IFBB professional events in the United States and Europe between 1981 and 1987. His first recorded professional result came in 1981, when he did not place at the Grand Prix California but won the light heavyweight division of the Mr. International, the best result of his career.

He was most active in the mid-1980s, recording placings across the IFBB Grand Prix, Night of Champions and World Pro Championships circuits. He placed 7th at the 1985 Night of Champions and 17th at the 1985 Mr. Olympia, held on 26 October 1985 at the Forest National Theatre in Brussels, Belgium. His final recorded results were in 1987, at the Detroit Pro Championships and the Night of Champions.

== Media coverage ==
Malla was featured in bodybuilding magazines during and after his competitive career. The January 1983 issue of Muscle & Fitness carried a first-person feature headlined "Bodybuilding Saved My Life". The British magazine BodyPower ran him as a cover feature in September 1984, and featured him again in 1988 in a spread photographed by Art Zeller.

== Competitive record ==
Year	Competition	Division	Result
1981	Grand Prix California	Open	Did not place
1981	Mr. International	Light heavyweight	1st
1983	Grand Prix Denver	Open	3rd
1983	Grand Prix Las Vegas	Open	Did not place
1983	Grand Prix Portland	Open	8th
1983	Night of Champions	Open	8th
1983	World Pro Championships	Open	9th
1985	Night of Champions	Open	7th
1985	Mr. Olympia	Open	17th
1986	Los Angeles Pro Championships	Open	Did not place
1986	Night of Champions	Open	11th
1986	World Pro Championships	Open	15th
1987	Detroit Pro Championships	Open	7th
1987	Night of Champions	Open	Did not place
