= Mohammed Benaziza =

Algerian bodybuilder (1959–1992)

Mohammed Benaziza محمد بن عزيزة
- professional bodybuilder
- Historical photo of Mohammed Benaziza

Personal info
- Nickname: Momo
- Born: 1959; Algeria
- Died: 4 October 1992 (aged 32–33); Dirksland, Netherlands

Best statistics
- Height: 1.61 m (5 ft 3 in)
- Pro-debut: 1987
- Best win: 1990

Mohammed Benaziza (Arabic: محمد بن عزيزة; 1959 – 4 October 1992) was a professional bodybuilder.

== Biography ==
Benaziza was a soccer player in his childhood in France, and started to work out while continuing to play soccer. He finally chose bodybuilding and started competing as an amateur in France. He won his first competition in Spain (under 75 kg-category) and after that he continued to win small prizes until his first participation in the Night of Champions in 1990, which he won. Dorian Yates took second place. On that occasion, Benaziza was nicknamed the "Killer of Giants" by Joe Weider.

He participated in the prestigious Mr. Olympia contest three times. His last competition was the 1992 Mr. Olympia, where he placed 5th. He did not take time off and participated in a back-to-back competition in the Netherlands, a few weeks later. He was found dead in his hotel room at 6pm on 4 October 1992, shortly after that competition.

It was reported that he had earlier complained of sickness and shortness of breath, but refused repeatedly to go to a hospital. It is believed that the cause of his death was that he took an injection provided by an unidentified man to accelerate the process of his preparation shortly before the competition. His death led to the end of the career of his personal friend Steve Brisbois. Benaziza was 33 years old and was the star-spin of the new generation of BodyBuilders.

Dorian Yates, 6 times winner of the Mr. Olympia contest, and remembered in part for the exceptional development and thickness of his back muscles, cited Mohammed Benaziza as his main inspiration to work on that area:

It might sound strange now, but when I first competed, my first [international] contest [the Night of Champions 1990], I lost to a guy called Mohammed Benaziza, and his back was just freaky thick, it was like 3D coming out, that just stuck in my mind. [...] I put a picture of him on my fridge at home, I put a picture in the gym... And, funny enough, later on in my career I became known [as] the guy with the best back.

== Competition history ==
1987
World Amateur Championships - IFBB, LightWeight, 1st

1988
Grand Prix France - IFBB, 8th
Mr. Olympia - IFBB, 11th

1989
Grand Prix Finland - IFBB, 3rd
Grand Prix France - IFBB, 4th
Grand Prix Germany - IFBB, 3rd
Grand Prix Holland - IFBB, 2nd
Grand Prix Spain - IFBB, 4th
Grand Prix Sweden - IFBB, 5th
Mr. Olympia - IFBB, 5th

1990
Grand Prix England - IFBB, Winner
Grand Prix Finland - IFBB, Winner
Grand Prix France - IFBB, Winner
Grand Prix Germany - IFBB, Winner
Grand Prix Holland - IFBB, 2nd
Grand Prix Italy - IFBB, Winner
Night of Champions - IFBB, Winner

1991
Arnold Classic - IFBB, 11th
Ironman Pro Invitational - IFBB, 9th

1992
Arnold Classic - IFBB, 2nd
Grand Prix England - IFBB, 4th
Grand Prix Germany - IFBB, 2nd
Grand Prix Holland - IFBB, Winner
Grand Prix Italy - IFBB, Winner
Pittsburgh Pro Invitational - IFBB, 7th
Mr. Olympia - IFBB, 5th
