= Peary Rader =

American bodybuilder (1909–1991)

- Born: October 17, 1909; Peru, Nebraska, U.S.
- Died: November 24, 1991 (aged 82); Alliance, Nebraska, U.S.
- Occupations: Bodybuilder, magazine publisher

Peary Rader (October 17, 1909 – November 24, 1991) was an American early bodybuilder, Olympic lifter, writer, and magazine publisher from Nebraska. He was the founding publisher of Iron Man from 1936 to 1986.

== Early life ==
Rader was born on October 17, 1909, in Peru, Nebraska. He grew up near Hemingford in Box Butte County, Nebraska. He started lifting weights as a teenager and later shifted his emphasis to heavy, high repetition squats, building his bodyweight up to 210 pounds within about a year (he eventually reached 220 pounds).

== Career ==
Rader was victorious in a number of local and regional weightlifting contests, and also became proficient at a number of other lifts (such as the one-hand clean) and feats of strength. Rader was the Midwestern Heavyweight Champion for seven years, with official lifts of 220 pounds in the one-hand clean and jerk, 280 pounds in the two-hand clean and jerk, and a squat of 450 pounds (without support gear).

Rader founded Iron Man, a bodybuilding magazine, in 1936. The first issue was titled Super Physique. At its peak, the magazine had a circulation of 40,000. Rader published Iron Man through the September 1986 issue, which included a number of letters from prominent people in the field to celebrate the magazine's fiftieth anniversary. In 1986, Rader sold the magazine to John Balik, who repositioned it as a hard-core bodybuilding magazine. Rader also published Lifting News for many years. He authored approximately 1,300 magazine articles; most were in Iron Man, but some were also published in Strength Athlete.

Rader was the chairman of the National Body Building Association. He was inducted into the Body Building Hall of Fame and the Power Lifting Hall of Fame. In the 1950s, alongside Bob Hoffman and Joe Weider, Rader was a "pioneer" in the commercialization of protein as a bodybuilding supplement.

== Personal life and death ==
Rader married the former Mabel Kirchner in 1936; they had two sons, Jack and Gene.

Rader died on November 24, 1991, in Alliance, Nebraska, at the age of 82.
