= Danny Padilla (bodybuilder) =

American bodybuilder

- Professional bodybuilder

Personal info
- Nickname: The Giant Killer
- Born: 3 April 1951 (age 75); Rochester, New York

Best statistics
- Height: 5 ft 2 in (1.57 m)
- Weight: 175 lb (79 kg)

Professional (Pro) career
- Pro-debut: Junior Mr America - AAU, 8th; 1972
- Best win: IFBB Mr. America (Overall), 1977
- Active: Retired 2000

Dennis "Danny" Padilla (born April 3, 1951) is an American bodybuilder, known as "The Giant Killer".

== Early life ==
Padilla started training when he was seven years old in Rochester, New York. He had been watching his older brother and cousin lift weights together in order to become stronger for their wrestling competitions. He acquired a rusty York barbell, as a hand-me-down from his brother Ray, and quickly set about to become Mr. America. It wasn’t long before he was absolutely smitten with the iron game and training a full seven days a week.

== Bodybuilding career ==
By the time Padilla was eighteen, he was ready to compete. He won the Mr. Rochester contest in 1970 while still in high school. It was his first show, and he took home the first place trophy.

He entered a lot of other smaller competitions in the upstate New York area, including Mr. Buffalo and Mr. Syracuse. After establishing himself in the local arena, he progressed to participating in both the Junior Mr. America and the Mr. America contests. He finished in the top twenty of both competitions.

Padilla then entered the Amateur Athletic Union (AAU) World Championships in the lightweight division. He recalled, "I lost to a guy who didn’t even shave his legs!" This defeat was a turning point. After the show, the judges were “kind” enough to inform him that, in their studied opinion, he had a great physique but, at 5' 2" tall, was much too short to compete.

After that AAU show, Padilla decided to compete in the International Federation of Bodybuilders (IFBB) instead. His first contest was the 1975 IFBB Mr. USA. It was held at the old Madison Square Garden in New York City. It was the first time that the 23-year-old had ever seen bodybuilders from the West Coast. They included Arnold Schwarzenegger, Franco Columbu, Robby Robinson and many others. To his surprise, he not only won his lightweight division, but also took the overall title.

It was during that impressive first outing with the IFBB that Padilla first met Joe Weider. Weider introduced himself to the "kid from Rochester" backstage at the contest, telling Padilla that he had a great physique and that he could do very well in the sport. Weider also invited him to train in California.

Padilla arrived in Los Angeles just in time to take part in the filming of Pumping Iron. He trained for three months to prepare to compete in the lightweight division in the upcoming Mr. Universe competition in South Africa for which he had qualified to compete based on his earlier Mr. USA win.

Disaster struck in Pretoria. Just minutes before the Universe show was to begin, Padilla was told that he could not compete. The IFBB decided that they’d rather have two heavyweights represent the United States - Ken Waller and Mike Katz - and one middleweight, Robby Robinson. Their reasoning was that since Katz was retiring, they should let him try to win the Universe for the last time. Padilla quickly maneuvered to get a spot on Portugal’s team. He felt confident that he was in a position to win in the lightweight category and was determined to compete. After all of his pre-contest preparation, travel to South Africa and hours of participation in the filming of the movie, he would try to take home the title, even under Portugal’s flag. The IFBB would have none of this. Padilla was disqualified by them in order to avoid what they perceived as the “embarrassment” that his potential win for Portugal would cause the organization.

Padilla now exists as a visual footnote in Pumping Iron. The film makers were forced to cut the majority of his scenes from the film because the IFBB did not want the whole incident depicted in the movie.

Bouncing back the following year, Padilla competed in the IFBB Universe, but was defeated by Mohamed Makkawy. In 1977, he again entered the IFBB fray and competed in the Mr. America. This time he walked off the stage with a trophy for both his weight class and the overall title. It was the first time a lightweight had beaten both a middle and heavyweight for the overall title. That same year, Padilla won the lightweight title at the IFBB Mr. Universe. He is one of only two men in the history of the sport to win both the America and the Universe in the same year, the other being Frank Zane. Padilla followed up with a great showing at the 1977 Mr. Olympia. He was in the top five in both his weight class and in the overall standings.

Padilla's best Olympia result was 5th place at the 1981 Olympia, as this show featured a single, combined weight division, used in all Olympias since 1980.

Danny was inducted into Joe Weider's IFBB Bodybuilding Hall Of Fame in 2009.

== Contest History ==
1972

Junior Mr America - AAU, 8th

1973

Mr America - AAU, 15th
Junior Mr America - AAU, 15th

1974

Mr America - AAU, 18th
Junior Mr America - AAU, Did not place
Mr World - AAU, Short, Did not place

1975

Mr USA - IFBB, Short, 1st
Mr USA - IFBB, Overall Winner

1976

Mr America - IFBB, Short, 1st
Universe - IFBB, Lightweight, 2nd

1977

Mr America - IFBB, Overall Winner
Mr America - IFBB, Lightweight, 1st
Universe - IFBB, Lightweight, 1st

1978

1978 Mr. Olympia - IFBB, Lightweight, 3rd
1978 Mr. Olympia - IFBB, Overall, 6th
Professional World Cup - IFBB, 2nd
USA vs the World - IFBB, Lightweight, 1st

1979

Best in the World - IFBB, Professional, 5th
Florida Pro Invitational - IFBB, 3rd
Grand Prix Pennsylvania - IFBB, 5th
Night of Champions - IFBB, 2nd
1979 Mr. Olympia - IFBB, Lightweight, 5th

1980

Grand Prix Miami - IFBB, 3rd
1980 Mr. Olympia - IFBB, 10th

1981

1981 Mr. Olympia - IFBB, 5th

1982

Night of Champions - IFBB, 5th
1982 Mr. Olympia - IFBB, 12th

1983

Night of Champions - IFBB, 9th

1984

World Pro Championships - IFBB, 7th

1985

1985 Mr. Olympia - IFBB, 16th

1986

World Pro Championships - IFBB, 13th

1990

Grand Prix England - IFBB, 5th
Grand Prix Finland - IFBB, 4th
Grand Prix France - IFBB, 5th
Grand Prix Germany - IFBB, 7th
Grand Prix Holland - IFBB, 7th
Grand Prix Italy - IFBB, 4th
Niagara Falls Pro Invitational - IFBB, 2nd
Night of Champions - IFBB, 3rd

1991

WBF Grand Prix - WBF, 10th

1994

Olympia - Masters - IFBB, 7th

2000

Olympia - Masters - IFBB, 10th

2009

IFBB Hall Of Fame

== See also ==
- List of male professional bodybuilders
