= Premchand Degra =

Indian bodybuilder

Premchand Degra is an IFBB professional bodybuilder from India. He won the World Amateur Bodybuilding Championships title in the short-height 80 kg category in 1988. He was also awarded the "Achievement Medal" by the International Federation of Bodybuilding and Fitness (IFBB) in 2003 for winning its World Middleweight Champion title in 1988.

Degra lives in Hoshiarpur (Punjab) and trains budding bodybuilders in his own gym. He was awarded the Padma Shri in 1990 and the Arjuna Award in 1988 by the Government of India.

== Biography ==
Born on 1 December 1955 (age 70) at Babri Nangal village in the Gurdaspur district of Punjab He began his sports career as a wrestler after completing his matriculation from Government High School of the neighboring Tibber village in 1973. In 1975, he joined the Punjab Police, but left the police job in 1984 to follow his passion of bodybuilding. It was only in 1980 that he developed an interest in bodybuilding and rose to be crowned Mr. Punjab, Mr. North India, Mr. India (9 times in a row), Mr. Asia (8 times), finally Mr. World (Middle-weight class), and Mr. Universe. He currently resides in the city of Hoshiarpur (Punjab), India and runs a world class gym in the same city.

== Bodybuilding career ==
The world title earned him the Padma Shri in 1990. Earlier, he had received the Arjuna Award in 1986. He is also the recipient of the Punjab Government's Maharaja Ranjit Singh Award (1994), Tata best Sportsman Award (1986) Charminar Challenge Trophy. Prem made his national debut by claiming a Bronze Medal in Middle-Weight Class at Darjeeling in 1980. He followed it up by winning three Gold Medals next year that made him Mr. Punjab, Junior Mr. India, and Senior Mr. India 1981. He retained the title of Mr. India in the middleweight category 1984. Thereafter he moved over to Light Heavy Weight Class and, for next five years (1985–1989), won the title of Mr. India in this class.

He began his international career by securing the title of Mr. Asia in Middle-weight Class at Karachi in 1983, a feat he was to repeat at Seoul in 1984. Subsequently, he switched over to Light Heavy-weight Class in the Mr. Asia contest, winning the title at Colombo in 1985, Taipei in 1986, and Malaysia in 1987.

Degra stuck to Middle-weight Class in all the five appearances he made at the World Championships. He first competed for the world title in 1984 at Las Vegas, where he finished 14th. He moved up to 4th position in 1985 in Sweden and was named the Most Improved Bodybuilder of the year. He won silver medal in Tokyo in 1986 and was again placed at 4th place in Madrid (Spain) in 1987. The climax came in 1988 when at Queensland in Australia, he won the Gold in Middle-Weight class and was crowned Mr. Universe. Prem Degra turned professional in 1989 and the same year participated in the Mr. Olympia contest. He then went on to win the 1st Pro-Am Classic of Mr. Asia in 1990 and the 2nd Pro-Am Classic of Mr. Asia in 1991. Five years later, he returned to win the Gold in Light Heavy-weight category of Mr. Asia championship held at Delhi in 1996.

== Bodybuilding titles ==
- 1983 Asian Amateur Championships - IFBB, MiddleWeight, 1st
- 1984 Asian Amateur Championships - IFBB, MiddleWeight, 1st
- 1985 Asian Amateur Championships - IFBB, MiddleWeight, 1st
- 1985 World Amateur Bodybuilding Championships - IFBB, MiddleWeight, 4th
- 1986 Asian Amateur Championships - IFBB, Light-HeavyWeight, 1st
- 1986 World Amateur Bodybuilding Championships - IFBB, MiddleWeight, 2nd
- 1987 Asian Amateur Championships - IFBB, Light-HeavyWeight, 1st
- 1987 World Amateur Bodybuilding Championships - IFBB, MiddleWeight, 4th
- 1988 World Amateur Bodybuilding Championships - IFBB, MiddleWeight, 1st
- 1989 Mr. Olympia - IFBB, 16th
- 1992 Niagara Falls Pro Invitational - IFBB, 18th
- 1996 Asian Amateur Championships - IFBB, Light-MiddleWeight, 1st
