= Gary Strydom =

South African bodybuilder

- professional bodybuilder

Personal info
- Born: 1960; Durban, South Africa

Best statistics
- Height: 6 ft 2 in (188 cm)
- Weight: 283 lb (128 kg) (Contest); 305 lb (138 kg) (Off-Season)

Professional (Pro) career
- Pro-debut: 1987 IFBB Night of Champions; 1987
- Best win: 1987 IFBB Night of Champions; 1983-1992

Gary Strydom (born 1960) is a South African-born American IFBB professional bodybuilder. He is notable as being the only person to win a Championship title under Vince McMahon's now defunct World Bodybuilding Federation. After the fall of the WBF, Strydom decided to take a long break from competing in the mid 1990s. Prior to the WBF, Strydom won four IFBB professional titles.

Gary Strydom is also known for his line of bodybuilding clothing called Crazee Wear. He started the brand in 1989 and it was known for its baggy colorful pants.

== Stats ==
- Height: 6 ft 2 in (188 cm)
- Off Season Weight: 305 pounds (138 kg)
- Competition Weight: 283 pounds (128 kg)
- Upper Arm Size: 22 in (56 cm)
- Chest Size: 61 in (150 cm)
- Thigh Size: 29 in (74 cm)
- Waist Size: 32 in (81 cm)
- Calf Size: 19 in (48 cm)
- Neck Size: 19.5 in (50 cm)

== Contest history ==
- 1983 NPC Florida Championships, Junior - Heavyweight, 1st and Overall
- 1984 NPC USA Championships, HeavyWeight, 1st
- 1986 NPC Nationals, HeavyWeight, 1st and Overall
- 1987 IFBB Night of Champions, Winner
- 1988 Chicago Pro Invitational, 2nd
- 1988 Mr. Olympia, 5th
- 1989 Arnold Classic, 3rd
- 1989 Grand Prix France, 1st
- 1989 Grand Prix Germany, 2nd
- 1989 Grand Prix Melbourne, 1st
- 1989 Grand Prix Spain (2), 2nd
- 1989 Grand Prix Spain, 2nd
- 1989 Grand Prix Sweden, 1st
- 1989 World Pro Championships, 2nd
- 1990 Grand Prix England, 2nd
- 1990 Grand Prix Finland, 3rd
- 1990 Grand Prix France, 2nd
- 1990 Grand Prix Germany, 4th
- 1990 Grand Prix Italy, 3rd
- 1990 Houston Pro Invitational, 2nd
- 1990 Ironman Pro Invitational, 4th
- 1991 Night of the Champions
- 1991 WBF Championships, 1st
- 1992 WBF Championships, 1st
- 1996 Night of Champions, 12th
- 2006 Colorado Pro Championships, 7th

== See also ==
- List of male professional bodybuilders
- List of female professional bodybuilders
