= Pavol Jablonický =

Slovak bodybuilder

Pavol Jablonicky is a Slovak International Federation of BodyBuilders professional bodybuilder.

Jablonický was born on 24 January 1963 in Senica. He grew up in the nearby village of Borský Mikuláš.

== Competitive stats ==
- Height: 5'8"
- Born: January 24, 1961

== Contest history ==
- 1987 European Amateur Championships, Light-Heavyweight, 1st
- 1987 World Amateur Championships, Light-Heavyweight, 1st
- 1988 World Amateur Championships, HeavyWeight, 1st
- 1989 Grand Prix Holland, 12th
- 1989 Mr. Olympia, 16th
- 1990 Grand Prix Germany, 5th
- 1990 Grand Prix Holland, 3rd
- 1990 Ironman Pro Invitational, 9th
- 1991 Mr. Olympia, Did not place
- 1992 Night of Champions, 9th
- 1993 Grand Prix Germany (2), 7th
- 1993 Grand Prix Germany, 5th
- 1993 Night of Champions, 9th
- 1994 Arnold Classic, 12th
- 1994 Grand Prix Germany (2), 11th
- 1995 Grand Prix Ukraine, 9th
- 1995 Niagara Falls Pro Invitational, 2nd
- 1995 Mr. Olympia, 16th
- 1996 Night of Champions, 8th
- 1997 Night of Champions, 5th
- 1998 Night of Champions, 14th
- 1999 Night of Champions, 2nd
- 1999 Mr. Olympia, 14th
- 1999 Toronto Pro Invitational, 1st
- 2000 Night of Champions, 6th
- 2001 Night of Champions, 4th
- 2001 Mr. Olympia, *19th
- 2003 Grand Prix Hungary, 1st
- 2003 Night of Champions, 2nd
- 2004 Hungarian Pro Invitational, 1st
- 2004 Night of Champions, 5th
- 2004 Mr. Olympia, 11th
- 2004 Toronto Pro Invitational, 4th
- 2005 Europa Supershow, 7th
- 2006 Masters Pro World, 3rd
- 2006 New York Pro Championships, 10th

== See also ==
- List of male professional bodybuilders
- List of female professional bodybuilders
