= Lee Haney =

American bodybuilder (born 1959)

- Professional bodybuilder
- Haney in 2014

Personal info
- Born: November 11, 1959 (age 66); Spartanburg, South Carolina, U.S.

Best statistics
- Height: 5 ft 11 in (1.80 m)
- Weight: 255 lb (116 kg) (Contest); 265 lb (120 kg) (Off season)

Professional (Pro) career
- Pro-debut: World Pro Championships in Atlantic City; 1983
- Best win: Mr. Olympia; 1984–1991
- Predecessor: Samir Bannout
- Successor: Dorian Yates

Lee Haney (born November 11, 1959) is an American former professional bodybuilder. Haney shares the all-time record for most Mr. Olympia titles at eight with Ronnie Coleman. The winner of the Mr. Olympia title for eight consecutive years, he is widely regarded as among the greatest professional bodybuilders of all time. From 1999 to 2002, he served as chairman of the President's Council on Physical Fitness and Sports. In 2014, he was inducted into the International Sports Hall of Fame.

== Early life ==
Haney grew up in Spartanburg, South Carolina. He is a graduate of Spartanburg Methodist College, where he earned a degree in youth counseling and juvenile corrections. The family resides in Atlanta, Georgia.

== Career ==
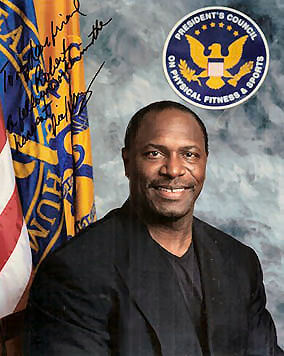
Haney c. 2000

President Bill Clinton appointed Haney chairman of the President's Council on Physical Fitness and Sports. A devout born again Christian, Haney has his own program on the Trinity Broadcasting Network called "TotaLee Fit with Lee Haney," where he is usually joined by famous Christian sportsmen, and on occasion his wife. On the show he teaches the importance of both physical and spiritual growth. One of his most famous quotes is that we should "train to stimulate, not annihilate."

In 2014, Haney was inducted into the International Sports Hall of Fame.

== Stats ==
- Height: 5 ft 11 in (180 cm)
- Off Season Weight: 275–285 pounds (125–129 kg)
- Competition Weight: 230 pounds (104 kg)–260 pounds (118 kg)
- Chest size: 56 in (142 cm)
- Neck size: 20 in (51 cm)
- Arm Size: 21 in (53 cm)
- Waist: 32.5 in (83 cm)
- Thigh Size: 30 in (76.2 cm)
- Calf Size: 20 in (50.8 cm)

== Bodybuilding titles ==
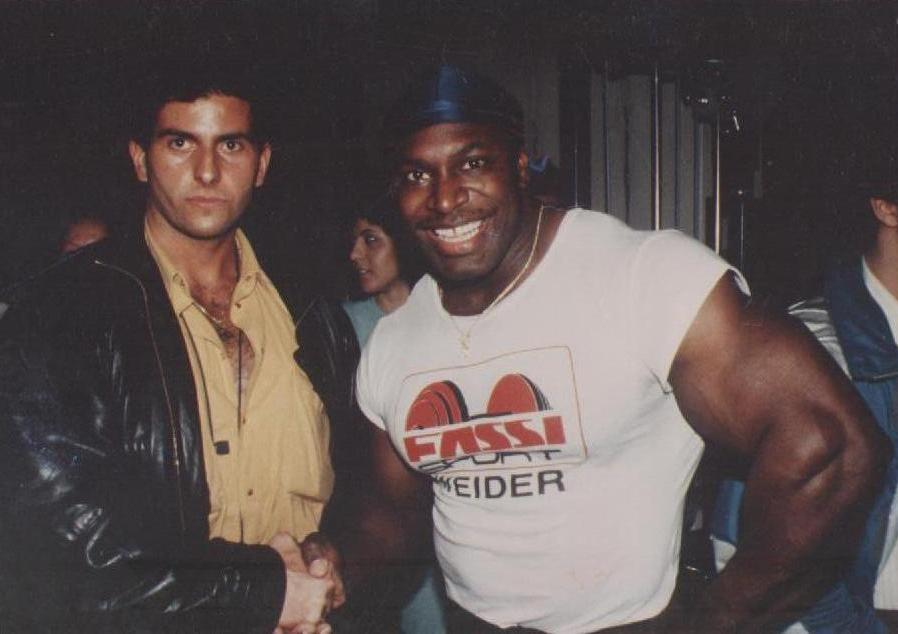
Lee Haney with Paolo Tassetto in 1988

- 1979 Teen Mr. America
- 1979 Teen Mr. America Tall, 1st
- 1982 Junior Nationals Heavyweight & Overall, 1st
- 1982 Nationals Heavyweight & Overall, 1st
- 1982 World Amateur Championships Heavyweight, 1st
- 1983 Grand Prix England, 2nd
- 1983 Grand Prix Las Vegas, 1st
- 1983 Grand Prix Sweden, 2nd
- 1983 Grand Prix Switzerland, 3rd
- 1983 Night of Champions, 1st
- 1983 Mr. Olympia, 3rd
- 1983 World Pro Championships, 3rd
- 1984 Mr. Olympia, 1st
- 1985 Mr. Olympia, 1st
- 1986 Mr. Olympia, 1st
- 1987 Mr. Olympia, 1st
- 1987 Grand Prix Germany (II), 1st
- 1988 Mr. Olympia, 1st
- 1989 Mr. Olympia, 1st
- 1990 Mr. Olympia, 1st
- 1991 Mr. Olympia, 1st

== See also ==
- List of male professional bodybuilders

Preceded by Samir Bannout	Mr. Olympia; 1984–1991	Succeeded by Dorian Yates
