= Paolo Tassetto =

Italian weightlifting coach (born 1959)

- Tassetto in 2008

Personal information
- Nationality: Italian
- Born: 20 April 1959 (age 67) Oderzo, Treviso, Italy
- Occupation: Strength coach

Sport
- Country: Italy
- Sport: Olympic weightlifting
- Now coaching: 2015 Biancoscudati Padova 2015–2016 Padova 2016–2017 Padova (youth teams)

Paolo Tassetto (born 20 April 1959) is an Italian weightlifting coach, Physical Training Master of the Italian Weightlifting Federation, and strength and conditioning expert. He is an Honoured Master in Olympic weightlifting.

== Biography ==
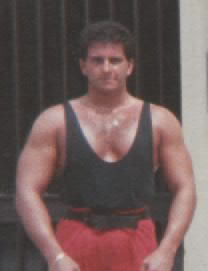
Tassetto in 1986

Tassetto in 1990

He was born in 1959, the son of veteran Carabiniere Cesare Tassetto, in Oderzo, in the province of Treviso, Veneto, Italy, and later he moved to Padua.

In 1974 he appeared in the world of Sport with football and in 1976 he entered in the view of Martial arts with Karate, improving in Combat sports. In 1977 he participated in throwing competitions at the Youth Games.

His career as an expert in strength training and conditioning began in 1984 with AICAP-WABBA (Associazione Italiana Culturismo e Alzate Potenza-World Amateur Body Building Association); in 1987 he became a FIACF-IFBB (Federazione Italiana Amatori Cultura Fisica-International Federation of BodyBuilding & Fitness) instructor; then in 1989 he received the diploma of weightlifting and physical culture trainer for FILPJ at Acqua Acetosa sports center, while in 1994 he became National Amateur Body-Builders' Association coach. In the same year, at Luigi Sacco Hospital, he received the Fitness instructor certification. In 1996, at the National School of Wrestling weightlifting Judo Karate/School of sport-CONI of FILPJK s Ostia, he qualified as an instructor of weightlifting.

Paolo Tassetto has assisted many athletes, including Lorenzo Fields (running back of the American football team, Saints Padua), Angelo Montrone and Emanuele Pellizzaro (respectively forward and captain of Football Padova). He was physical trainer for two Olympians: the fencer of Centro Sportivo Carabinieri Matteo Zennaro, 2000 Sydney and the canoe sprinter of Gruppi Sportivi Fiamme Gialle Andrea Facchin, 2008 Beijing.

== Coaching career ==
In 2015 he entered in the technical staff of Calcio Padova, of mister Parlato, later substituted by Giuseppe Pillon. In the same year he entered with the same role in the youth field of Under 15, Under 16, Under 17 and Berretti teams.

Already certified personal fitness trainer ISSA (International Sports Sciences Association), on 14 December 2002 he was admitted, after passing the special exam at the Federation Palace of CONI, to the federal roll of technical teachers with the title of weightlifting and physical culture master, the highest level for FIPCF (Federazione Italiana Pesistica e Cultura Fisica-Italian Weightlifting and Physical Culture Federation).

== Awards and Merits ==
Recommended by his sports federation as a particularly distinguished coach, he was awarded prizes by CONI in the years 2003, 2008 and 2011 at the Padua sports "Gala".

In 2009 he was awarded by the President of the Italian Republic the honour of Knight of the Order of Merit of the Italian Republic.

For his career in 2013, on a proposal of the committee of sporting merits, the national board CONI (Italian National Olympic Committee) awarded him the honour of the Bronze Palm for Technical Merit.

In 2017 he was awarded by the President of the Italian Republic the honour of Officer of the Order of Merit of the Italian Republic.

Due to the national and international results achieved by his athletes, in 2018 he was awarded by the CONI with the high honour of the Silver Palm for Technical Merit, with appraisal from president Giovanni Malagò: "... in recognition of the results obtained as a sports technician. With this honor, the national sports organization, as well as certifying your skills and the results obtained in this activity, also wishes to express deep gratitude for the commitment you have dedicated to sport over many years."

In 2019 he has been nominated as a Praiseworthy Master by the president of FIPE/EWF, Antonio Urso.

=== Honours ===
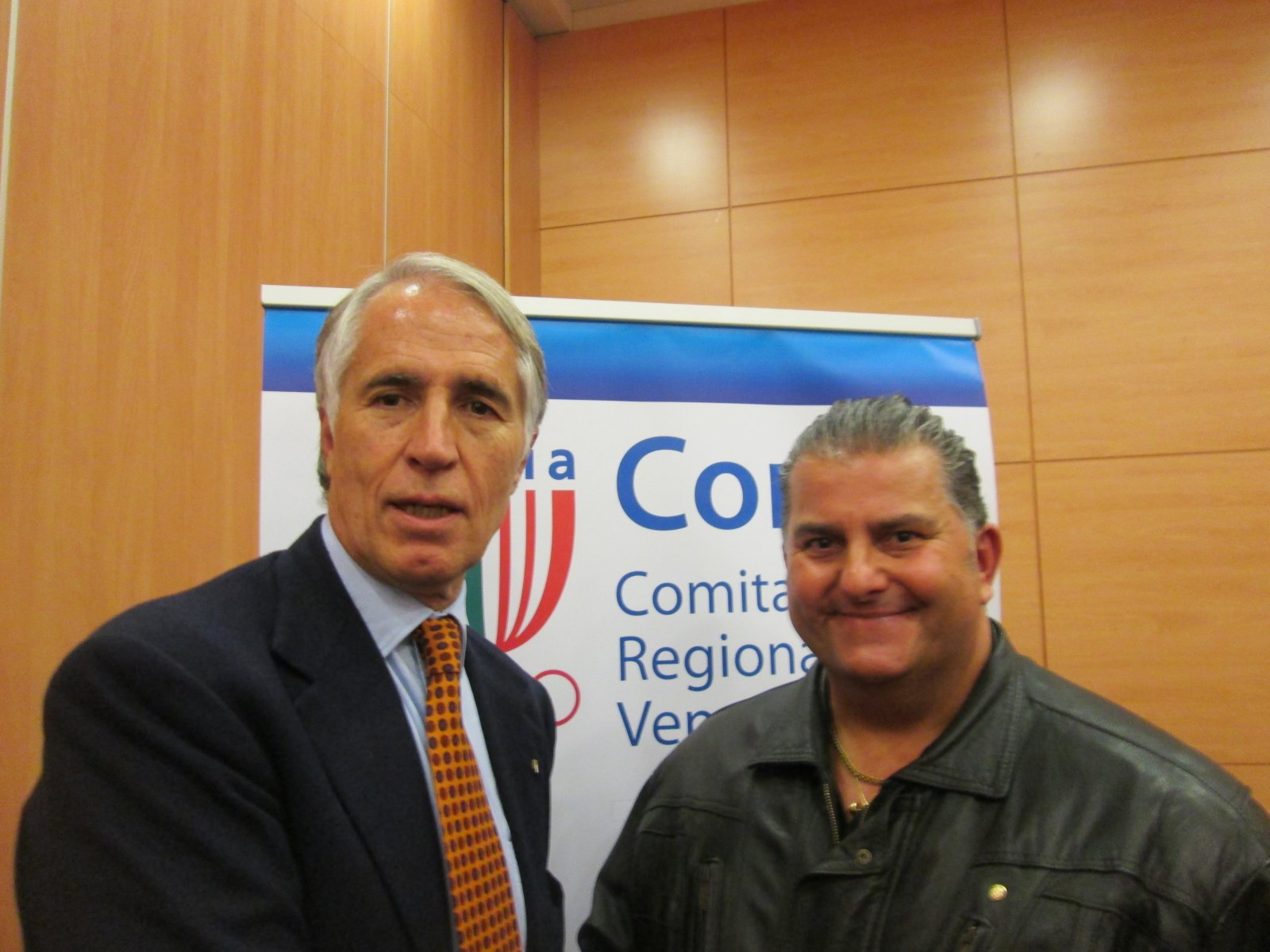
The M° Paolo Tassetto together with Italian National Olympic Committee president Giovanni Malagò

4th Class / Officer: Ufficiale Ordine al Merito della Repubblica Italiana

— Rome, 2 June 2017

5th Class / Knight: Cavaliere Ordine al Merito della Repubblica Italiana

— Rome, 27 December 2009

Palm Technical Merit: Palma d'argento al Merito Tecnico

— Rome, 10 July 2018

Palm Technical Merit: Palma di bronzo al Merito Tecnico

— Rome, 8 October 2013

== Awards ==
- 2003 – CONI.
- 2008 – CONI.
- 2009 – Certificate of Merit FIPCF, the highest honorary certificate of the Italian Federation of Weightlifting and Physical Culture, "for meritorious work done in favor of physical culture, with emphasis on the development of issues concerning physical training and competition through the use of overload (Strength training)".
- 2011 – CONI.
- Rome, 5 March 2014 – Certificate of Merit from the ANC (National Carabinieri Association), "for the shared ideals and values of the Carabinieri Armed Forces and of the National Carabinieri Association".
- Rome, 4 May 2019 – He was named by FIPE as Praiseworthy Master, receiving the license, the relative diploma and the permanent card, as a prestigious recognition "for the valuable and multi-year work performed as Technical Trainer in favor of the Italian Weightlifting Federation".
- Rome, 15 December 2020 – He was named by ANC (National Carabinieri Association) as Meritorious Member, receiving the license and the relative permanent card, “for the commitment and acquired merit towards the Carabinieri Armed Service for Sport Merit and the ANC”.
- Genoa, 10 June 2023 – He was awarded the title of "Knight of Sport" by the National Order Knights of Sport, with the support of ASI.
