= Bob Paris =

American and Canadian writer, actor, civil rights activist and retired pro athlete

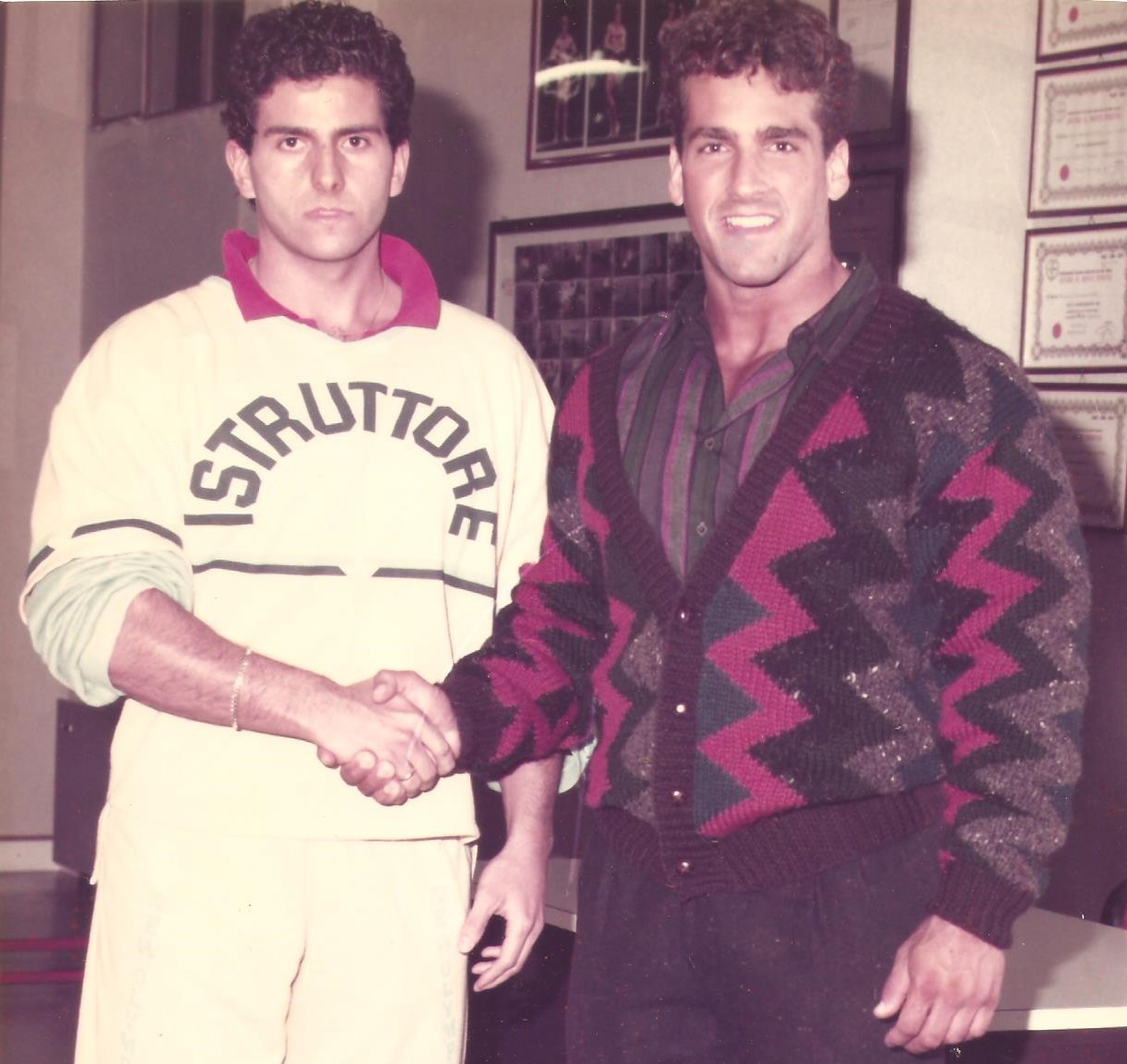
- Paolo Tassetto (on the left) with Bob Paris in Padua, Italy in 1986
- Born: Robert Clark Paris; December 14, 1959 (age 66); Columbus, Indiana, U.S.
- Spouse: Brian LeFurgey (m. 2003)
- Website: http://www.bobparis.com

Robert Clark Paris (born December 14, 1959) is an American writer, actor, public speaker, civil rights activist, and former professional bodybuilder. Paris was the 1983 NPC American National and IFBB World Bodybuilding Champion. In 1989, he came out as gay in the media while still an active competitor in his sport.

== Biography ==
=== Early life ===
Paris was born and grew up in Brown County and Columbus, Indiana. From an early age, he was both artistic and athletic. He won National Scholastic awards for his drawings and paintings and wrote short stories. Paris was also involved in his school's debate team and a member of the International Thespian Society. Paris played several sports in high school: track and field, golf, and particularly football. After experimenting with weight training as a sophomore, Paris started to gain size and strength.

He moved to southern California to pursue dreams of becoming a bodybuilder and actor. Within two years he had won two competitions: Mr. Los Angeles and Mr. Southern California.

=== Career ===
Since rising to fame in the early 1980s, Bob Paris has appeared on the covers of scores of magazines worldwide. He is noted for his aesthetics and artistic approach toward the sport.

In the July 1989 issue of Ironman, Paris came out in the media as a gay man. That year, Paris appeared on The Oprah Winfrey Show to discuss marriage and being gay. Oprah asked Paris, "Bob, why not just stay in the closet?" Paris said "you fall in love" and it doesn't feel right to hide it.

Paris and his then-boyfriend, Rod Jackson, became symbols for gay marriage and advocated gay rights. Paris's career suffered for it; he lost about 80% of his bookings and endorsements for bodybuilding. He has said he received death threats through mail and by phone.

He became a dedicated advocate for the rights of athletes and an outspoken voice in the push for drug testing at the professional level.

He retired from bodybuilding in 1991, but competed in the 1992 Chicago Pro Championships-IFFB, finishing 10th.

On October 10, 1998, he made his New York stage debut, starring at Carnegie Hall opposite Bea Arthur, Sandy Duncan, Michael Jeter, Philip Bosco, Alice Ripley, and Tyne Daly in the Broadway musical Jubilee as the character Mowgli.

In 2006, Flex Magazine ranked Bob Paris the most aesthetic athlete in the history of bodybuilding.

In 2009, he performed in a recurring role on the first season of the ABC Television series, Defying Gravity.

Paris remains a civil rights advocate and public speaker. He is also a model and a classically trained theater actor.

== Personal life ==
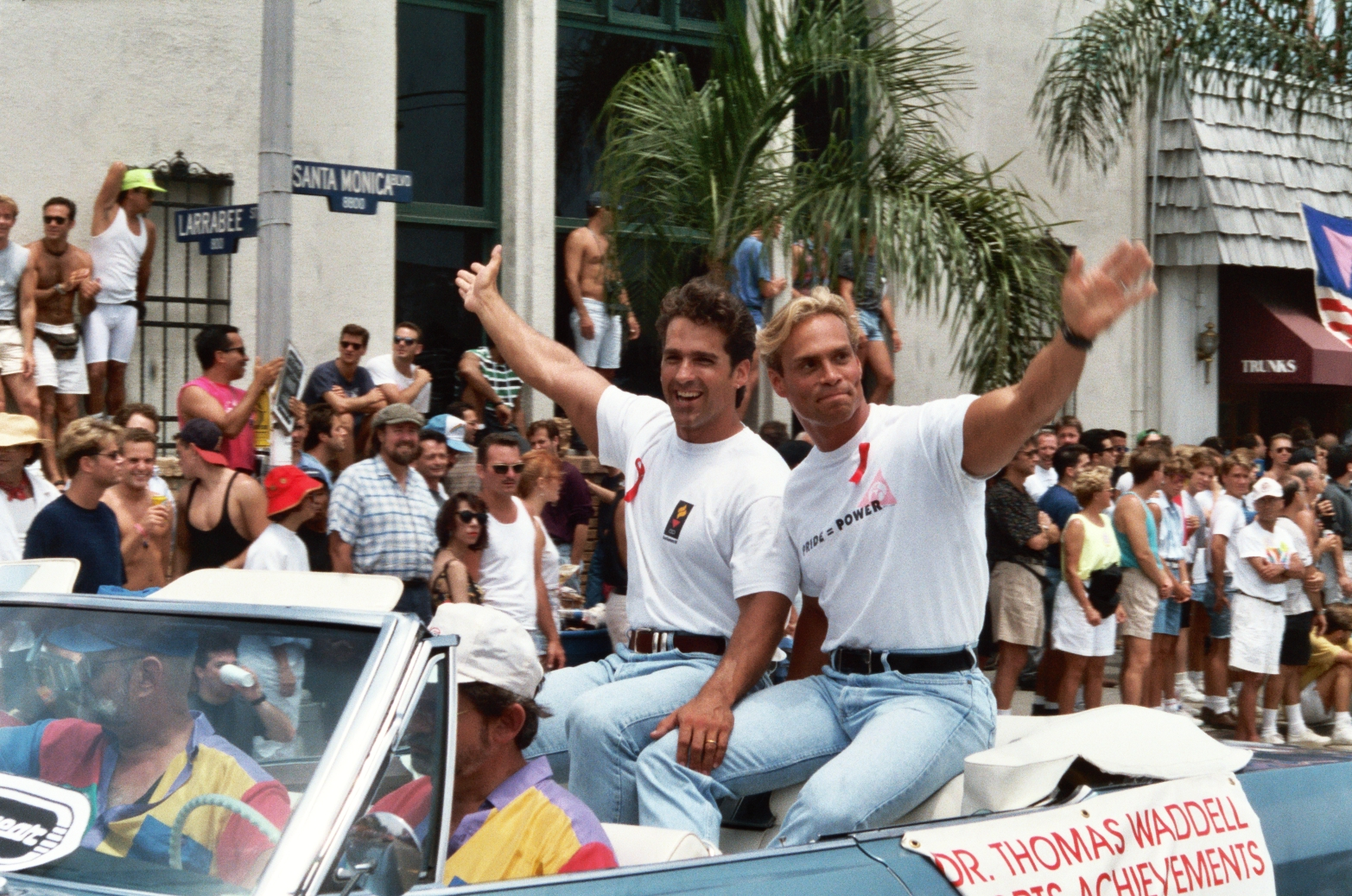
Bob Paris and Rod Jackson (on the right) in June 1993

Paris and Jackson were seen as a model relationship in the gay community, yet they split up after seven years due to undisclosed difficulties. Paris and Jackson's relationship was constantly in the limelight, hence making the breakup very public. Paris said that he kept trying to keep his relationship going even when he knew better; Paris felt that he would be giving gays a bad image if he and Jackson broke up.

In 2012, Paris wrote on his website that he never wanted to be a "lifestyle bodybuilder." He said he enjoyed the discipline and focus bodybuilding engendered; he also simply just excelled at the sport. To Paris, bodybuilding allowed him to be artistic and a jock all at once, and the sport allowed him to exert his physical presence to the world in a way that demonstrated that he was a man.

As of 2015, Paris was still active in fitness, but not as intensely as he once was, and saw himself more as a writer over anything else.

Paris lives with his husband, Brian LeFurgey, on an island near Vancouver, British Columbia. He holds dual American and Canadian citizenship. Together since 1996, Paris and LeFurgey were married in British Columbia after the province equalized the marriage laws in 2003.

== Books by Bob Paris ==
- Beyond Built: Bob Paris' Guide to Achieving the Ultimate Look (1990)
- Flawless: The 10-Week Total Image Method for Transforming Your Physique (1993)
- Natural Fitness
- Straight From The Heart (as co-author)
- Gorilla Suit (1997)
- Generation Queer: A Gay Man's Quest For Hope, Love & Justice
- Prime: The Complete Guide to Being Fit, Looking Good, Feeling Great (2002)

== Photography books of Bob Paris ==
- Duo by Herb Ritts
- Bob & Rod by Tom Bianchi

== Bodybuilding career ==
As an amateur:

- 1981 NPC Mr. Los Angeles, (Los Angeles, California), Light-heavyweight class and Overall: 1st
- 1982 NPC Mr. Southern California (Pasadena, California), Light-heavyweight class and Overall: 1st
- 1982 NPC California Muscle Classic (Pasadena, California), Light-heavyweight class and Overall: 1st
- 1982 NPC Mr. California (San Jose, California), Light-heavyweight class: 2nd
- 1982 NPC American National Championships [Mr. America] (New York City), Heavyweight class: 3rd
- 1983 NPC National Championships [Mr. America] (San Jose, California), Heavyweight class and Overall: 1st
- 1983 IFBB World Championships [Mr. Universe and professional qualifier] (Singapore), Heavyweight class and Overall: 1st

As a professional:

IFBB Mr. Olympia:

- 1984 (New York City): 7th
- 1985 (Brussels, Belgium): 9th
- 1988 (Los Angeles, California): 10th
- 1989 (Rimini, Italy): 14th
- 1991 (Orlando, Florida): 12th

Additional professional competition highlights:

- 1988 IFBB Niagara Falls Grand Prix (Niagara Falls, New York): 3rd
- 1988 IFBB Night of Champions (New York City): 3rd
- 1988 IFBB Spanish Grand Prix (Madrid, Spain): 4th
- 1988 IFBB Italian Grand Prix (Bergamo, Italy): 3rd
- 1989 IFBB Arnold Schwarzenegger Classic (Columbus, Ohio): 5th
- 1989 IFBB World Professional Championship (Surfers Paradise, Australia): 3rd
- 1991 IFBB Montreal Grand Prix (Montreal, Quebec): 3rd

(NPC = National Physique Committee / IFBB = International Federation of BodyBuilders)
