= Jusup Wilkosz =

German bodybuilder (1948–2019)

Jusup Wilkosz (8 November 1948 – 19 November 2019) was a Greek-German bodybuilder. He competed in weightlifting before turning to bodybuilding. In the mid-1970s, Wilkosz trained with Arnold Schwarzenegger.

Several injuries forced him to end his career before reaching his potential peak. In 1994 Jusup Wilkosz intended to prepare for the Mr. Olympia Masters, but was stopped by injuries again.

In spring 2007, a semi-fictional novel about Wilkosz's life was published in Germany with the title Was bleibt. Die Reise des Jusup W. (English "What remains: The Journey of Jusup W."). It leads the reader back to the 1970s and 1980s, a time often considered the golden age of bodybuilding.

== Stats ==
- Height: 6 ft 2 in
- Weight: 260 lb

== Titles ==
- 1979 German Bodybuilding Championships - 1st
- 1979 World Amateur Championships - 1st
- 1979 IFBB Mr. Universe - 1st
- 1980 IFBB Pro Mr. Universe - 1st
- 1981 Mr. Olympia - 6th
- 1982 Mr. Olympia - 10th
- 1983 Mr. Olympia - 6th
- 1983 Grand Prix Switzerland - 4th
- 1983 Grand Prix Sweden - 3rd
- 1983 Grand Prix World - 3rd
- 1984 Mr. Olympia - 3rd
- 1986 Mr. Olympia - 12th

== Videos ==
- "Der Wille, die Kraft, der Sieg" - a workout video

== Books ==
"Was bleibt - Die Reise des Jusup W." by Heiger Ostertag

== See also ==
- List of male professional bodybuilders
- List of female professional bodybuilders
