= Bertil Fox =

British bodybuilder (born 1951)

- Professional bodybuilder

Personal info
- Nickname: Brutal
- Born: 5 January 1951 (age 75); St. Kitts

Best statistics
- Height: 5 ft 8 in (1.73 m)
- Weight: 245 lb (111 kg)

Professional (Pro) career
- Pro-debut: Mr. Universe; 1978
- Best win: IFBB Mr. Olympia 5th place; 1983
- Active: Retired 1995

Bertil Fox (born 5 January 1951) is a British former International Federation of BodyBuilders professional bodybuilder and convicted murderer. He was pardoned for that crime by the Governor General of Saint Kitts and Nevis on 4 August 2022.

== Biography ==
Born 5 January 1951, on the eastern Caribbean island of St. Kitts, Fox emigrated to London, England, with his family when he was one year old. He then moved to Northampton. He did not return to St. Kitts for more than 40 years. He once said, "I'm 100% British. I think, I act and talk like an Englishman, not like someone from the West Indies."

Encouraged by a cousin to take up bodybuilding, Fox won the 1969 Junior Mr. Britain at 18. He went on to win nearly every major bodybuilding contest outside of the IFBB, including the 1976 AAU Mr. World, the amateur 1977 NABBA Mr. Universe and the professional NABBA Mr. Universe in 1978 and 1979. Before turning Professional, Fox worked as a train driver on the London Underground. Joe Weider sponsored Fox's move to Los Angeles in 1981, and he competed in IFBB contests for the next 13 years. Bill Reynolds, then Flex magazine editor-in-chief, gave Fox the nickname "Brutal Bertil" for his high-volume and extremely heavy training.

Fox placed second in two IFBB shows – the 1982 Night of Champions and the 1983 Swiss Grand Prix (beating Lee Haney) and he finished fifth in the 1983 Mr. Olympia (his second of five Mr. O appearances). He competed in 12 IFBB shows from 1984 to 1994. Retiring from the stage, he returned to St. Kitts for the first time since 1952, to open Fox's Gym in the summer of 1995.

== Murder conviction ==
On 30 September 1997, in St. Kitts and Nevis, 20-year-old beauty queen Leyoca Browne and her mother, 36-year-old Violet Browne, were fatally shot by Fox, then 46. Fox, who previously had been engaged to Leyoca, was arrested and charged with the murders. On 22 May 1998, Fox was convicted of murder of the two women. He was originally sentenced to death by hanging, but after an appeal to the Judicial Committee of the Privy Council, his sentence was changed to life in prison. On 4 August 2022, Fox was pardoned by the Governor General of St. Kitts and Nevis after serving 25 years and is now a free man living in the UK.

== Competition record ==
1969
Mr Britain – NABBA, Junior, 1st
1970
Mr Britain – NABBA, Junior, 1st
1971
Mr Britain – NABBA, Junior, 1st
Mr Europe, Junior, 1st
1976
Mr Britain – NABBA, Winner
Mr Europe, Medium, 1st
Mr Europe, Overall Winner
Mr Universe – NABBA, Medium, 2nd
Mr World – AAU, Winner
Mr World – AAU, Most Muscular, 1st
Mr World – AAU, Medium, 1st
1977
Mr Universe – NABBA, Medium, 1st
Mr Universe – NABBA, Overall Winner
1978
Universe – Pro – NABBA, Winner
1979
Universe – Pro – NABBA, Winner
1980
World Championships – WABBA, Professional, 2nd
1981
Grand Prix Belgium – IFBB, 5th
1982
Night of Champions – IFBB, 2nd
Olympia – IFBB, 8th
1983
Grand Prix Sweden – IFBB, 4th
Grand Prix Switzerland – IFBB, 2nd
Olympia – IFBB, 5th
1984
World Pro Championships – IFBB, 5th
1986
Olympia – IFBB, 7th
1987
Grand Prix Germany – IFBB, 9th
Night of Champions – IFBB, 7th
Olympia – IFBB, 12th
1989
Arnold Classic – IFBB, 6th
Grand Prix Melbourne – IFBB, 6th
Olympia – IFBB, 11th
World Pro Championships – IFBB, 5th
1992
Arnold Classic – IFBB, 16th
Pittsburgh Pro Invitational – IFBB, 9th
1994
Ironman Pro Invitational – IFBB, 13th

== See also ==
- List of male professional bodybuilders
- List of female professional bodybuilders
- Mr. Olympia
