= Flex (magazine) =

American bodybuilding magazine

- Cover of the November 2007 edition
- Editorial Director: Zack Zeigler
- Categories: Bodybuilding
- Frequency: Monthly
- Total circulation: 77,180 (2011) (December 2011)
- First issue: April 1983
- Final issue: May 2018
- Company: JW Media
- Country: US
- Based in: New York City
- Language: English
- Website: www.flexonline.com
- ISSN: 8750-8915

Flex was an American bodybuilding magazine published by American Media, Inc.

== History ==
Founded in 1983 by Canadian entrepreneur Joe Weider, local versions (essentially the U.S. content with local advertisements) are now published throughout the world, in countries such as the UK and Australia. The premier issue was dated April 1983, and featured Chris Dickerson on the cover. Flex centers more on "hardcore" and professional bodybuilding, as opposed to its companion publication Muscle & Fitness, which has a more mainstream fitness focus.

American Media purchased the Mr. Olympia event, as well as the Flex, Muscle & Fitness, and Muscle & Fitness Hers titles in 2003.

In March 2018 it was announced that Flex magazine would merge with Muscle & Fitness to become one magazine. Flex also combined with the Muscle & Fitness website as well. The last print issue was published in May 2018.

In February 2020, longtime bodybuilding enthusiast Jake Wood acquired Flex, Muscle & Fitness, and Muscle & Fitness media brands and Joe Weider's Olympia Fitness & Performance Weekend from American Media (now A360 Media).
