= Lee Labrada =

American bodybuilder

Lee Labrada is an American professional bodybuilder, author, fitness trainer, and CEO of Labrada Nutrition. He won the Mr. Universe title in 1985 and placed in the top four for seven consecutive years in Mr. Olympia. In 2002, at the request of the city of Houston, Labrada launched the "Get Lean Houston" campaign to combat the city's obesity problem.

In 2004, Labrada was inducted into the International Federation of BodyBuilding and Fitness Hall of Fame. In 2005, he published the fitness book The Lean Body Promise. He has founded his own company, Labrada Nutrition, selling nutritional supplements.

His son, Hunter Labrada, is also a bodybuilder.

== Publications ==
- The Lean Body Promise, 2005. HarperCollins. ISBN 978-0-06-059371-1

== See also ==
- List of male professional bodybuilders
- List of female professional bodybuilders
