= Albert Beckles =

British bodybuilder (1930–2026)

Al Beckles
- Born: 14 July 1930; Barbados
- Died: 16 May 2026 (aged 95)
- Occupation: Bodybuilder

Albert Beckles (14 July 1930 – 16 May 2026) was a Barbadian-born British IFBB pro bodybuilder and Mr. Universe. He was a three-time New York City ‘Night of Champions’ winner. Beckles was celebrated for being competitive at the top level in his fifties. He was the oldest professional male bodybuilder to win the overall of an International Federation of Bodybuilding and Fitness Professional League (IFBB Pro League) contest at the age of 60.

== Early life and bodybuilding career ==
Beckles was born on 14 July 1930 in Barbados, (Note: as stated by Albert himself on John Hansen’s Bodybuilding Legends podcast) but immigrated to London, England. In the mid-1960s, he won several British regional titles before winning the 1969 and 1970 NABBA Mr. Britain titles. In 1971, Beckles joined the IFBB, earning the overall at the IFBB "Mr. Universe."

Beckles was one of the most active participants in bodybuilding history, having been in over 100 contests. In 1982, at the age of 52, he won the Night of Champions competition in New York.

Beckles’ 13 forays into the IFBB Mr. Olympia yielded six placings among the top five, including coming second to Lee Haney in 1985 at the age of 55.

In 1991, at the age of 60, he won the Niagara Falls Pro Invitational.

== Personal life and death ==
Beckles later resided in Los Angeles. He was a "pollo-vegetarian", which means he ate poultry but no red meat.

Beckles died on 16 May 2026, at the age of 95.

== Contest history ==
YEAR	CONTEST	HEIGHT/WEIGHT CLASS	PLACING
1965	Mr. Britain NABBA		5th
1965	Universe NABBA	Medium	3rd
1966	Universe NABBA	Medium	6th
1967	Mr. Britain NABBA		3rd
1968	Mr. Britain NABBA		2nd
1969	Mr. Britain NABBA		2nd
1969	Mr. World IFBB	Medium	2nd
1969	Universe NABBA	Medium	3rd
1970	Mr. Britain NABBA		1st
1970	Mr. Europe		1st
1970	Mr. Europe	Medium	1st
1970	Universe NABBA	Medium	2nd
1971	Mr. Britain NABBA		1st
1971	Mr. World AAU		1st
1971	Mr. World AAU	Medium	1st
1971	Mr. World AAU Most Muscular		1st
1971	Universe IFBB	Medium	1st & Overall
1971	Universe NABBA	Medium	1st & Overall
1973	Mr. Europe IFBB	Medium	1st & Overall
1973	Universe IFBB	Medium	1st
1975	Olympia IFBB	Lightweight	3rd
1975	Universe IFBB	Medium	2nd
1977	Olympia IFBB	Short	4th & 7th Overall
1978	Olympia IFBB	Lightweight	8th
1979	Best in the World IFBB, Professional		3rd
1979	Grand Prix Pennsylvania IFBB		3rd
1979	Olympia IFBB	Lightweight	7th
1979	World Pro Championships IFBB		2nd
1980	Universe Pro IFBB		4th
1980	World Pro Championships IFBB		4th
1981	Canada Pro Cup IFBB		2nd
1981	Grand Prix Belgium IFBB		2nd
1981	Grand Prix California IFBB		4th
1981	Grand Prix Louisiana IFBB		2nd
1981	Grand Prix Massachusetts IFBB		2nd
1981	Grand Prix New England IFBB		1st
1981	Grand Prix New York IFBB		2nd
1981	Grand Prix Wales IFBB		3rd
1981	Grand Prix World Cup IFBB		6th
1981	Professional World Cup IFBB		6th
1981	World Grand Prix IFBB		2nd
1982	Grand Prix Belgium IFBB		2nd
1982	Grand Prix Sweden IFBB		4th
1982	Night Of Champions IFBB		1st
1982	Olympia IFBB		5th
1982	World Pro Championships IFBB		1st
1983	Grand Prix England IFBB		5th
1983	Grand Prix Las Vegas IFBB		3rd
1983	Grand Prix Portland IFBB		4th
1983	Grand Prix Sweden IFBB		5th
1983	Grand Prix Switzerland IFBB		5th
1983	Night Of Champions IFBB		3rd
1983	Olympia IFBB		7th
1984	Canada Pro Cup IFBB		1st
1984	Olympia IFBB		4th
1984	World Grand Prix IFBB		1st
1984	World Pro Championships IFBB		1st
1985	Night Of Champions IFBB		1st
1985	Olympia IFBB		2nd
1986	Olympia IFBB		4th
1987	Grand Prix France IFBB		4th
1987	Grand Prix Germany (2) IFBB		6th
1987	Grand Prix Germany IFBB		4th
1987	Olympia IFBB		7th
1987	World Pro Championships IFBB		3rd
1988	Chicago Pro Invitational IFBB		4th
1988	Grand Prix England IFBB		7th
1988	Grand Prix France IFBB		11th
1988	Grand Prix Germany IFBB		8th
1988	Grand Prix Italy IFBB		8th
1988	Grand Prix Spain (2) IFBB		8th
1988	Grand Prix Spain IFBB		7th
1988	Night Of Champions IFBB		5th
1988	Olympia IFBB		15th
1988	World Pro Championships IFBB		10th
1989	Arnold Classic IFBB		7th
1989	Grand Prix England IFBB		9th
1989	Grand Prix Finland IFBB		9th
1989	Grand Prix France IFBB		9th
1989	Grand Prix Holland IFBB		11th
1989	Grand Prix Melbourne IFBB		4th
1989	Grand Prix Spain (2) IFBB		10th
1989	Grand Prix Spain IFBB		10th
1989	Grand Prix Sweden IFBB		9th
1989	Grand Prix US Pro IFBB		4th
1989	Night of Champions IFBB		8th
1989	Olympia IFBB		15th
1989	World Pro Championships IFBB		4th
1990	Arnold Classic IFBB		9th
1990	Houston Pro Invitatinal IFBB		11th
1990	Niagara Falls Pro Invitatinal IFBB		12th
1990	Night of Champions IFBB		DID NOT PLACE
1991	Grand Prix Denmark IFBB		7th
1991	Grand Prix England IFBB		7th
1991	Grand Prix Finland IFBB		9th
1991	Grand Prix Italy IFBB		8th
1991	Grand Prix Spain IFBB		9th
1991	Grand Prix Switzerland IFBB		8th
1991	Niagara Falls Pro Invitational IFBB		1st
1991	Night of Champions IFBB		7th
1991	Olympia IFBB		DID NOT PLACE
1991	Pittsburg Pro Invitational IFBB		12th
1991	San Jose Pro Invitational IFBB		5th
1992	Chicago Pro Invitational IFBB		16th
1992	Niagara Falls Pro Invitational IFBB		8th

== See also ==
- Betty Pariso (oldest professional female bodybuilder to win an International Federation of Bodybuilding and Fitness Professional League (IFBB Pro League) contest)
- Shawn Rhoden (oldest Mr. Olympia overall (OA) winner)
- Frank Zane (oldest Mr. Olympia lightweight)
- Ken Waller (oldest Mr. Olympia heavyweight)
- Dexter Jackson (oldest Arnold Classic OA winner)
- Fred Smalls (oldest Arnold Classic best poser award winner)
- Roelly Winklaar (oldest Arnold Classic most muscular award winner)
- Don Youngblood (oldest Masters Olympia OA winner)
- Honore Cironte (oldest Masters Olympia over 60 winner)
- Robby Robinson (oldest Masters Olympia over 50 winner)
