= Muscle worship =

Pronounced sexual activity involving muscles

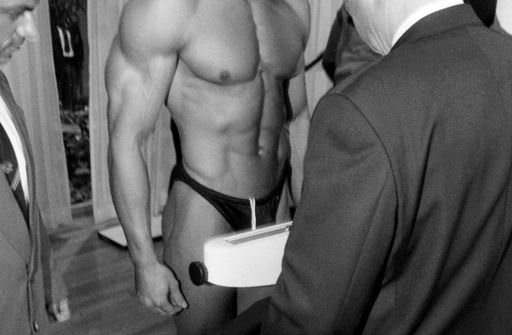
Men weighing a German bodybuilder before a competition (1995) by Andreas Bohnenstengel. Bodybuilding competitions are akin to a form of muscle worship, as the bodybuilder exposes their body for an audience.

Muscle worship (also called sthenolagnia) is a form of body worship (or sexual fetishism) in which one participant, the worshiper, touches the muscles of another participant, the dominant, in a sexually arousing manner. The practice of muscle worship can involve various wrestling holds and lifts, as well as the rubbing, massaging, kissing, or licking of a dominant's body. Although muscle worship participants may be of any gender or sexual orientation, the dominant (often a professional bodybuilder, fitness competitor, or wrestler) is almost always an individual with either a large body size or a high degree of visible muscle mass, while the worshiper is often, but not always, skinnier or smaller.

== Background ==
The Encyclopedia of Unusual Sex Practices lists sthenolagnia ("sexual arousal from displaying strength or muscles") and cratolagnia ("arousal from strength") as paraphilias associated with the practice of wrestling for erotic purpose, although there have been no studies concerning them. Forensic and Medico-Legal Aspects of Sexual Crimes and Unusual Sexual Practices, the 2008 comprehensive monograph of Anil Aggrawal, only defines the two terms, and does not provide any additional information.

As with many BDSM-related practices, the amount of force and pain involved depends on the desires of the participants. While some dominants might use their size and strength to pin a smaller worshiper, thereby forcing that worshiper to come in contact with the dominant's muscles, others might only display their muscles and allow a worshiper to touch them. People who participate in muscle worship generally find the practice sexually arousing, but some male bodybuilders offer muscle worship sessions only for monetary gain, as bodybuilding does not always guarantee a steady income. For well-known competitors, this can also draw in fans who want a chance to meet with and touch the muscles of bodybuilders whom they idolize.

Muscle worship is a fetish among some gay men, giving rise to a number of websites that display bodybuilders posing for admirers and offering private online posing shows. There are also sites devoted to women who enjoy worshiping male bodybuilders. Many other sites are oriented towards straight men and lesbian women who enjoy worshipping female bodybuilders and other fit, muscular women, either virtually or by arranging for in-person sessions.

"It pays well, and many guys are either doing it right now or have done it in the past. Even Arnold Schwarzenegger was rumored to be into this shit."

— Bodybuilder Gregg Valentino about muscle worship.

In his book Death, Drugs, and Muscle: Surviving the Steroid Underworld, bodybuilder Gregg Valentino called muscle worship a "taboo subject in the world of muscle," and noted that Arnold Schwarzenegger might have participated in muscle worship sessions in the past.

In her master's thesis, Margaret Bourke-White considered Wilkie Collins' Man and Wife (1870) "a satire on muscle worship," as Collins criticized the excessive "glorification in England...of the mere physical qualities which an Englishman shares with the savage and the brute...[t]he manhood and muscles of England resemble the wool and mutton of England..." Therefore, muscle worship has also been used in reference to athletocracy, the preference of coaches towards elite athletes, as Arnold Lunn condemned the "school tradition of muscle worship" his novel The Harrovians (1913).

In a similar vein of criticism, Kōbō Abe's The Ark Sakura (1984) contains a quarry, populated in part, by the Olympic Prevention League who shout "Down with muscle-worship!" Another critic, Jean-Marie Brohm, holds that muscle worship is part of the "dominant ideology of sport, writing "[a]ll the values of the capitalist jungle are played out in sport: virility, sexual athleticism, physical dominance, the superman, muscle worship, fascistic male chauvinism, racism, sexism etc."

Dance critic John Martin maintained that late-19th century dance focused on muscle culture, when "[e]very boy wanted to be a Sandow, and the muscle that was somehow of primary importance was the biceps." Martin further derided that "when certain spectacular muscles are developed to inordinate size they merely interefere with movement and the body becomes muscle bound." In researching for his 2002 book, Skipping Towards Gomorrah, Dan Savage received an advance from eventual publisher Dutton to explore the seven deadly sins, which included paying "a male escort with a body like an SUV whose specialty was "muscle worship" and who liked having his feet kissed for $500 an hour."

In the documentary Supersize She, Joanna Thomas said she could not be a professional bodybuilder and work a job, which is why she had a members only subscription website. One of her photographers said that the people on her website were "attracted to large biceps and vascularity, the veins. It's all about the movement and it's all about the muscles swelling and blood flowing though the muscles."

== See also ==
- Akinwale Arobieke
- Amazons
- Bara (genre)
- Female bodybuilding
- Foxy boxing
- Macrophilia
- Session wrestler
- Strongwoman
