= 2005 Mr. Olympia =

Men's Bodybuilding Contest 2005

The 2005 Mr. Olympia contest was an IFBB professional bodybuilding competition and the feature event of Joe Weider's 2005 Olympia Weekend held October 15, 2005 at the Orleans Arena in Las Vegas, Nevada.

== Results ==
The total prize amount given during the exhibition was $711,000, an increase of 32% from 2004. The total prize money for the men's Mr. Olympia was $550,000.

Place	Prize	Name	Country	1	2	3	4	Points
1	$150,000	Ronnie Coleman	(United States)	7	5	5	5	22
2	$85,000	Jay Cutler	(United States)	8	10	10	10	38
3	$55,000	Gustavo Badell	(Venezuela)	21	19	16	15	71
4	$45,000	Günter Schlierkamp	(Germany)	20	16	19	20	75
5	$35,000	Víctor Martínez	(Dominican Republic)	22	25	26	25	98
6	$27,000	Dennis James	(Germany)	31	32	37		100
7	$16,000	Melvin Anthony	(United States)	31	40	31		102
8	$15,000	Branch Warren	(United States)	46	35	40		121
9	$14,000	Darrem Charles	(Trinidad and Tobago)	40	50	46		136
10	$12,000	Mustafa Mohammad	(Jordan)	57	50	48		155
11	$2,000	Johnnie O. Jackson	(United States)	59	51	52		162
12	$2,000	George Farah	(Lebanon)	60	61	61		182
13	$2,000	Chris Cormier	(United States)	51	73	67		191
14	$2,000	David Henry	(United States)	71	64	66		201
15	$2,000	Markus Rühl	(Germany)	69	75	68		212
16	$2,000	Kris Dim	(United States)	77	78			155
16	$2,000	Craig Richardson	(United States)	79	80			159
16	$2,000	Ronny Rockel	(Germany)	80	79			159
16	$2,000	Quincy Taylor	(United States)	80	80			160
16	$2,000	Aleksandr Fyodorov	(Russia)	80	80			160
16	$2,000	Mike Sheridan	(United Kingdom)	80	80			160

== Notable events ==
- Ronnie Coleman wins his eighth consecutive Mr. Olympia title, tying with Lee Haney for most wins
- Gustavo Badell won $25,000 in the Challenge Round when he defeated Coleman by one point in a pose-off. This round (which did not impact the final scores) was judged by five previous Mr. Olympia winners and had a total purse of $50,000. Only the top five competed, and each challenged others to one pose comparisons.
- Jay Cutler won $10.000 in the Vyo Tech's Best Wheels.

== See also ==
- 2005 Ms. Olympia
