= 2003 Mr. Olympia =

Bodybuilding competition in Las Vegas

The 2003 Mr. Olympia contest was an IFBB professional bodybuilding competition held October 22–26, 2003 at the Mandalay Bay Arena in Las Vegas, Nevada.

== Results ==
For the fifth year in a row, the total prize money for the Mr. Olympia weekend was increased, reaching a level of $404,000 with the winner taking home $110,000 and a Cadillac Escalade provided by Pinnacle Supplements.

| Place | Prize | Name | Country | 1 | 2 | 3 | 4 | Points |
|---|---|---|---|---|---|---|---|---|
| 1 | $110,000 | Ronnie Coleman | (United States) | 5 | 5 | 5 | 5 | 20 |
| 2 | $75,000 | Jay Cutler | (United States) | 10 | 10 | 10 | 10 | 40 |
| 3 | $50,000 | Dexter Jackson | (United States) | 16 | 15 | 15 | 16 | 62 |
| 4 | $40,000 | Dennis James | (Germany) | 19 | 20 | 21 | 20 | 80 |
| 5 | $30,000 | Günter Schlierkamp | (Germany) | 25 | 25 | 23 | 25 | 98 |
| 6 | $25,000 | Kevin Levrone | (United States) | 30 | 30 | 30 | 30 | 120 |
| 7 | $15,000 | Darrem Charles | (Trinidad and Tobago) | 35 | 40 | 39 | 35 | 149 |
| 8 | $14,000 | Troy Alves | (United States) | 41 | 36 | 37 | 35 | 149 |
| 9 | $12,000 | Melvin Anthony | (United States) | 45 | 41 | 39 | 35 | 160 |
| 10 | $10,000 | Ernie Taylor | (United Kingdom) | 53 | 50 | 51 | 35 | 189 |
| 11 | $5,000 | Johnnie O. Jackson | (United States) | 53 | 58 | 55 | 35 | 201 |
| 12 | $4,000 | Rodney St. Cloud | (United States) | 58 | 64 | 60 | 35 | 217 |
| 13 | $2,000 | Art Atwood | (United States) | 68 | 60 | 65 | 35 | 228 |
| 14 | $2,000 | Claude Groulx | (Canada) | 72 | 73 | 69 | 35 | 249 |
| 15 | $2,000 | Lee Priest | (Australia) | 71 | 77 | 75 | 35 | 258 |
| 16 | $2,000 | Jonathan Davie | (Australia) | 80 | 75 | 76 | 35 | 266 |

== Notable events ==
- Ronnie Coleman won his sixth consecutive Mr. Olympia title
- Chris Cormier pulled out of the Olympia due to sickness, although he was at the press conference
- Art Atwood and Kevin Levrone both competed despite experiencing injuries during their training
- Arnold Schwarzenegger made a special guest appearance
- Franco Columbu received two special awards from the IFBB and was quoted "I'm happy that I got two awards and Arnold got nothing"
- Lee Haney, the man who broke Arnold's record of seven Mr. Olympia titles received a special lifetime achievement award from the IFBB and FLEX Magazine

== See also ==
- 2003 Ms. Olympia
