= Body worship =

Submissive act pertaining to BDSM

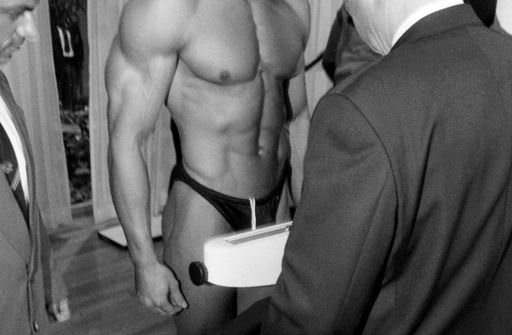
Men weighing a German bodybuilder before a competition (1995) by Andreas Bohnenstengel. Bodybuilding competitions are akin to a form of muscle worship, as the bodybuilder exposes their body for an audience.

Body worship is the practice of physically revering a part of another person's body, and is usually done as a submissive act in the context of BDSM. It is often an expression of erotic fetishism but it can also be used as part of service-oriented submission or sexual roleplay. It typically involves kissing, licking or sucking parts of a dominant's body such as the vulva, the penis, the buttocks, the feet, the breasts or the muscles. Body worship was included in the introductory classes on BDSM introduced in 2003 by the Society of Janus, the largest BDSM educational organisation in San Francisco.

Dominatrices sometimes use body worship as part of dominance and submission. This may involve a submissive stroking, massaging or bathing the dominatrix or kissing and licking her buttocks. In addition, the submissive may be required to perform cunnilingus (sometimes called "full-body worship") or anilingus on her. These activities may take place during facesitting (sometimes called "queening"), in which the dominatrix sits on the submissive's face. A muscle worship fetish may be catered for by a dominatrix who is also a bodybuilder.

== See also ==
- Boot worship
- Breast fetishism
- Buttock fetishism
- Foot fetishism
- Hand fetishism
- Partialism
