= 2004 Mr. Olympia =

Professional bodybuilding competition

The 2004 Mr. Olympia contest was an International Federation of BodyBuilders professional bodybuilding competition and the feature event of Joe Weider's 2004 Olympia Weekend, held October 30 and 31, 2004, at the Mandalay Bay Arena in Las Vegas, Nevada.

== Results ==
This Mr. Olympia contest introduced a new Challenge Round to determine the final standings for the top six. Each bodybuilder in the top six challenge each other top-sixer to one of the eight compulsory poses, trying to highlight his strengths and/or expose his opponents weaknesses. Only 21 points carried over for those six from the first three rounds (6 for 1st place, 5 for 2nd place, 4 for 3rd place, 3 for 2nd place, 1 for 6th place). Then, each pose challenge was worth two points to the winner for a total of 50 points.

The total prize money for men was $400,000.

Ronnie Coleman won his seventh consecutive Mr. Olympia title. Jay Cutler, for a third time, placed runner-up. Although he placed third in traditional scoring, Dexter Jackson lost to Gustavo Badell in the final challenge round, for a prize difference of $10,000.

Place	Prize	Name	Country	1	2	3	Points	Challenge Score
1	$120,000	Ronnie Coleman	(United States)	5	5	5	15	24
2	$75,000	Jay Cutler	(United States)	10	10	10	30	21
3	$50,000	Gustavo Badell	(Venezuela)	21	16	20	57	13
4	$40,000	Dexter Jackson	(United States)	15	19	15	49	12
5	$30,000	Markus Rühl	(Germany)	40	28	25	93	10
6	$25,000	Günter Schlierkamp	(Germany)	28	43	30	101	1
7	$15,000	Chris Cormier	(United States)	36	34	39	109	
8	$14,000	Dennis James	(Germany)	33	37	42	112	
9	$12,000	Víctor Martínez	(Dominican Republic)	37	35	46	118	
10	$10,000	Darrem Charles	(Trinidad and Tobago)	50	49	43	142	
11	$1,000	Pavol Jablonický	(Czech Republic)	57	63	58	178	
12	$1,000	Kris Dim	(United States)	60	61	63	184	
13	$1,000	Ahmad Haidar	(Lebanon)	67	60	64	191	
14	$1,000	Johnnie O. Jackson	(United States)	79	70	69	218	
15	$1,000	Troy Alves	(United States)	72	71	76	219	
16	$1,000	Craig Richardson	(United States)	71	82	82	235	
17	$1,000	Mustafa Mohammad	(Jordan)	85	85	84	254	
18	$1,000	Richard Jones	(United States)	91	91	89	271	
19	$1,000	Claude Groulx	(Canada)	93	91	95	279	

== See also ==
- 2004 Ms. Olympia
