= 2004 Ms. Olympia =

Women's professional bodybuilding competition

- Promotion: IFBB
- Date: October 29, 2004
- Venue: Mandalay Bay Arena
- City: Paradise, Nevada, United States

Event chronology
2003 Ms. Olympia	2004 Ms. Olympia	2005 Ms. Olympia

The 2004 Ms. Olympia contest is an IFBB professional bodybuilding competition and part of Joe Weider's Olympia Fitness & Performance Weekend 2004 that was held on October 29, 2004, at the Mandalay Bay Arena in Paradise, Nevada. It was the 25th Ms. Olympia competition held. Other events at the exhibition include the Mr. Olympia, Fitness Olympia, and Figure Olympia contests.

== Prize money ==
- Overall - $10,000
- 1st (Lightweight (LW)) - $10,000
- 1st (Heavyweight (HW)) - $10,000
- 2nd (LW) - $6,000
- 2nd (HW) - $6,000
- 3rd (LW) - $4,000
- 3rd (HW) - $4,000
- 4th (LW) - $3,000
- 4th (HW) - $3,000
- 5th (LW) - $2,000
- 5th (HW) - $2,000

Total: $60,000

== Rounds ==
- Round 1 (Symmetry Round): Judging the balance and proportion of the contestants' physiques.
- Round 2 (Muscularity/Conditioning Round): Focused on muscle size, definition, and overall conditioning, including leanness and muscle separation.
- Round 3 (Compulsory Poses Round): Contestants performed mandatory poses to highlight specific muscle groups.
- Round 4 (Posedown Round): Contestants presented a choreographed routine to music, emphasizing creativity, presentation, and overall stage presence.

== Weight-in ==
Heavyweights over 135 pounds:

- Yaxeni Oriquen-Garcia - 165 lb (75 kg)
- Betty Pariso - 165 lb (75 kg)
- Bonny Priest - 165 lb (75 kg)
- Betty Viana-Adkins - 160 lb (73 kg)
- Lisa Aukland - 155 lb (70 kg)
- Lenda Murray - 153 lb (69 kg)
- Iris Kyle - N/A (missed the weigh-in)

Lightweights up to 135 pounds:

- Marja Lehtonen - 135 lb (61 kg)
- Desiree Ellis - 134 lb (61 kg)
- Vilma Caez - 134 lb (61 kg)
- Joanna Thomas - 134 lb (61 kg)
- Valentina Chepiga - 133 lb (60 kg)
- Nancy Lewis - 133 lb (60 kg)
- Mah Ann Mendoza - 132 lb (60 kg)
- Denise Masino - 131 lb (59 kg)
- Dayana Cadeau - 129 lb (59 kg)

== Numerical order of contestants ==
No	NAME	COUNTRY
Lightweights up to 135 pounds
1	Marja Lehtonen	Finland
2	Dayana Cadeau	Canada
3	Desiree Ellis	Canada
4	Denise Masino	USA
5	Vilma Caez	USA
6	Valentina Chepiga	Ukraine
7	Nancy Lewis	USA
8	Mah Ann Mendoza	Philippines
9	Joanna Thomas	England
Heavyweights over 135 pounds
10	Lenda Murray	USA
11	Lisa Aukland	USA
12	Yaxeni Oriquen	Venezuela
13	Betty Pariso-Carmichael	USA
14	Betty Viana	Venezuela
15	Iris Kyle	USA
16	Bonny Priest	USA

== Results ==
=== Scorecard ===
Place	Name	Country	1	2	3	4	Total
Overall Winner - Iris Kyle
Heavyweights over 135 pounds
1	Iris Kyle	USA	5	8	5	5	23
2	Lenda Murray	USA	10	7	10	10	37
3	Yaxeni Oriquen	Venezuela	15	15	15	15	60
4	Betty Pariso-Carmichael	USA	22	22	24		68
5	Betty Viana	Venezuela	23	24	24		71
6	Lisa Aukland	USA	32	30	32		94
7	Bonny Priest	USA	33	34	32		99
Lightweights up to 135 pounds
1	Dayana Cadeau	Canada	7	5	8	8	28
2	Denise Masino	USA	8	10	9	7	34
3	Marja Lehtonen	Finland	23	15	20	14	72
4	Nancy Lewis	USA	21	21	21		63
5	Desiree Ellis	Canada	22	23	22		67
6	Mah Ann Mendoza	Philippines	23	30	29		82
7	Joanna Thomas	England	37	35	40		112
8	Valentina Chepiga	Ukraine	39	41	36		116
9	Vilma Caez	USA	45	44	40		129

Comparison to previous Olympia results:

- +1 - Iris Kyle
- -1 - Lenda Murray
- Same - Yaxeni Oriquen
- +2 - Betty Pariso-Carmichael
- +1 - Betty Viana-Adkins
- +1 - Dayana Cadeau
- +1 - Denise Masino
- +2 - Nancy Lewis
- +3 - Joanna Thomas
- -6 - Valentina Chepiga

== Attended ==
- 11th Ms. Olympia attended - Lenda Murray
- 7th Ms. Olympia attended - Yaxeni Oriquen-Garcia
- 6th Ms. Olympia attended - Iris Kyle and Nancy Lewis
- 5th Ms. Olympia attended - Dayana Cadeau
- 4th Ms. Olympia attended - Fannie Barrios and Angela Debatin
- 3rd Ms. Olympia attended - Kim Harris, Betty Pariso-Carmichael, and Betty Viana-Adkins
- 2nd Ms. Olympia attended - Denise Masino and Joanna Thomas
- 1st Ms. Olympia attended - Lisa Aukland, Vilma Caez, Desiree Ellis, Marja Lehtonen, Mah Ann Mendoza, and Bonny Priest
- Previous year Olympia attendees who did not attend - Juliette Bergmann, Vickie Gates, Kim Harris, Rosemary Jennings, Helle Trevino, and Cathy LeFrançois

== Notable events ==
- Lenda Murray was dethroned of her Ms. Olympia title this year by Iris Kyle, who won her 1st Ms. Olympia. Dayana Cadeau wins her 1st lightweight Ms. Olympia title.
- This was the first Ms. Olympia since the 1980 Ms. Olympia to include lat spreads in compulsory posing routines.
- This was Lenda Murray's last Olympia before her retirement.
- The 2004 Ms. Olympia was featured in the 2005 documentary Supersize She.
- The music played during the heavyweight posedown was Move Somethin by LL Cool J, Word Up by Korn, and Frantic (instrumental) by Metallica.

== 2004 Ms. Olympia Qualified ==
#	Name	Country	How Qualified
1	Lenda Murray	(United States)	Ms. Olympia Winner
2	Juliette Bergmann	(Netherlands)	Ms. Olympia Winner
3	Valentina Chepiga	(Ukraine)	Ms. Olympia Winner
4	Andrulla Blanchette	(United Kingdom)	Ms. Olympia Winner
5	Dayana Cadeau	(Canada)	2003 Ms. Olympia LW 2nd
6	Denise Masino	(United States)	2003 Ms. Olympia LW 3rd
7	Iris Kyle	(United States)	2003 Ms. Olympia HW 2nd
8	Yaxeni Oriquen-Garcia	(Venezuela)	2003 Ms. Olympia HW 3rd
9	Sophie Duquette	(Canada)	2004 Ms. International LW 2nd
10	Betty Pariso	(United States)	2004 Ms. International HW 3rd
11	Vilma Caez	(United States)	2004 Night of Champions LW 1st
12	Marja Lehtonen	(Finland)	2004 Night of Champions LW 2nd
13	Heather Foster	(United States)	2004 Night of Champions HW 3rd
14	Mah Ann Mendoza	(Philippines)	2004 Southwest Pro LW 1st
15	Desiree Ellis	(Canada)	2004 Southwest Pro LW 2nd
16	Bonnie Priest	(United States)	2004 Southwest Pro HW 1st
17	Betty Viana-Adkins	(Venezuela)	2004 Southwest Pro HW 2nd
18	Lisa Aukland	(United States)	2004 Show of Strength HW 3rd
19	Nancy Lewis	(United States)	2004 Show of Strength LW 1st
20	Joanna Thomas	(United Kingdom)	2004 Show of Strength LW 2nd

== See also ==
- 2004 Mr. Olympia
