= Jay Cutler (bodybuilder) =

American bodybuilder (born 1973)

- Professional bodybuilder
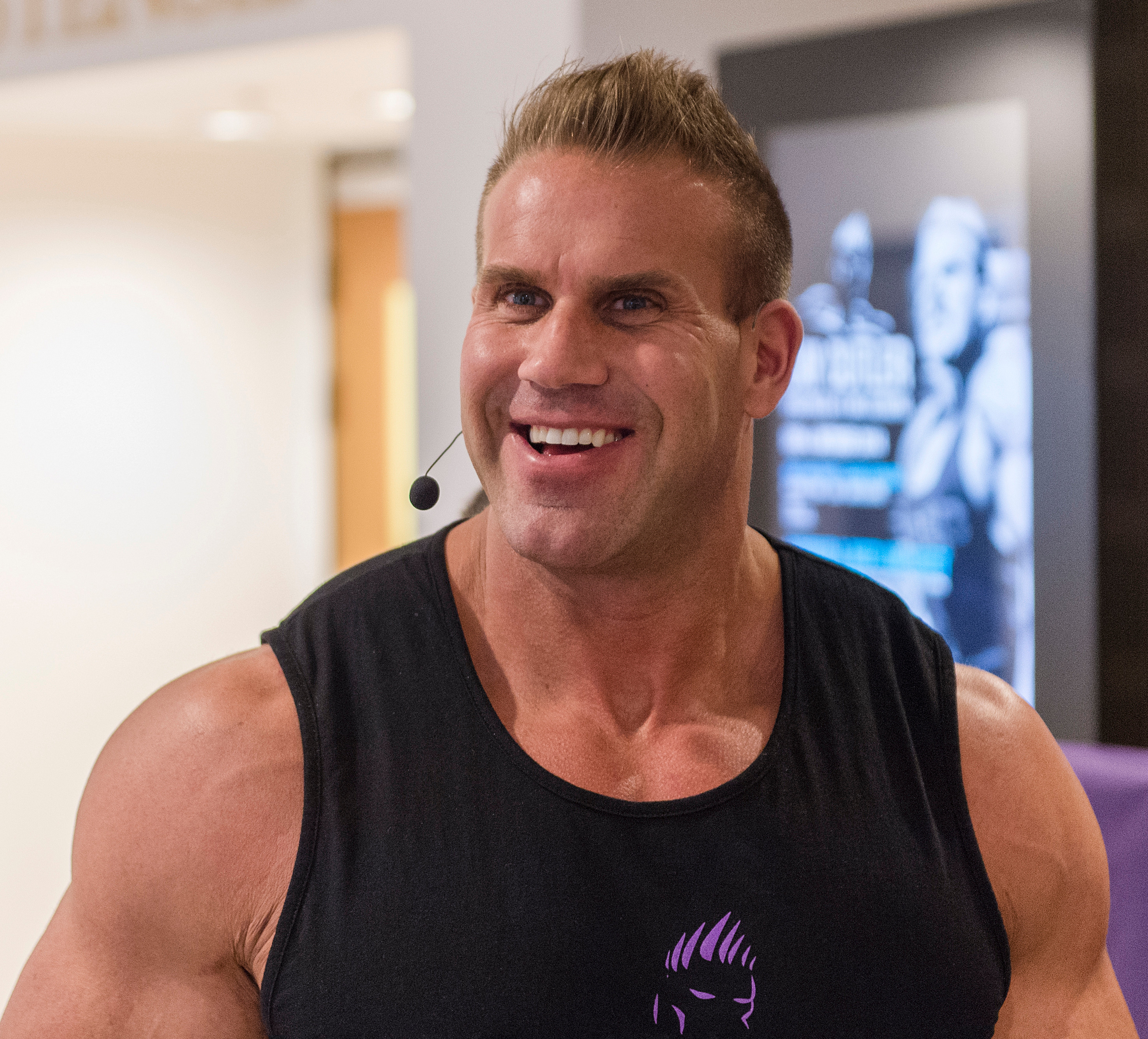
- Cutler in 2014

Personal info
- Born: August 3, 1973 (age 53); Worcester, Massachusetts, U.S.

Best statistics
- Height: 5 ft 9 in (1.75 m) or 5 ft 10 in (1.78 m)
- Weight: Contest: 260–275 lb (118–125 kg); Off season: 290–310 lb (132–141 kg)

Professional (Pro) career
- Best win: IFBB Mr. Olympia 2006–2007; 2009–2010
- Predecessor: Ronnie Coleman; Dexter Jackson
- Successor: Dexter Jackson; Phil Heath

Jason Isaac Cutler (born August 3, 1973) is an American former professional bodybuilder. An IFBB Pro League bodybuilder, Cutler is a four-time Mr. Olympia winner, having won in 2006, 2007, 2009, and 2010; and a six-time runner-up, the most in history. He also won consecutive Arnold Classic titles in 2002, 2003, and 2004. During his career, he was known for his rivalry with Ronnie Coleman. In 2021, he was inducted into the International Sports Hall of Fame.

== Early life ==
Jason Isaac Cutler was born in Worcester, Massachusetts on August 3, 1973. He grew up in nearby Sterling and attended Wachusett Regional High School in Holden. He began working in his brother's concrete construction business, Cutler Bros. Concrete, when he was 11 years old. His "first heroes" growing up were Jean-Claude Van Damme and Sylvester Stallone. He started training to be a bodybuilder at the age of 18. He graduated from Quinsigamond Community College in 1993 with a degree in criminal justice, intending to work as a corrections officer for a maximum security prison.

== Career ==
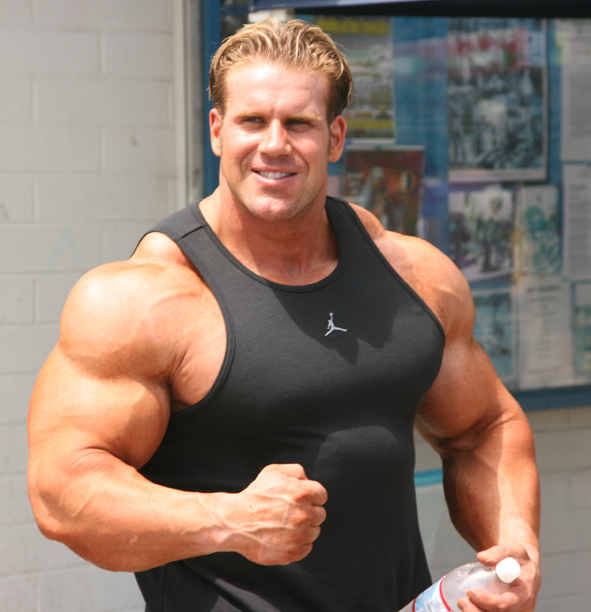
Jay Cutler at Muscle Beach 2007

Cutler was inspired to enter bodybuilding by personal trainer Marcos Rodriguez. His first contest was the 1992 Gold's Gym Worcester Bodybuilding Championships, at which he took second place. Desiring to be one of the largest competitors ever, he had his first overall win at the 1993 Iron Bodies Invitational. As he established a name for himself in the bodybuilding scene, he often appeared in bodybuilding-related videos including Battle for the Olympia 2001, a pre-contest documentary video directed by Mitsuru Okabe that highlighted many competitors as they prepared for the 2001 Mr. Olympia Competition. He went on to win consecutive Arnold Classic titles in 2002, 2003, and 2004, and placed second to Ronnie Coleman in the Mr. Olympia competition four times before claiming the title for the first time in 2006.

At the 2001 Mr. Olympia, Cutler tested positive for banned diuretics, but sued and had his second-place finish reinstated. He won the Olympia for a second consecutive year in 2007. He became the third Mr. Olympia in history (after Arnold Schwarzenegger and Franco Columbu) to win the title in non-consecutive years after defeating the reigning champion Dexter Jackson in 2009. He is the first person to win the title back after losing it. His 2009 Olympia win is also when he did his famous "quad stomp" pose. In 2010, he won his fourth Mr. Olympia title, defeating Phil Heath. In 2011, he was runner-up to Heath at the Mr. Olympia. In 2012, he was unable to compete at the Mr. Olympia due to a biceps injury. He placed sixth in the 2013 Mr. Olympia.

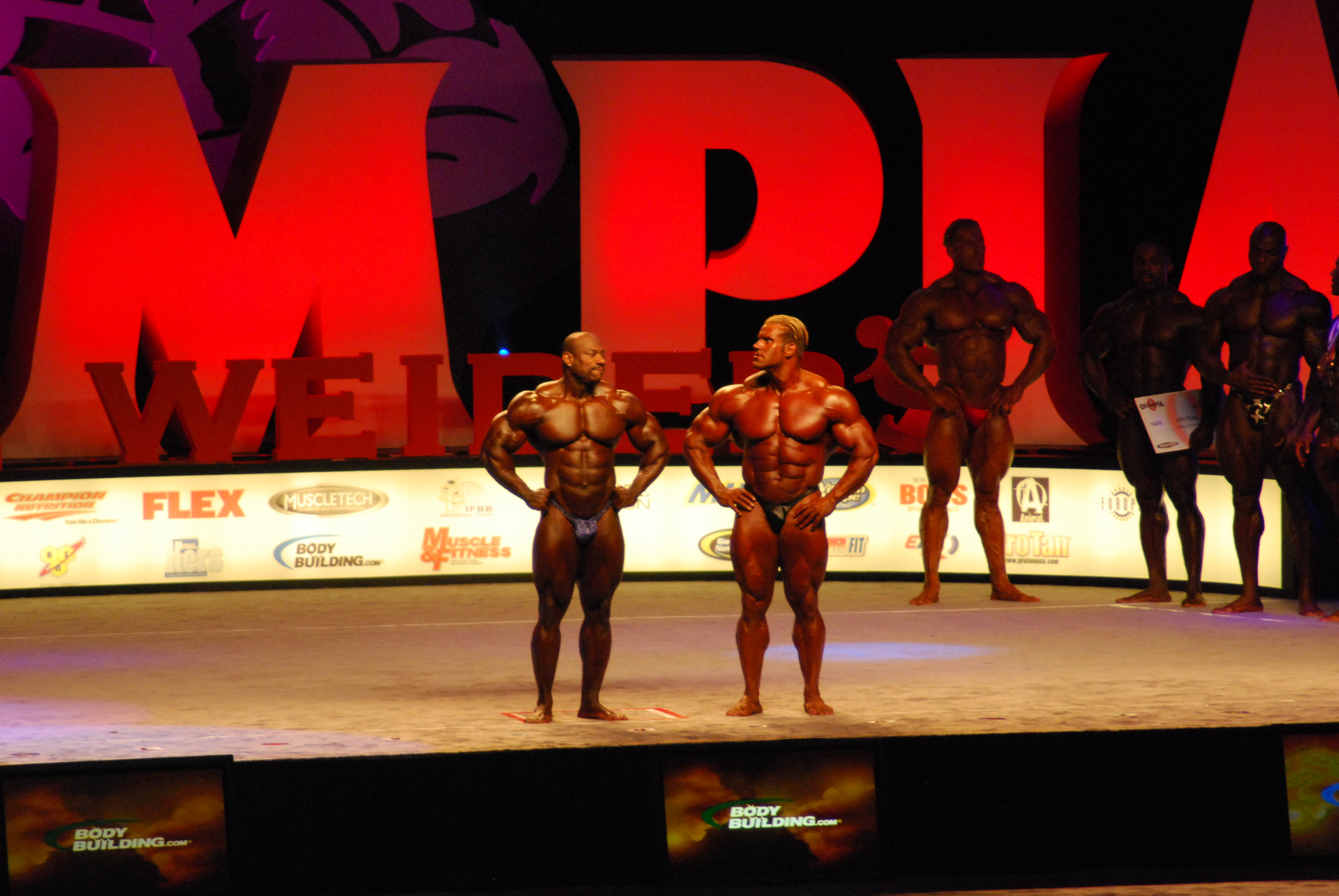
Jay Cutler at the Mr Olympia

Throughout his career, Cutler has been on the cover of fitness magazines such as Muscle & Fitness, Flex, and Muscular Development. He has not competed since 2013 and has instead focused on Cutler Nutrition, his bodybuilding supplement business, as well as other business ventures through social media. In 2021, he was inducted into the International Sports Hall of Fame.

== Stats ==
- Height: 5 ft 9 in (175 cm) or 5 ft 10 in (178 cm)
- Off-season weight: 290–310 pounds (132–141 kg)
- Competition weight: 260–275 pounds (118–125 kg)
- Upper arms: 22 in (56 cm)
- Chest: 58 in (150 cm)
- Thighs: 30 in (76 cm)
- Waist: 34 in (86 cm)
- Calves: 20 in (51 cm)

== Bodybuilding titles ==
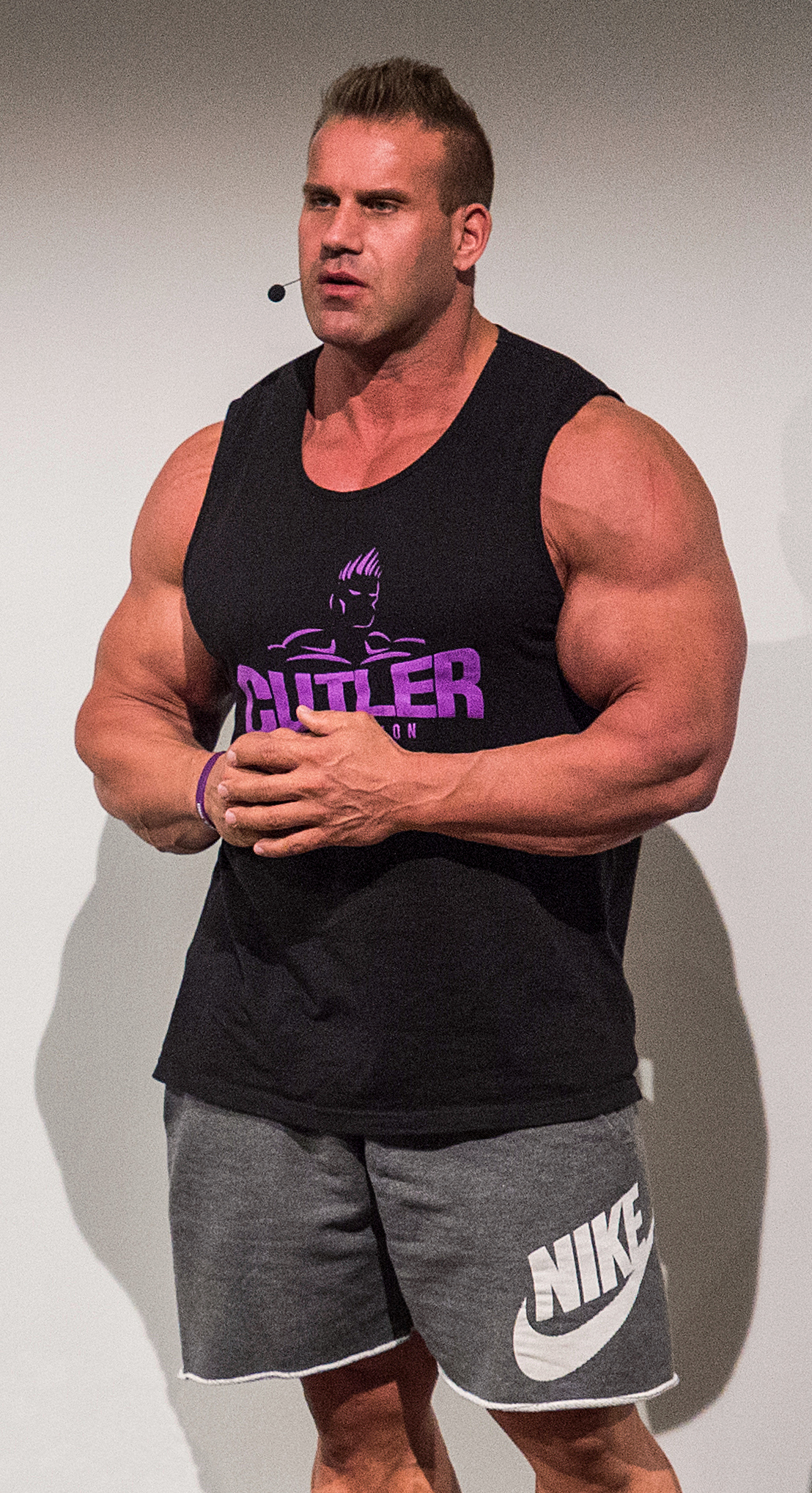
Cutler in October 2014

- 1993 NPC Iron Bodies Invitational – Teenage & Men's Heavyweight
- 1993 NPC Teen Nationals – Heavyweight
- 1995 NPC U.S. Tournament of Champions – Men's Heavyweight and Overall
- 2000 IFBB Night of Champions
- 2002 Arnold Classic
- 2003 Arnold Classic
- 2003 Ironman Pro Invitational
- 2003 San Francisco Pro Invitational
- 2003 Dutch Grand Prix
- 2003 British Grand Prix
- 2004 Arnold Classic
- 2006 Austrian Grand Prix
- 2006 Romanian Grand Prix
- 2006 Dutch Grand Prix
- 2006 Mr. Olympia
- 2007 Mr. Olympia
- 2009 Mr. Olympia
- 2010 Mr. Olympia

== Competitive placings ==
Competition	1999	2000	2001	2002	2003	2004	2005	2006	2007	2008	2009	2010	2011	2012	2013	SR
Mr. Olympia	14th	8th	2nd	A	2nd	2nd	2nd	1st	1st	2nd	1st	1st	2nd	A	6th	4 / 13

- 1992 Gold Gym Worcester Bodybuilding Championships – 2nd
- 1996 NPC Nationals, 1st place Heavyweight (earned IFBB pro card)
- 1998 IFBB Night of Champions – 11th
- 1999 Arnold Schwarzenegger Classic – 4th
- 1999 IFBB Ironman Pro Invitational – 3rd
- 1999 Mr. Olympia – 14th
- 2000 English Grand Prix – 2nd
- 2000 Joe Weider's World Pro Cup – 2nd
- 2000 Mr. Olympia – 8th
- 2000 Mr. Olympia Rome – 2nd
- 2001 Mr. Olympia – 2nd
- 2003 Mr. Olympia – 2nd
- 2003 Russian Grand Prix – 2nd
- 2003 GNC Show of Strength – 2nd
- 2004 Mr. Olympia – 2nd
- 2005 Mr. Olympia – 2nd
- 2006 Mr. Olympia – 1st
- 2007 Mr. Olympia – 1st
- 2008 Mr. Olympia – 2nd
- 2009 Mr. Olympia – 1st
- 2010 Mr. Olympia – 1st
- 2011 Mr. Olympia – 2nd
- 2011 Sheru Classic – 2nd
- 2013 Mr. Olympia – 6th

== Books ==
- Jay Cutler's No Nonsense Guide To Successful Bodybuilding ISBN 978-0-9744572-0-8

== See also ==
- List of male professional bodybuilders

Mr. Olympia
Preceded by: Dexter Jackson	Succeeded by: Phil Heath
