= Nordschwarzwaldturm =

Coordinates: 48°48′31″N 8°37′31″E

Nordschwarzwaldturm (Tower of Northern Black Forest) is the name of a 148 metres (486 ft) free standing steel framework tower near Schoemberg-Langenbrand in the Black Forest. The Nordschwarzwaldturm was built in 1974 and is used for directional radio services, FM- and TV-transmissions. The tower is not open for the public.

== Transmitted programmes ==
TV-Programmes	Channel	ERP
Das Erste	21	100 kW
ZDF	34	170 kW
SWR Fernsehen Baden-Württemberg	59	160 kW
Radio programme	Frequency	ERP
SWR1 Baden-Württemberg	92,9 MHz	5 kW
bigFM	105,2 MHz	20 kW

== See also ==
- List of towers
