= Rodney St. Cloud =

American bodybuilder and pornographic actor (born 1973)

- Professional bodybuilder

Personal info
- Born: December 3, 1973 (age 52); Brooklyn, New York, U.S

Best statistics
- Height: 5 ft 9 in (175 cm)
- Weight: 238 lb (108 kg) (on-season)

Professional (Pro) career
- Pro-debut: Toronto Pro Supershow; 2000
- Best win: Mr. Olympia; 2003 / 12th

Rodney St. Cloud (born December 3, 1973) is an American retired professional bodybuilder and pornographic actor.

== Career ==
St. Cloud got engaged in the sport of bodybuilding at an early age and he was the overall winner of the Mr. Stevenson High School Championship in 1989. He went on to participate in various National Physique Committee competitions until 1999 when he was the light heavyweight winner at the NPC USA Championships and NPC Nationals, after which he won his IFBB pro card. His first professional event was the 2000 Toronto Pro Supershow where he got the 14th place.

=== Competition history ===
Professional

- 2006 Mr. Olympia - 16th
- 2006 IFBB Atlantic City Pro - 3rd
- 2006 IFBB Europa Super Show - 12th
- 2006 IFBB New York Pro - 8th
- 2006 IFBB Shawn Ray Colorado Pro - 6th
- 2006 IFBB Iron Man Pro -NP
- 2004 IFBB Night Of Champions -16th
- 2004 IFBB Florida Xtreme Pro Challenge - 16th
- 2004 IFBB Grand Prix Hungary - 7th
- 2003 IFBB GNC Show Of Strength - 12th
- 2003 IFBB Grand Prix Holland - 9th
- 2003 IFBB Grand Prix England - 9th
- 2003 Mr. Olympia - 12th
- 2003 IFBB Grand Prix Russia - 5th
- 2003 IFBB Grand Prix Hungary - 2nd
- 2003 IFBB Night Of Champions - 10th
- 2001 IFBB Night Of Champions - 18th
- 2001 IFBB Toronto Pro - 15th
- 2001 IFBB Iron Man Pro - 10th
- 2000 IFBB Night Of Champions - 18th
- 2000 IFBB Toronto Pro - 14th

Amateur

- 1999 NPC USA Championships - Light Heavyweight, 1st
- 1999 NPC Nationals - Light Heavyweight, 1st
- 1998 NPC Nationals - Heavyweight, 5th
- 1998 NPC Junior Nationals - Heavyweight, 1st
- 1998 NPC Atlantic States Championships - Heavyweight, 1st
- 1997 NPC Atlantic States Championships - Lightweight, 1st
- 1996 NPC Junior Nationals - Light Heavyweight, 6th
- 1996 NPC Atlantic States Championships - Light Heavyweight, 3rd
- 1993 NPC Teen Nationals - Middleweight, 3rd
- 1992 NPC New York Metro Championships - Teen, 1st

== Personal life ==
St. Cloud was born in Brooklyn, New York to parents of Haitian origin. The family moved to The Bronx shortly after his birth.

St. Cloud has also been working as an exotic dancer and pornographic actor under the alias "Hot Rod" and he is maintaining the website Strippers in the Hood.
