= Supersize She =

2005 British television documentary

- Directed by: Mira King
- Narrated by: Meussa Berry
- Music by: Ken Mizulani; Ravinder Chahal
- Country of origin: United Kingdom
- Original language: English

Production
- Producer: Mira King
- Editor: Laura Jennings
- Running time: 42 minutes
- Production company: Special Edition Films

Original release
- Network: Channel 5
- Release: April 2005

Supersize She, or Super Size She, is a 2005 television documentary focused on British professional female bodybuilder Joanna Thomas. The title was a take-off on the success of the film Super Size Me. The one-hour program premiered at the MIPTV in April 2005. Since airing on Channel 5, it has been sold and distributed to over 30 countries.

== Plot ==
There are only 70 professional female bodybuilders in the world and Joanna Thomas is one of them. She had a happy childhood, growing up in England with her parents Donovan and Mary Thomas. Joanna wanted to be really good at something in school, so she took up bodybuilding, her first passion. She responded fast and was told she has good genetics. She started hardcore training at age 15. At the age of 21, she became the youngest British female bodybuilder to ever turn professional.

After 12 years of training, at age 27, Joanna moved to Los Angeles. Her goal is to win the Ms. Olympia title and retire at the top. In order to make it to the Olympia stage, she has to win a qualifier called the GNC. Over the next 4 months, she has to lose 30 lbs and build her muscles as she trains at Gold's Gym Venice. She endures regular painful massage sessions to tear her muscles to make them larger. Her father, Donovan, said that after she wins the Olympia he wants her to retire, get into a relationship and have kids.

The bodybuilding industry is poorly funded, so Joanna has a members only website where 400 members pay $25 a month to enter. Her members get to talk to her and see her pose. Her parents would prefer if Joanna didn't have the website, but admit she needs to make money and that sex sells. With 6 weeks left to go before the GNC, Joanna's friend, Debbie, helps Joanna train and motivated. She has to build larger and more defined muscles than Debbie if she wants to win the GNC.

Joanna is 1 week away from the GNC. Performance-enhancing drug use is a question that she has to constantly deal with. While she does not deny taking performance-enhancing drugs, an irritated Joanna sarcastically says that it's all about the steroids. She says she gets very defensive of bodybuilding because it's a lot of hard work and not just steroids. She concludes by saying take what you want, but a lot of people won't look like her. She says it's not just about what people take, but what's in here as she points to her head.

Joanna's parents, Donovan and Mary, also have strong views on performance-enhancing drugs. Her father said he wasn't agreeing with it all, but said it was up to the individual to take that on and face the consequences. Her mother said this is the standard the judges want and the contestants will do what they can to get to that condition. Her father countered that they shouldn't get involved with it, but her mother said they won't get anywhere if they didn't.

Joanna goes to her nutritionist for measurements. He comments that the only place she was holding fat was her back. She says she has 3 more weeks till the Olympia and would try to get that bit off. She is aiming for 3% bodyfat, very low level compared to the recommended minimum of 18% bodyfat for women. The nutritionist explains that 3% bodyfat isn't very healthy and when you got below 9-10% bodyfat you start losing your menstrual cycle. He tells her she has 2.6% bodyfat and that it will be alright if she does it for a short period of time.

Joanna is at risk of damaging her vital organs as her regime has lost her 30 lbs in 16 weeks. Before flying to Atlanta that night for the GNC, she does a photo shoot for her website. She has to constantly update the website to keep members subscribed. She poses on the beach in a small bikini for her photo shoot in front of a few staring onlookers. She says bodybuilding is not quite the sport it is today when she started and that the dream of bodybuilding was not the reality of it. Since her breast tissue was made of fat, she had to get breast implants.

Joanna tells a male bodybuilder she is walking with that she is sick as being seen as a sex object and never as an athlete. She says she has no sponsorship at the moment and only makes money from her website. She says stupid people are emailing her and she can't even check her email sometimes. She concludes her talk with him by saying she wants to be appreciated sometimes a little differently. Joanna calls her mom and tells her she is nervous about the show and wants to get it done. She also says she has a lot of body injuries.

It is the morning of the GNC outside of the Cobb Galleria Centre. At her apartment in Atlanta, Joanna has makeup applied to her by Debbie and another female bodybuilder. She says because they are very muscular, they must exaggerate the rest of their femininity to compensate for what society defines as being masculine. The GNC Show of Strength is the last chance this year for female bodybuilders to qualify for the Olympia. Joanna must place 1st or 2nd place at the GNC in order to qualify.

Backstage at the GNC, Joanna sees other contestants for the first time. The contestants are all in colored bikinis with numbers on them and are working out prior to taking stage. She comments that Jeannie Paparone has a nice shape and could be hard to beat. Jeannie says she was training for 8 months. Joanna comments that some of the contestants had been training all year around and she had only been training since May. Just before taking stage, the women attempt to make their veins bulge out of their skin by eating sugary foods. The contestants are called up to line up numerically before going on stage. They are told to have no ear rings on, only wedding rings.

Joanna, who is contestant number 7, is called up on stage to pose. This is part of the first round, which judges the contestants on their muscularity and symmetry. The contestants look strong, but they are actually at their weakest physically after weeks of crash dieting.

At the end of the first round, the judges pick out their 3 favorites. The order is a strong indicator of the final placing. Joanna said if she isn't called out 1st or 2nd that there is a problem. The emcee calls out Nancy first, contestant number 2 Rosemary Jennings second and Joanna third. Debbie speculates Joanna could place 2nd or 3rd. She won't find out where she placed until the final round of the evening event. After the first round, backstage Debbie tells her the only thing she needs to do is to spread her legs more.

Debbie and another female bodybuilder are helping Joanna get on her finals bikini. A last minute decision means she is moved up on the schedule by 11 minutes to be on stage, instead of 30 minutes. She is enraged as she is not pumped up at all. She works out and consumes sugary drinks before being called on stage. She came on stage in a pink bikini and posed to the song Barbie Girl. Joanna, along with Nancy, Rosemary, Jeannie, contestant number 1, Gayle Moher and number 4, Mary Doss all began performing free form poses and try to over-shine their contestants for the judges to see. After Gayle is announced 4th place and Rosemary announced 3rd place, both Joanna and Nancy hold hands as it is announced that Joanna came in 2nd place.

Afterwards, Joanna said some people thought she should have won it, but she wanted to see the scoresheet. Her 2nd place finish won her $2,000 and if she wins the Olympia she will get $10,000, a fraction of the $120,000 her male counterparts get. She then started modeling again for her website. She says it is impossible for her to be both a professional athlete and work a job 60 hours a week.

Joanna's parents, Donovan and Mary, commented they never thought she would do anything like modeling for a website. Her parents send her a DVD of family videos, including her watching her first contest. She comments that she wishes she had the passion she had when she first competed in bodybuilding and commented her face was cuter. The DVD video concludes with her being named the 57 kilo East Midlands champion for 1997. She commented that when she was young she was the only one in school who could do press-ups. She said she started so young that bodybuilding isn't a sport or a hobby, it is who she is.

The day before the Olympia, Joanna is back gym training. She looks strong, but a diet of protein powder and dried meat means she's at her weakest. After five months of training, she and Debbie are at Olympia at Mandalay Bay in Las Vegas. The night before the Olympia, bodybuilding fans get to meet the contestants and Joanna gets a look at the other contestants. She and Betty Pariso are both sitting at booths next to each other. Dayana Cadeau boasts that there is nobody in her class who can beat her.

Joanna must spend the next 12 hours fasting and dehydrating before the contest. She flew her parents to the Olympia and it the first time in five months they have seen her. As they head to the Olympia for her to compete, she tells her mom that if she doesn't get called the first two times of each round she's at the bottom placing.

Joanna's dream since she started bodybuilding when she was 15 was to win the Olympia and retire at the top of her sport. She awaits her turn to be called on stage as contestant number 1, Marja Lehtonen, number 4, Denise Masino and number 2, Dayana Cadeau, all get on stage individually and free form pose. She comments that these are the best female bodybuilders in the world and have done several of these shows before. Joanna, who is number 9, gets up on stage and free form poses.

Joanna is up against eight other contestants. In order to win, the constestant’s name has to be called out. The emcee calls out the following contestants: Denise, Dayana, contestant number 3, Desiree Ellis, contestant number 8, Mah Ann Mendoza and Marja. Joanna was not called out in the first round and she only has the evening show to improve her chances of winning.

At the finals, Dayana, Marja and Denise are shown individually free form posing. Joanna says winning the Ms. Olympia is akin to winning hundred meters sprinting for England at the Olympic Games. She is called on stage does her free form posing. The emcee announces the top 3 contestants: Marja, Denise and Dayana, who wins 1st place.

Next morning, Joanna calls one of the Olympia judges, Steve Weinberger, and he tells her she came in 7th place. The judge tells her that her lower body does not match her upper body so she is not symmetrical and that's why she is placed 7th. She says she didn't want to end her career with her being told she didn't have good legs. She tells her parents that she makes more money in Los Angeles than in the United Kingdom being a staff nurse. Her father hopes that once she retires, she will get in a relationship and has children so he can be a grandfather. Joanna says she is committed to bodybuilding and doesn't want to retire.

== Documentary mistakes ==
The narrator incorrectly states that Joanna Thomas was 20 years old to become the youngest female bodybuilder in the world to turn professional (pro). At the 1998 English Federation of Bodybuilders (EFBB) British Championships, she won the lightweight category and overall title and became the youngest British female bodybuilder to ever to win both the EFBB British Championships and to turn pro at the age of 21 years old. The youngest female bodybuilder to ever turn pro was Canadian Deanna Panting, who won 1st in the heavyweight category at the 1984 International Federation of Bodybuilders North American Championships at the age of 19 years old.

== Reviews ==
Reviews have been written for Supersize She from the Daily Mirror, Liverpool Echo, The Beachwood Reporter, The Daily Telegraph, The Guardian, The Independent and Voices, newsletter of the Gender Studies Program at Northwestern University.

== See also ==
- 2004 Ms. Olympia
