= Gustavo Badell =

Puerto Rican bodybuilder (1971–2023)

- Professional bodybuilder
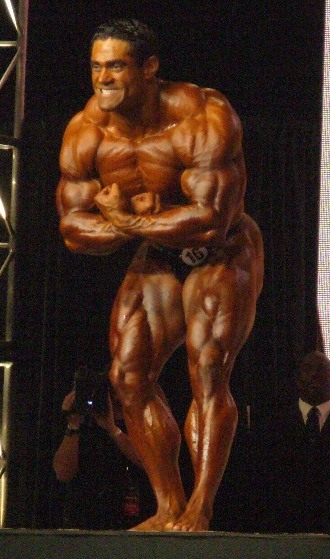
- Gustavo Badell posing

Personal info
- Nickname: The Freakin' 'Rican
- Born: November 3, 1972; Maracaibo, Venezuela
- Died: July 12, 2023 (aged 51)

Best statistics
- Height: 5 ft 7.7 in / 172 cm
- Weight: Contest: 245lb Off season: 260-265 lb

Professional (Pro) career
- Best win: Ironman Pro Invitational; 2006

Gustavo Badell (November 3, 1972 – July 12, 2023), also nicknamed The Freakin' 'Rican, was a Venezuelan International Federation of BodyBuilders professional bodybuilder. He died from a sudden stroke in Venezuela after multiple heart issues.

== Background ==
Badell was born in Maracaibo, Venezuela and moved to Puerto Rico when he was around 22 years old. He began lifting weights at the age of fifteen to increase his size for boxing. Gustavo gained muscle incredibly fast, and when he was 19 entered and won his first bodybuilding competition, the 1991 Junior Caribbean Bodybuilding Championships.

After six years of weight training he was able to turn professional by winning the 1997 Caribbean Championships. His first International Federation of BodyBuilders appearance was in 1998 when he competed in the Grand Prix of Germany. He first competed in the International Federation of BodyBuilders Night of Champions (now called the New York Pro) in 1999, where he finished in 14th place. His first Ironman Pro Invitational was in 2000, where he was 18th.

His first Mr. Olympia appearance was in 2002, where he was 24th. His first Arnold Classic was in 2004, where he was 7th. His professional placings were lackluster until 2003 when he started placing higher, in part because of help from fellow professional bodybuilder Milos Sarcev. Badell's jump from 24th place in the 2002 Mr. Olympia to 3rd place in the 2004 Mr. Olympia is the greatest leap from one Olympia appearance to the next of all time. He was 3rd again in the Mr. Olympia in 2005, and he won the "Challenge Round" (judged by previous Mr. Olympia winners) over even Ronnie Coleman and Jay Cutler.

Badell appeared in many fitness and magazine articles as well as on the cover of Flex magazine. He appeared in numerous advertisements for MuscleTech, normally for Nitrotech Hardcore protein powder and Masstech weight-gain powder.

Badell died on July 12, 2023, by stroke, at the age of 51.

== Profile ==
- Residence: Orlando Fl
- Family: Wife Mariangel Badell and six children
- Height: 5 ft 7.7 in (172 cm)
- Competition weight: 245 pounds (111 kg)
- Offseason weight: 260–265 pounds (118–120 kg)

== Contest history ==
- 1991 Junior Caribbean Championships, overall winner
- 1997 Caribbean Championships, overall winner (received pro card)
- 1997 World Amateur Championships Heavyweight, 10th
- 1998 Grand Prix Germany, 9th
- 1999 Grand Prix England, 17th
- 1999 Night of Champions, Did Not Place
- 1999 World Pro Championships, 14th
- 2000 Ironman Pro Invitational, 18th
- 2000 Night of Champions, Did Not Place
- 2000 Toronto Pro Invitational, Did Not Place
- 2000 World Pro Championships, 11th
- 2001 Grand Prix England, Did Not Place
- 2001 Ironman Pro Invitational, 16th
- 2001 San Francisco Pro Invitational, 11th
- 2002 Ironman Pro Invitational, 13th
- 2002 Night of Champions, 10th
- 2002 Mr. Olympia, 24th
- 2002 Southwest Pro Cup, 6th
- 2002 Toronto Pro Invitational, 3rd
- 2004 Arnold Classic, 7th
- 2004 Ironman Pro Invitational, 3rd
- 2004 San Francisco Pro Invitational, 4th
- 2004 Show of Strength Pro Championship, 3rd
- 2004 Mr. Olympia, 3rd
- 2005 Arnold Classic, 3rd
- 2005 Ironman Pro Invitational, 1st
- 2005 Mr. Olympia, 3rd
- 2006 Arnold Classic, 4th
- 2006 San Francisco Pro Invitational, 1st
- 2006 Mr. Olympia, 6th
- 2007 Arnold Classic, 4th
- 2007 Mr. Olympia 8th
- 2008 Ironman Pro Invitational, 2nd
- 2008 Arnold Classic, 6th
- 2008 Mr. Olympia, 10th
- 2009 Atlantic City Pro, 1st
- 2009 Mr. Olympia, 13th
- 2012 Arnold Classic, 13th

== See also ==
- List of male professional bodybuilders
- List of female professional bodybuilders
