= Joanna Thomas =

British bodybuilder (1976–2020)

- ♀ Professional bodybuilder

Personal info
- Nickname: Buff Barbie (bodybuilding); Jo
- Born: 12 December 1976; Truro, Cornwall, England
- Died: 26 April 2020 (aged 43); Camborne, Cornwall, England

Best statistics
- Height: 5 ft 2 in (1.57 m)
- Weight: In Season: 114–135 lb (8–10 st; 52–61 kg); Off-Season: 145–160 lb (10–11 st; 66–73 kg)

Professional (Pro) career
- Pro-debut: IFBB Jan Tana Classic; 2001
- Best win: IFBB Jan Tana Classic lightweight champion; 2001
- Predecessor: Renee Casella
- Successor: Fannie Barrios
- Active: 2001–2007
Medal record
Professional female bodybuilding
IFBB Pro League contests
1st	2001 Jan Tana Classic	Lightweight female bodybuilding
2nd	2003 Jan Tana Classic	Lightweight female bodybuilding
2nd	2004 General Nutrition Centers Show of Strength	Lightweight female bodybuilding

Joanna Clare Dawson Thomas (briefly Joanna Schwartz) (12 December 1976 – 26 April 2020) was a British professional female bodybuilder. She was the younger sister of British professional female bodybuilder Nicola Shaw. She was the youngest British female bodybuilder to win IFBB pro card, at the age of 21.

== Early life ==
Joanna Thomas was born on 12 December 1976, in Truro, Cornwall, England, United Kingdom, to Donovan and Mary Thomas. She is the middle of three siblings, having an older sister, Nicola and later a younger brother, Stuart. Her father is a painter and decorator and her mother is a farm worker. She grew up in Camborne, Cornwall, which she described growing up as "pretty working class and basic in a small town". At the age of 14, she was groomed by one of her parents' lodgers and he had a sexual relationship with her.

== Bodybuilding career ==
=== Amateur ===
As a child Joanna had chronic asthma and was unable to do any sort of strenuous physical activities at a young age, but had always wanted a bigger build for her body. When she was 14 years old, she saw for the first time pictures of female bodybuilders in a magazine that belonged to a college student who was staying with her family. She in love with the way they looked and decided to become a professional bodybuilder, along with and wanting something to keep fit herself hit due to her asthma. Her sister, Nicola, who had been a sprinter, started bodybuilding.

Three months later, at 107 lb (8 st; 49 kg), Joanna worked up the courage to go to a local gym and told the owner she wanted to build muscle. The gym owner's wife dismissed her goal of building muscle by saying it should be left to the men, however, her husband began to train her. She started bodybuilding and lifting weights at 15 years old and soon discovered she had great genetics for it. He gave her a training plan of a 3 split routine a week. She quickly grew out of her asthma. She said within six months of training she was the only girl in my gym class that could do proper push-ups. She followed the training plan for two years and gained 91 lb (7 st; 41 kg), including putting on 9 lb (1 st; 4 kg) of muscle with that program.

In 1993, Joanna graduated from the Camborne Science and International Academy. By the time she was 17 years old, she was bodybuilding seriously and began "obsessive weight training". She ate more, spent all her spare money on supplements and trained "like a robot." She started diploma in business and dropped out. She then did 18 months of nursing at Cornwall College Camborne. At the 1996 English Federation of Bodybuilders (EFBB) British Championships, her sister Nicola, who had only qualified 2 weeks prior, got second place in the lightweight category. Joanna started to get heavily into prescription drugs and other illegal drugs before she turned 20.

In 1997, at the age of 20 years old, Joanna won the middleweight category her first bodybuilding contest, the 1997 EFBB Northeast Qualifier, which qualified for the British Championships. At the 1997 EFBB British Championships, she competed alongside Nicola in the lightweight division. Joanna placed third in the lightweights, while Nicola, who had only been bodybuilding for 6 years, won the lightweight and overall title, becoming the first lightweight to win the British Championships overall title, which earned her an IFBB Pro card at the age of 23 years old. She never competed as a professional and retired from bodybuilding a year later.

In 1998, Joanna she moved to Manchester to being train at Betta Bodies, one of England's top hardcore gyms, and began taking steroids, such as corticosteroid and anabolic steroids, to promote muscular development. She got help from Kerry Kayes, a bodybuilder, owner of Betta Bodies and one of the United Kingdom's top bodybuilding gurus, and Diane Royle, a former javelin thrower and bodybuilder. Chemical Nutrition, the supplement company Kerry co-owns with former Mr. Olympia Dorian Yates, sponsored her. She tried to transfer her nursing course, but bodybuilding clashed with being on the wards and the shifts, so she left her education in pursuit of bodybuilding. At 1998 EFBB Northeast Qualifier, she would again win the middleweight category and quality for the British Championships. Within 6 months of her leaving her education pursuit, on 26 September 1998, at the 1998 EFBB British Championships, Joanna won the lightweight category and overall title and became the youngest British female bodybuilder to ever to win an IFBB pro card at the age of 21 years old. Her record that remains unbroke to this day.

=== Professional ===
Joanna spent the next 2 years, including completing 2 years of nursing school and eventually stopped going to school in order concentrate on her bodybuilding career, in Manchester making a living as a care worker and honing her physique, packing on more size, improving her shape and increasing her muscle maturity. The International Federation of Bodybuilders Professional Division (IFBB Pro Division) had introduced weight classes for professional female bodybuilding contests, dramatically improving the prospects for her. In the spring of 2001 she began preparing for her professional debut at the 2001 Jan Tana Classic. At the 2001 Jana Tana Classic, at the age of 24 years old, she won her pro debut by getting 1st in the lightweight title, which qualified her for the Ms. Olympia. There was no overall champion for Jan Tana that year which made her a co-champion with the other female bodybuilders who won their classes. She stated that qualifying for the Ms. Olympia was a 10-year goal of her she achieved. After winning the Jana Tana Classic, she began doing photo and video shoots and started receiving fan mail.

Before attending the Olympia, Steve Wennerstrom, IFBB women's historian and a friend of Joanna, invited her to stay in his place in San Diego, California, to prepare for the Ms. Olympia contest. The change in routine threw off her preparation. When she arrived at the 2001 Ms. Olympia, he found the show badly organized and stressful. At the age of 24 years old, she was the youngest contestant attending the 2001 Ms. Olympia, with only Iris Kyle, at age 27, being the only other contestant being born in the 1970s. She contributed her lack of muscle maturity due to her young age compared to the rest of the contestants, along with holding water on the day of the show, as the main contributions for her placing 10th in the lightweight division, which was the last place in her class.

After the 2001 Ms. Olympia, Joanna relocated her home from Manchester to Fort Lauderdale in order to live with her American boyfriend, Miles, to train, work for a friends personal training company called Unique Physique and work on her website. In 2002, she took the year off from competing and launched her website. At the 2003 Jan Tana Classic, she placed 2nd in the lightweight category. She said she didn't prepare quite long enough to achieve the condition she was after at the 2003 Jan Tana Classic. In May 2004, she moved to Marina del Rey, Los Angeles to train. In June 2004, she began training with professional bodybuilder Charles Glass and Chad Nicholls for the 2004 GNC Show of Strength.

At the 2004 GNC Show of Strength, Joanna got 2nd place in the lightweight category, which qualified her for the Ms. Olympia. At the 2004 Ms. Olympia, she was the youngest contestant competing and got 7th place in the lightweight category. According to a 2004 Ms. Olympia judge, Steve Weinberger, he told her that her lower body does not match her upper body so she is not symmetrical and that's why she is placed at 7th. She was injured in a car crash and started taking strong pain relief medication that was not available in the United Kingdom. In 2005, the television documentary Supersize She aired. The documentary covered her childhood, modeling for her website and her training and competing at the 2004 GNC Show of Strength and 2004 Ms. Olympia. Also in 2005, she moved back to Fort Lauderdale. After a 2 year break from competing, she attended the 2007 Atlantic City Pro, where she got 4th place in the lightweight category. Afterwards, she wasn't happy with the results from the Atlantic City Pro and retired from professional bodybuilding.

After 2 years in retirement, in July 2010, at the 2010 NPC Southern States Championships, Joanna, interviewed by Annie Rivieccio, announced she had moved back to Fort Lauderdale, Florida from the United Kingdom and coming out of retirement in bodybuilding. In August 2010, she began training again. In 2011, she moved her home from Fort Lauderdale to Sarasota and was focusing on improving her physique in order to compete in the near future. She later returned to Cornwall and stopped bodybuilding, she would not want to go out or do anything.

=== Legacy ===
At the 1998 EFBB British Championships, Joanna won the lightweight category and overall title and became the youngest British female bodybuilder to ever to win both the EFBB British Championships and her IFBB pro card at the age of 21 years old. She is sometimes incorrectly cited by sources as being the youngest female bodybuilder to ever win an IFBB pro card. The youngest female bodybuilder to ever win an IFBB pro card was Canadian Deanna Panting, who won 1st in the heavyweight category at the 1984 IFBB North American Championships at the age of 19 years old.

At the 2006 UKBFF British Championships, Michelle Jones won the middleweight and overall title, which broke Joanna's record as the youngest female bodybuilder to win the UKBFF British Championships as Michelle was eight months younger than her when Joanna won the British Championships in 1998. However, in 2005 the UKBFF had changed the rules of the British Championships so that while the men's winner would continue to get an automatic IFBB pro card, the women's winner would not. Thus Joanna retained her record as youngest British female bodybuilder to ever to win her IFBB pro card. Her record remains unbroke to this day. She is one of the most famous Cornish female bodybuilders ever due to her exposure in he documentary Supersize She.

=== Competition history ===
- 1997 EFBB Northeast Qualifier - 1st (MW)
- 1997 EFBB British Championships - 3rd (LW)
- 1998 EFBB Northwest Qualifier - 1st (MW)
- 1998 EFBB British Championships - 1st (LW and overall)
- 2001 IFBB Jan Tana Classic - 1st (LW)
- 2001 IFBB Ms. Olympia - 10th (LW)
- 2003 IFBB Jan Tana Classic - 2nd (LW)
- 2004 IFBB GNC Show of Strength - 2nd (LW)
- 2004 IFBB IFBB Ms. Olympia - 7th (LW)
- 2007 IFBB Atlantic City Pro - 4th (LW)

=== Best statistics ===
- Biceps - 16 1/2 in (42 cm)
- Bodyfat - 2.6–6%
- Calves - 17 in (43 cm)
- Chest - 39 in (99 cm)
- Height - 5 ft 2 in (1.57 m)
- On season weight - 114–135 lb (8–10 st; 52–61 kg)
- Quads - 25 in (64 cm)
- Thighs - 24 in (61 cm)

== Death ==
In April 2020 Thomas was found dead in her flat in Camborne, Cornwall by a police officer conducting a wellness check. A note was later found in her apartment by her mother which said if she was found dead "it would have been an accident". In November 2020, her GP surgery found that she had used steroids and anabolic steroids in her bodybuilding career, as well as illegal drugs and prescribed medication. Her cause of death was listed as multiple drug toxicity.

Her funeral was held on 14 May 2020 at the Treswithian Down Crematorium in Camborne and was cremated. The service was conducted by Church of England Revd. Roosheen Browning.

== Personal life ==
After retiring from bodybuilding in 2007, Joanna married American Andrew Schwartz and they both moved to the United Kingdom in 2014, but he could not get a work permit and returned to the United States. Afterwards, they divorced and he later died. She was diagnosed with depression and bipolar disorder. She was a Christian and had a Bible in which she wrote in and highlighted passages.

== Television ==
=== Supersize She ===
In 2005, Thomas was featured in a one-hour documentary on the British channel five called Supersize She, which also broadcast in the US on The Learning Channel. The show followed her training leading up to the 2004 Ms. Olympia contest. The documentary talks about her life, her parents' feelings about her decision to become a bodybuilder and nude model, her stringent dieting requirements and her passion for bodybuilding as well as all the sacrifices and physical changes she had to go through to become a professional bodybuilder. This gave her a solid amount of exposure in her country and in the United States. In a short article in Robert Kennedy's MuscleMag International Thomas talked of finding a small level of fame after appearing in the documentary. She mentioned being recognized on the streets and being asked for autographs by people who saw the documentary.

=== Film appearance ===
In 2006, Thomas starred in the short comedy film, All's Swell That Ends Swell!, where she played the Beautician.

== See also ==
- Female bodybuilding
- List of female professional bodybuilders
