= Troy Alves =

American bodybuilder

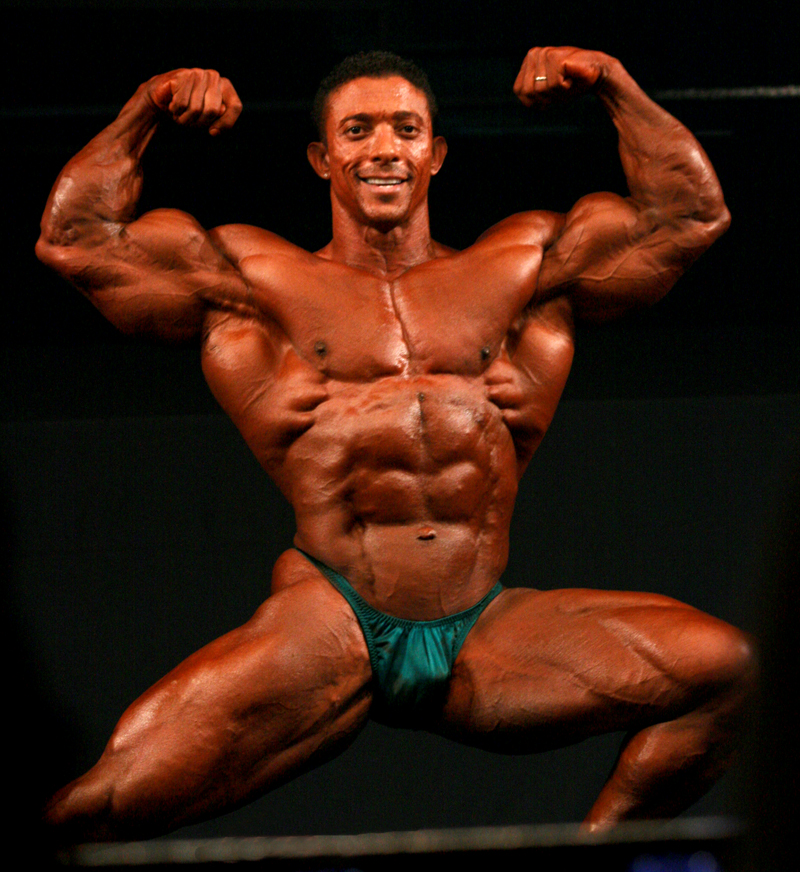
- Born: September 26, 1966 (age 59)
- Occupation: Professional bodybuilder

Troy Alves (born September 26, 1966) is an American retired IFBB professional bodybuilder.

== Stats ==
- Height: 5 feet 8 inches (1.73 m)
- Off season weight: 245 pounds (111 kg)
- Competition weight: 220 pounds (100 kg)

== Background ==
Initially a high school and later a college baseball star, Troy always had a love for weight training that dated back to his sophomore year of high school. While on a full scholarship at a Glendale community college for baseball, Alves injured himself while weight training. His career in baseball was seriously jeopardized, prompting Alves to quit college and join the United States Airforce. Having a child at the time was one of the major reasons for doing so. After being told he should pursue bodybuilding, Alves broke into his first show in 1996 when he competed in the NPC (National Physique Committee) USA Championships, where he placed 8th. His first IFBB competition was the Arnold Classic of 2003, where he placed 10th.

His first Mr. Olympia came in 2003, where he placed 8th. Alves is known for his symmetrical and balanced body. Alves has been featured in many fitness articles over the years and has appeared on the cover of FLEX magazine. Today he lives in Peoria, Arizona, USA where he owns his own supplement store Pro Nutrition. He is a childhood friend of actor Michael Jai White from when they attended school together.

Troy competed on February 20, 2010 at the 1st Phoenix Pro IFBB Pro Bodybuilding Show in Mesa, Arizona. Troy Alves won his 2nd IFBB Professional 1st place win in Connecticut Saturday July 30, 2011 for the Europa battle of champions and his 3rd IFBB Professional 1st place win in Arizona at the 2nd Annual Phoenix Pro IFBB Pro Bodybuilding Show Saturday August 2011.

Troy Alves switched bodybuilding classes, from competing in the Men's Open class to the 212 class and competed in his first show at the 2013 Europa Show of Champions Florida 212 class. He received 1st place which qualified him for an invite to compete in the 2013 Olympia in Las Vegas September 2013.

Previous contest History:

- 1996 NPC USA Championships, Light-HeavyWeight, 8th
- 1997 NPC Junior USA, Light-HeavyWeight, 1st place * and Overall
- 1997 NPC Nationals, Light-HeavyWeight, 6th
- 1998 NPC Nationals, Light-HeavyWeight, 8th
- 1998 NPC USA Championships, Light-HeavyWeight, 1st place *
- 1999 NPC Nationals, Light-HeavyWeight, 7th
- 1999 North American Championships, Light-HeavyWeight, 3rd
- 2000 NPC Nationals, HeavyWeight, 2nd
- 2000 NPC USA Championships, HeavyWeight, 2nd
- 2001 NPC USA Championships, HeavyWeight, 2nd
- 2002 NPC USA Championships, HeavyWeight, 1st place *
- 2003 Arnold Classic - IFBB, 10th
- 2003 Grand Prix Australia - IFBB, 2nd
- 2003 Grand Prix England - IFBB, 6th
- 2003 Grand Prix Holland - IFBB, 6th
- 2003 Grand Prix Russia - IFBB, 4th
- 2003 Ironman Pro Invitational - IFBB, 4th
- 2003 Maximum Pro Invitational - IFBB, 5th
- 2003 Mr. Olympia - IFBB, 8th
- 2003 San Francisco Pro Invitational - IFBB, 5th
- 2004 Mr. Olympia - IFBB, 15th
- 2004 Show of Strength Pro Championship - IFBB, 5th
- 2005 Arnold Classic, 8th
- 2005 Ironman Pro Invitational, 3rd
- 2005 San Francisco Pro Invitational, 4th
- 2006 Arnold Classic, 11th
- 2006 Colorado Pro Championships, 8th
- 2006 Ironman Pro Invitational, 3rd
- 2006 Mr. Olympia, 15th
- 2009 Europa Show Of Champions Hartford Pro Show, 1st place *
- 2009 Mr. Olympia, 16th
- 2010 Phoenix Pro Show, 5th
- 2010 Tampa Pro Show, 2nd place
- 2010 Europa Show of Champions Hartford Pro Show, 2nd place
- 2010 Mr. Olympia, 15th
- 2011 Europa Show of Champions Hartford Pro Show, 1st place *
- 2011 Phoenix Pro Show, 1st place *
- 2011 Mr. Olympia, 16th
- 2011 Masters Pro Florida,
- 2013 Europa Show of Champions Florida 212 class 1st place *
