= Andreas Bohnenstengel =

German photographer

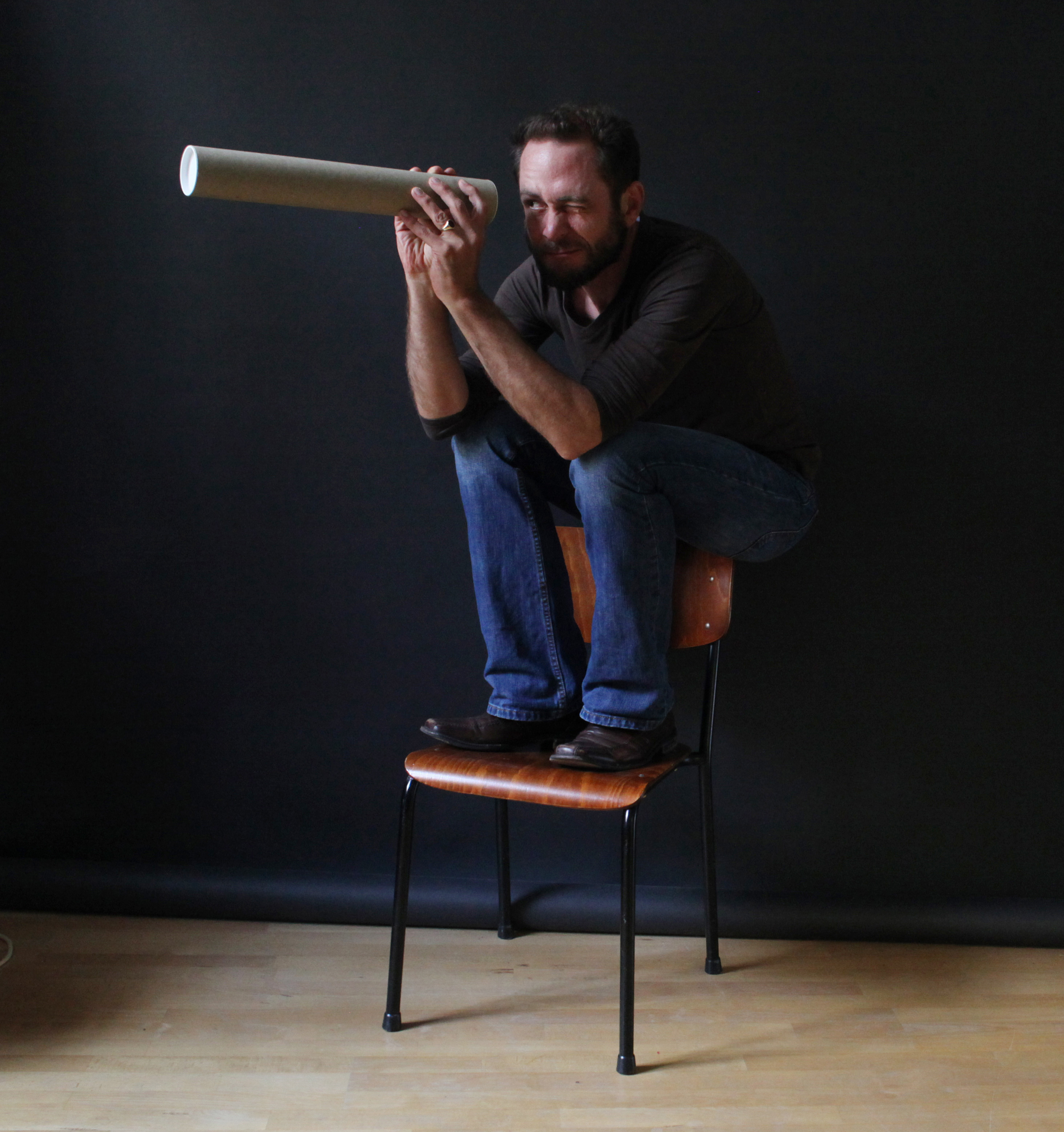
- Andreas Bohnenstengel, 2013
- Born: 9 June 1970 (age 55); Munich, Germany
- Known for: Photography

Andreas Bohnenstengel (born 9 June 1970) is a German photographer who lives and works in Munich.

== Biography ==
Bohnenstengel began in 1991 as a press photographer for the regional daily newspaper Münchner Merkur. Subsequently, he worked for magazines like Der Spiegel, Stern, and others, as well as the Rolf Müller office for visual communication. Since 2004 he has taught photography for example at Schule für Gestaltung in Ravensburg. In his conceptual works, he discusses the phenomenae of society. Works by Bohnenstengel are held in the permanent collection of the Deutsches Historisches Museum in Berlin.

== Awards ==
- 1995: Medienpreis für Sozialfotografie
- 1996: Kodak European Gold Award
- 1997: Die 100 besten Plakate des Jahres 1997. Poster: Glückskinder
- 1999: Auszeichnung Deutsche Städtemedien, Kulturplakat des Monats
- 2001: Nikon Photo Contest International

== Exhibitions ==
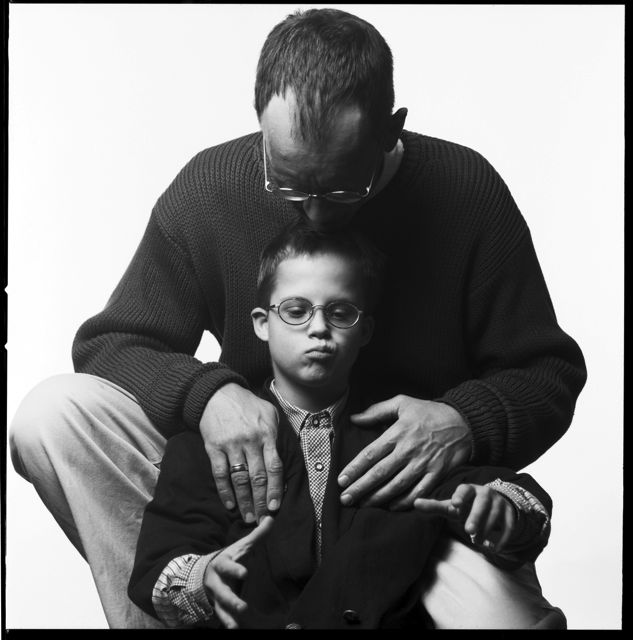
Bohnenstengel's "People with Down's syndrome – father and son, 2000", from the book and exhibition Ich bin anders als du denkst

- Summer 2022: Very nice that you exist contribution to the glockenbach biennial with the motto different = normal
- Summer 2020: The time before Corona – reminder marker, public space munich, continued with the series: The Expectation
- February 2019 – May 2019: Der Wasserburger Taubenmarkt, Photo installation in the Museum Wasserburg
- November 2018 – January 2019: Kinderleicht – Jugendfußball, at the city hall Krailling
- July 2017: Der Pferdemarkt München – Pictures from a previous world. Solo Exhibition at the Sendlinger Kulturschmiede, Munich
- July 2017: Kunst im Viehhof – poster competition. Awards for the poster „Feste feiern wie sie fallen"
- June 2015: Von Rössern, Reitern und Händlern: Der Roßmarkt damals. Photo installation Viehhof, Munich
- March 2015: Kriegsenkel. Solo exhibition at Spirituelles Zentrum St. Martin, Munich
- January 2008: Treffpunkt Leben. Jung und Alt im Austausch. (Supporting a class of design students of the sfg-Ravensburg as a lecturer) Exhibition and book. Seniorenzentrum St. Vinzenz, Wangen im Allgäu
- November 2014: Kein Ort, nirgends?. Solo exhibition at the Tagungshaus Helmstedt at the conference of Kriegsenkel e.V.
- August 2005: 24 Stunden im Leben der katholischen Kirche, Exhibition at World Youth Day in Cologne
- July 2003: Menschen mit Down-Syndrom begegnen. Solo exhibition at the Bayerischen Sozialministerium, part of the European year of disabled persons
- May 2003: Habe Hunger und kein Bett. Participation in an art and social project on homelessness, Pasinger Fabrik, Munich
- October 2002: Augenblicke. Solo exhibition in the Galerie der Gegenfüßler der IG Medien in ver.di Bayern, Munich
- October 2002: Menschen mit Down-Syndrom begegnen. Solo exhibition at the Zentrum für natürliche Geburt, Munich. Start of Touring exhibition
- June 2002: Photo installation Augenblicke, Regensburg and other locations
- December 2001: Brauchtumspflege in Bayern: Gaupreisplatteln. Exhibition participation and award Pressefoto Bayern 2001, Maximilianeum Munich
- October 2001: Exhibition participation at the 4. Schömberger Fotoherbst – Festival für klassische Reise – und Reportagefotografie, Schömberg (Schwarzwald)
- October 2001: ALTerLEBEN. Solo exhibition about older People with disabilities, for 30th anniversary of Vereinigung für Jugendhilfe Berlin e.V.
- February 2001: Werkschau. Slide projection at Kunstpark Ost, Munich
- June 2000: Es ist normal Verschieden zu sein. Touring exhibition 40 years of Lebenshilfe, Munich and other locations
- December 1999: Der fremde Blick. Solo exhibition on transcultural encounters, culture centre Unna
- October 1999: Ich bin anders als du denkst. Solo exhibition about young people with Down-Syndrom, Pasinger Fabrik, Munich. Touring exhibition with 30 locations
- October 1998: Exhibition participation at the 1. Schömberger Fotoherbst – Festival für klassische Reise – und Reportagefotografie, Schömberg (Schwarzwald)
- November 1997: Glückskinder. Solo exhibition Seidlvilla, Munich
- September 1997: Alt und Jung. "Old and Young" – Exhibition participation and first prize, Aspekte Galerie Gasteig, Munich
- December 1993: Willkommen im Würmtal. Solo exhibition about asylum seekers, Gräfelfing
- September 1993: Flüchtingscontainer. Exhibition at „Fremde Heimat München" culture festival with a series on life in a shelter, Munich
- August 1993: Eine Bühne für das Alter. Solo exhibition about elderly people, retirement home Maria Eich Krailling
- July 1993: Gewalt: In der Welt habt ihr Angst. Solo exhibition about asylum seekers at the 25. German Evangelical Church Assembly, Munich

== Gallery ==
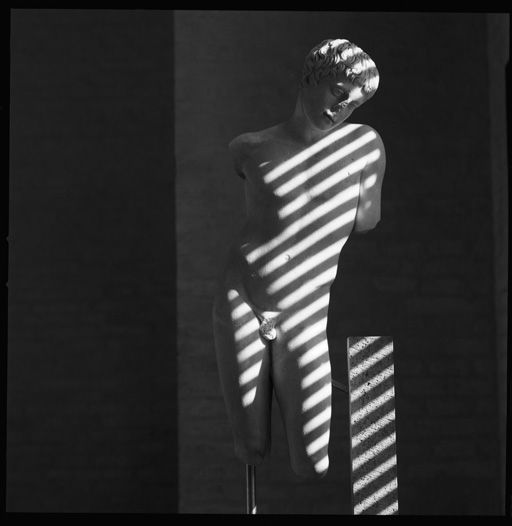
Schattenspiel from Glyptothek

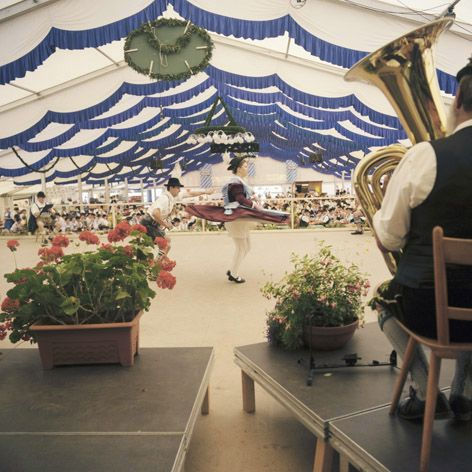
Gaudirndldrahn from Heimat

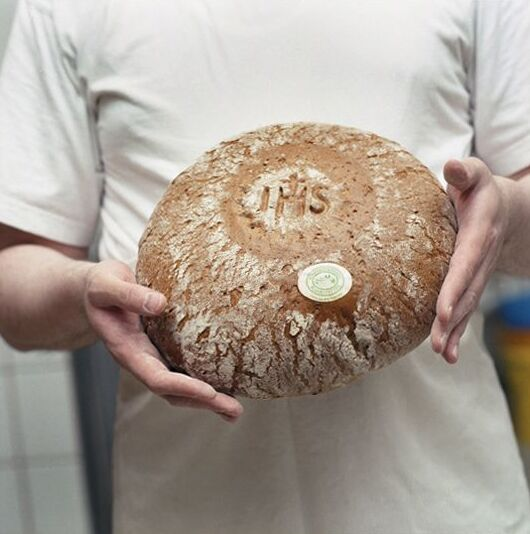
Brotlaib from 24 Stunden im Leben der katholischen Kirche

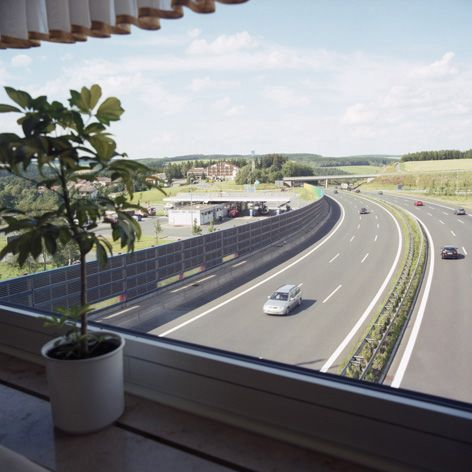
Autobahn from Made in Germany
