= Art Atwood =

American professional bodybuilder (1973–2011)

- Professional bodybuilder

Personal info
- Born: December 27, 1973; Wisconsin, U.S.
- Died: September 11, 2011 (aged 37); Dallas, Texas, U.S.

Best statistics
- Height: 5 ft 11 in (1.80 m)
- Weight: Competition: 250–308 lb (113–140 kg); Off-season: 330–350 lb (150–160 kg)

Professional (Pro) career
- Best win: NPC Junior USA, Super-Heavyweight, 2000 NPC Nationals, Super-Heavyweight, 2001 Toronto Pro Invitational, 2002

Arthur Dale Atwood (December 27, 1973 – September 11, 2011), known professionally as Art Atwood, was an American IFBB professional heavyweight bodybuilder.

== Career ==
A native of Wisconsin, Atwood had his first NPC (National Physique Committee) competition in 2000, where he took first place in the super-heavyweight class of the Junior USA. His professional bodybuilding debut was the 2001 Toronto Pro, in which he took first place. His first IFBB Mr. Olympia came in 2002, where he placed 12th. After other various competitions he competed in the IFBB Night of Champions tournament of 2003, where he placed 7th. His first Arnold Classic was in 2005, where he placed 14th. He retired from stage competitions in 2006.

Atwood has been featured in many fitness and bodybuilding magazines, as well as appearing on the cover of RxMuscle magazine.

== Contest history ==
- 2000 NPC Junior USA, Super-HeavyWeight, 1st and Overall
- 2000 NPC Nationals, Super-HeavyWeight, 14th
- 2000 NPC USA Championships, Super-HeavyWeight, 7th
- 2001 NPC Nationals, Super-HeavyWeight, 1st
- 2001 NPC USA Championships, Super-HeavyWeight, 3rd
- 2002 Grand Prix England, 7th
- 2002 Mr. Olympia, 12th
- 2002 Show of Strength Pro Championship, 12th
- 2002 Toronto Pro Invitational, 1st
- 2003 Grand Prix England, 7th
- 2003 Grand Prix Holland, 8th
- 2003 Grand Prix Hungary, 3rd
- 2003 Grand Prix Russia, 6th
- 2003 Night of Champions, 7th
- 2003 Mr. Olympia, 13th
- 2004 Florida Pro Xtreme Challenge, 5th
- 2004 Hungarian Pro Invitational, 8th
- 2004 Night of Champions, 9th
- 2004 Toronto Pro Invitational, 5th
- 2005 Arnold Classic, 14th
- 2005 San Francisco Pro Invitational, 10th
- 2006 Europa Super Show, 5th
- 2006 Montreal Pro, 7th
- 2006 Atlantic City Pro, 10th

== Arrest ==
In May 2007, Atwood was pulled over by police, following a months long investigation into illegal steroid sales. Atwood was offered a deal by prosecutors, avoiding jail, and cooperating in Operation Raw Deal. The operation lead to arrests of more than 120 people in 2008, and authorities confiscated 11 million steroid doses.

== Death ==
On Sunday, September 11, 2011, at about 2:30pm, Atwood was walking through the pool area of the condominium complex where he lived in Dallas, Texas, when he had a heart attack. Two residents who were at the pool saw him fall in and immediately pulled him out. They were able to revive him and call paramedics, but Atwood died at nearby Baylor Regional Medical Center Hospital in Plano, Texas, aged 37. The coroner's report showed that Atwood died of a massive heart attack. The report also states that Atwood had unknowingly suffered a minor heart attack about a month previously.

== See also ==
- List of male professional bodybuilders
- List of female professional bodybuilders
