= Marja Lehtonen =

Finnish bodybuilder

- ♀ professional bodybuilder

Personal info
- Born: January 9, 1968 (age 57); Tampere, Finland

Best statistics
- Height: 5 ft 2 in (1.57 m)
- Weight: On-season: 114–126 lb (52–57 kg); Off-season: 140 lb (64 kg)

Professional (Pro) career
- Pro-debut: International Federation of Bodybuilders Professional Division (IFBB) Jan Tana Classic; 2001
- Active: Retired since 2010
Medal record
IFBB Ms. Olympia
3rd	2004 IFBB Ms. Olympia	LW
Other IFBB Pro League contests
3rd	2001 IFBB Jan Tana Classic	Lightweight (LW)
2nd	2001 IFBB Women’s Extravaganza	Middleweight (MW)
2nd	2002 IFBB Jan Tana Classic	LW
3rd	2003 IFBB Night of Champions	LW
3rd	2003 IFBB Night of Champions	LW
2nd	2004 IFBB Night of Champions	LW
3rd	2007 Jan Tana Classic	LW

Marja-Leana Lehtonen is a professional female bodybuilder and personal trainer from Finland, born in 1968 in Tampere.

== Background ==
Lehtonen was born in Tampere, Finland in 1968. Always interested in outdoor activities, she joined a sports club in 1983 and became a track athlete. Through training as a sprinter she discovered an interest in weightlifting. After two years of growing interest in bodybuilding, she decided to see if she could compete in the field and entered the Finland National Championship. She won 2nd place in the lightweight category, taking her to the World Championship in Mexico City in 1990, where she finished 7th.

Lehtonen stands 5 ft 2 in (1.57 m) and competes at a weight of 54 kg (120 lb) (her off-season weight is 63 kg (138 lb)). As a teenager she competed as a sprinter before turning to bodybuilding. She gives her best lifts as a curl (EZ-curl-bar) of 68 kg (150 lb) for eight reps, and a bench press of 110 kg (242 lb) for two reps

== Bodybuilding career ==
Marja said she was inspired by seeing muscular track field athletes at a young age to look like them.

She told her friends at gym that after two years she would compete. When she noticed her weight went up fast. This, along the timing and previous comments to her friends, pressured her to compete. She said she came in even ripped at the 2005 Ms. Olympia then at the 2004 Ms. Olympia, in defiance of the so called "20 percent rule", and placed 14th due to that.

=== Contest history ===
- 1990 Pohjanmaa Grand Prix - 1st lightweight (under 52 kg)
- 1990 National Championship (Finland) - 2nd (LW)
- 1990 World Championship - 7th (LW)
- 1991 National Championship - 1st (MW - under 57 kg)
- 1991 European Championship - 7th (LW)
- 1991 World Championship - 14th (MW)
- 1994 World Championship - 4th (MW)
- 1999 World Championship - 4th (MW)
- 2000 European Championship - 2nd (MW)
- 2001 Jan Tana Classic - 3rd (LW)
- 2001 Women’s Extravaganza - 2nd (MW)
- 2002 Jan Tana Classic - 3rd (LW)
- 2003 Night of Champions - 3rd (LW)
- 2004 Night of Champions - 2nd (LW)
- 2004 IFBB Ms. Olympia - 3rd (LW)
- 2005 IFBB Ms. Olympia - 14th
- 2007 Jan Tana Classic - 3rd (LW)
- 2008 Atlantic City Pro - 4th
- 2010 New York Pro - 8th

=== Best statistics ===
- Bench press - 110 kg (242 lb) x 2 reps
- EZ-bicep curls - 68 kg (150 lb) x 8 reps
- Biceps - 43 cm (17 in)
- On-season weight - 52–57 kg (114–125 lb)
- Squats - 54 kg (120 lb) x 100 reps
