= Schömberg, Calw =

Schömberg
- Municipality
- Coat of arms

- Location of Schömberg within Calw district
- Interactive map of Schömberg
- Location within Germany Location within Baden-Württemberg
- Coordinates: 48°47′12″N 8°38′39″E
- Country: Germany
- State: Baden-Württemberg
- Admin. region: Karlsruhe
- District: Calw
- Subdivisions: 5

Government
  - Mayor (2023–31): Matthias Leyn (CDU)

Area
  - Total: 37.21 km^{2} (14.37 sq mi)
- Elevation: 650 m (2,130 ft)

Population (2025-12-31)
  - Total: 7,636
  - Density: 205.2/km^{2} (531.5/sq mi)
- Time zone: UTC+01:00 (CET)
  - Summer (DST): UTC+02:00 (CEST)
- Postal codes: 75328
- Dialling codes: 07084; 07235
- Vehicle registration: CW
- Website: www.schoemberg.de

Schömberg (German pronunciation: [ˈʃøːmbɛʁk]) is a spa town in the north of the Black Forest in Baden-Württemberg.

== Geography ==
Schömberg is located 15 km south of Pforzheim and lies on a plateau between the valley of the Enz with the town of Wildbad to its west and the Nagold valley with the town of Bad Liebenzell to its east.

The municipality of Schömberg includes the communities of Bieselsberg, Schwarzenberg, Langenbrand and Oberlengenhardt.

=== Bieselsberg ===
Bieselsberg lies on a hill at an elevation of 570 m (1,870 ft). There are popular hiking trails in the surrounding fir forests. Bieselsberg has bus connections to Schömberg and Pforzheim.

=== Schwarzenberg ===
Schwarzenberg lies at 620 m (2,030 ft) in the middle of extensive fir forests with many hiking trails. There is a notable stone circle at its western entrance. Schwarzenberg has bus connections to Schömberg and Pforzheim.

=== Langenbrand ===
Situated north of Schömberg, the spa of Langenbrand extends itself at an elevation between 672 and 730 m (2,205 and 2,395 ft). Attractions include the old village church with its medieval paintings and the eastern choir tower, built during the 11th to 12th century. The "Nordschwarzwaldturm" (North Black Forest Tower) is a 118 m (387 ft) tall television tower which can be seen from all hills of the northern Black Forest. There are currently plans to install up to 6 200m tall wind turbines located next to the population of Langenbrand.

=== Oberlengenhardt ===
The village of Oberlengenhardt is 670 m (2,200 ft) high, and is surrounded by forests with level hiking trails. In clear weather there are scenic views of the Hohenzollern ("Zollernblick") and past the Stuttgart TV Tower up to a rugged view of the Swabian Alb. There are bus connections to Calw, Pforzheim and Wildbad.

=== Charlottenhöhe ===
The Charlottenhöhe is not a district but a former tuberculosis sanatorium, and is situated surrounded by forests. It belongs to the municipality of Schömberg and was established in 1907 as a Volksheilstätte (public sanatorium). It was named after Queen Charlotte of Württemberg.

== Politics ==
=== Municipal Council ===
The results of the June 13, 2004 local election are as follows:

CDU	38,9%	-0,7	10 Seats	-1
FWG	35,9%	+6,5	9 Seats	+1
SPD	25,2%	+3,7	6 Seats	+1
Other	0,0%	-9,5	0 Seats	-2

== History ==
The earliest known historical reference to Schömberg was in 1170.

=== Religion ===
The municipality of Schwarzenberg is home to the Haus des Heils (House of Salvation), an educational institution of the Society of Christian Ecclesia (a member church of the Federal Pentecostal Freechurches).

== Culture and attractions ==
Schömberg is touched by the Black Forest Mittelweg, a scenic long-distance hiking trail from North (Pforzheim) to South (Basel).
