= Kris Dim =

American bodybuilder (born 1973)

- Professional bodybuilder

Personal info
- Born: May 7, 1973 (age 52); Cambodia

Best statistics

Professional (Pro) career
- Pro-debut: California Bodybuilding Campeonatos; 1996

Krisna "Kris" Dim (born May 7, 1973) is an IFBB professional bodybuilder.

His first national bodybuilding competition was the NPC (National Physique Committee) USA Championships, where he took 6th. After many years of hard work, he finally got his "Pro Card" after winning the overall light-heavyweight division in the NPC USA 2003. From there, he began his career as a professional bodybuilder and competed in his first IFBB Mr. Olympia competition in 2004, where he placed 12th. His first Arnold Classic was in 2006, where he placed 14th, followed by his first Ironman Pro Invitational in the same year, where he placed 10th. He also competed in the Mr. Olympia Europe in 2009 where he placed 3rd overall after Ronnie Coleman who was 1st.

Kris has been featured in many fitness and bodybuilding articles, the cover of FLEX magazine and Muscular Development.

== Early life ==
Dim was born in Cambodia. When he was four years old, he and his family moved to Arlington, Virginia. They moved again to Sacramento, California when he was twelve years old. Here is where Kris journey into bodybuilding began he joined a professional gym at the age of fifteen and began to see a transformation very fast as he moved up in strength and size whilst maintaining condition throughout. Two years later, he entered and won his first contest, the teenage division of the North Bay Bodybuilding Championships. He married, dropped out of college, and since then his career has taken off.

== Stats ==
- Height: 5 ft 6 inch
- Competition weight: 185 lb.

== Heart attack and health issues ==
Kris suffered an aortic dissection on June 8, 2007 which nearly took his life. He returned to competition two years later but after another surgery in 2012 he was left paralyzed from the waist down. In 2019 Kris entered the wheel chair division of bodybuilding where he took third place at the Mr. Olympia and 2nd place at the Arnold Classic. Kris has since retired from bodybuilding and resides in Elk Grove, CA, where he is a fitness consultant.

== See also ==
- Arnold Classic
- List of male professional bodybuilders
- Mr. Olympia
