= Mustafa Mohammad =

Jordanian bodybuilder (born 1968)

- Professional bodybuilder
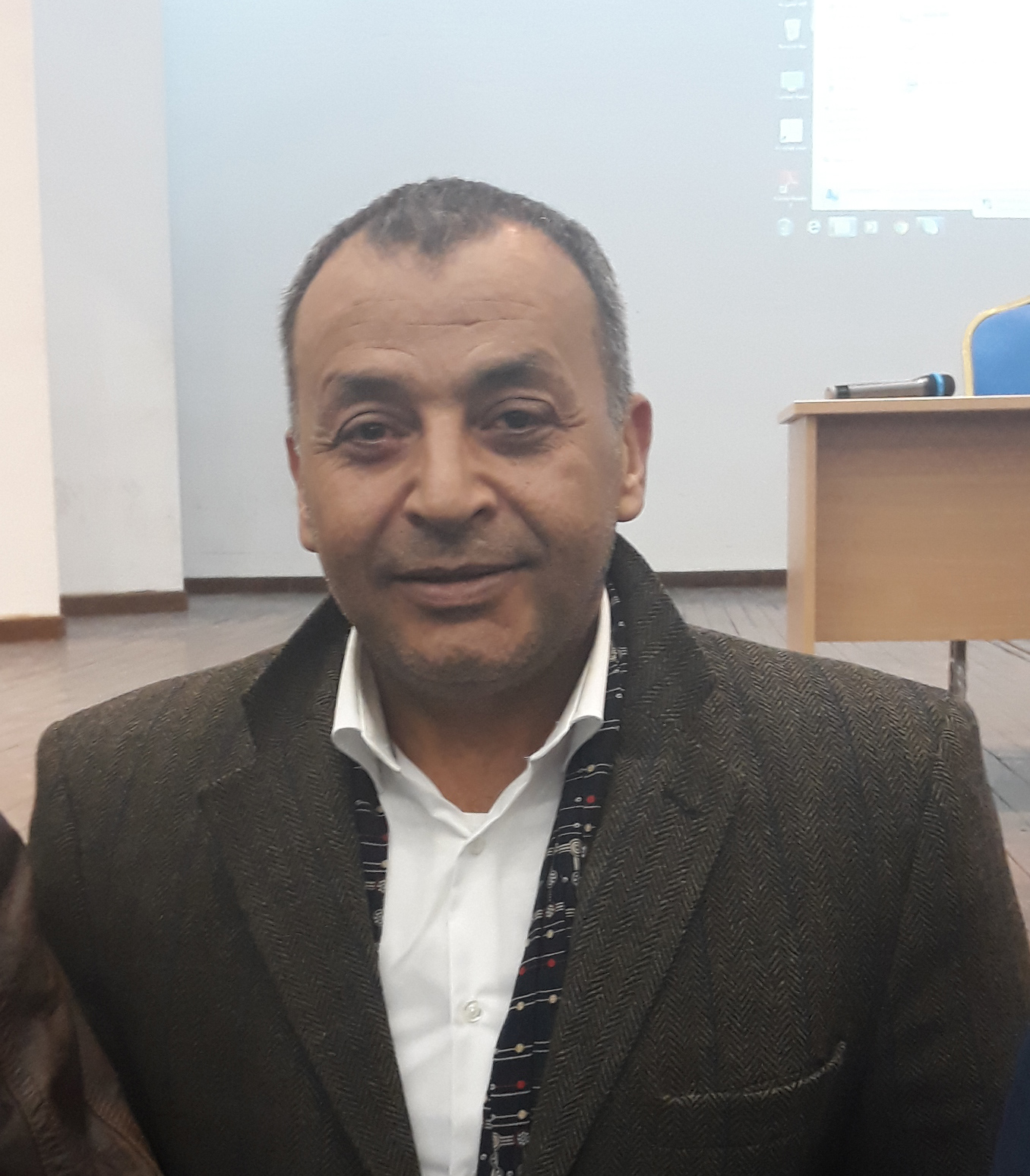

Best statistics

Mustafa Mohammad Hassanen Hussein (born January 3, 1966) is a retired IFBB professional bodybuilder. He came in tenth place in the championship of Mr. Olympia held in Las Vegas in 2005. He was elected in 2013 as Assistant President of the Austrian Federation of Bodybuilding and Fitness, and Assistant to the President of the European Federation of Bodybuilding and Fitness.

== Competitive stats ==
- Age 51
- Height 5'8"
- Contest Weight 270 pounds (120 kg)
- Arm size 21.65 in (55.0 cm)
- Thigh size 32.29 in (82.0 cm)
- Country Jordan
- Olympia History 2004, 17th; 2005, 10th
- Odds 12:1

== Contest history ==
- 1989 World Amateur Bodybuilding Championships, Light-Heavyweight, 11th
- 1991 NABBA Mr Universe, Medium-Tall, 2nd
- 1992 NABBA Mr Universe, Medium-Tall, 1st and Overall
- 1992 Universe ChampionshipsNABBA World Championships, Winner
- 2001 Grand Prix England, Did not place
- 2001 Night of Champions, Did not place
- 2002 Grand Prix Austria, 13th
- 2002 Night of Champions, 12th
- 2002 Toronto Pro Invitational, 7th
- 2003 Grand Prix England, 4th
- 2003 Grand Prix Holland, 3rd
- 2003 Grand Prix Hungary, 8th
- 2003 Night of Champions, Did not place
- 2004 Arnold Classic, 12th
- 2004 Grand Prix Holland, 3rd
- 2004 Mr. Olympia, 17th
- 2004 San Francisco Pro Invitational, 7th
- 2005 Charlotte Pro Championships, 4th
- 2005 Europa Supershow, 5th
- 2005 New York Pro Championships, 10th
- 2005 Mr. Olympia, 10th
- 2006 Arnold Classic, 7th
- 2006 Grand Prix Australia, 4th
- 2006 Ironman Pro Invitational, 6th
- 2006 San Francisco Pro Invitational, 4th
- 2006 Mr. Olympia, 16th (tied)
- 2006 Grand Prix Austria, 9th

== See also ==
- List of male professional bodybuilders
- List of female professional bodybuilders
