= Bodybuilding in Germany =

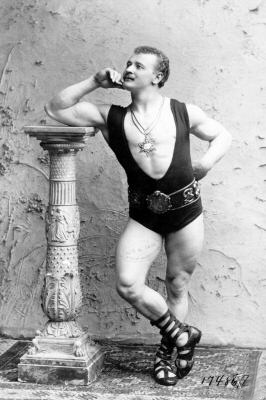
- Eugen Sandow, an early German bodybuilder
- Country: Germany
- National team(s): Germany

Bodybuilding in Germany dates to at least 1812, and was focused around the gymnasium. Later it would develop a national governing organization that was internationally recognised. German competitors have competed in international competitions. Drug testing is done for the national championships.

== History ==
1812 saw the start of Turnverein by Friedrich Ludwig Jahn, which started the tradition of muscle building in Germany focused around the gymnasium. At least 1,500 gymnasiums existed in Germany by the 1870s with muscle mass building a component of what took place in them.

The 1992 edition of the Ms. Olympia contest was held in Chicago, Illinois with 20 competitors, including at least one from Germany. In 2003, the German National Bodybuilding and Fitness Federation was founded by Berend Breitenstein. In 2003, the German National Bodybuilding and Fitness Federation became affiliated with the World Natural Bodybuilding Federation. Frank Guenther won the men's world championship in 2003. In 2004, the German National Bodybuilding and Fitness Federation organized the German National Bodybuilding Championships. Frank Kaeger won the men's world championship in 2007. In 2009, German competitor Sabine Streubel won the WNBF Pro World Championships in the women's category. In 2012, the German National Bodybuilding and Fitness Federation became affiliated with the Drug Free Athletes Coalition and severed its relationship with the World Natural Bodybuilding Federation.

== Drug testing ==
The German National Bodybuilding Championships test competitors using a polygraph, and urine analysis for all winners.

== Governance ==
Germany has an organization that is a member of the European Bodybuilding and Fitness Federation. The country has a national organization that is a recognized by the International Federation of Bodybuilding and Fitness as a national federation, representing the country's bodybuilding community.
