= Crime in the Northern Territory =

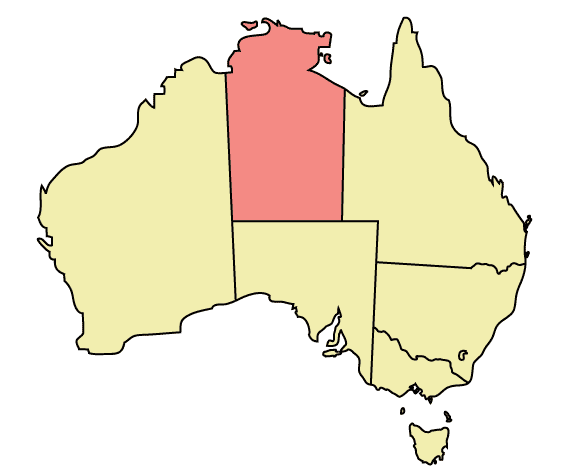
A map showing the location of the Northern Territory in Australia.

Crime in the Northern Territory is managed by the Northern Territory Police (law enforcement), the territory government's Department of the Attorney-General and Justice (courts and adult prisons) and Territory Families (youth justice and youth detention centres).

Figures show that for the 10 years preceding 2015, the Northern Territory (NT) had a consistently higher per capita rate for homicide and manslaughter than other Australian states and territories, as well as a high level of assaults. Most assaults and murders were related to domestic violence, and most of these were alcohol-related. NT also has the lowest population and the highest level of social disadvantage of the states and territories.

Crime is more prevalent in Alice Springs, Katherine and Tennant Creek than in Darwin and Palmerston, despite the latter two being the first and second most populated cities in the Northern Territory, respectively. Alice Springs and Tennant Creek have been ranked as some of the most dangerous places in the world to live.

== Crime across the Territory ==
The Northern Territory Police are responsible for law enforcement, the Department of the Attorney-General and Justice presides over the courts and prisons, and Northern Territory Families runs youth justice and detention centres across the Territory.

Aboriginal people are disproportionately represented as both perpetrators and victims, and many of the victims are women.

Data collated over the 10 years up to 2015 by the Australian Institute of Criminology's National Homicide Monitoring Program showed that the Northern Territory had a consistently higher per capita rate for murder and manslaughter than other Australian states and territories. Most assaults and homicides were related to domestic violence and most of these were alcohol-related.

In September 2016, the level of domestic violence in Aboriginal communities in NT was described as "out of control" by the Northern Territory Coroner, Greg Cavanagh. More than half of homicides and assaults were related to domestic violence and the overwhelming majority of victims were Aboriginal women. He recommended new laws to target and monitor repeat offenders; the use of body cameras by police, with footage able to be used as evidence, so that victims would not always need to appear in court; restricting alcohol supplies; and other strategies.

=== Demographics ===
It also has the lowest population of Australian states and territories, at 245,800 as of December 2018, with many living in very remote areas, and the highest level of social disadvantage and the highest proportion of Aboriginal people of all states and territories, at around 30% of the population in 2016. Much of the population is concentrated in Darwin (148,564), with 98,763 people spread across the rest of the Territory (2018 figures).

=== 2014 Safe Streets Audit ===
The 2014 Northern Territory Safe Streets Audit by the Australian Institute of Criminology and Charles Darwin University's Northern Institute reported findings from previous research as well as the results drawn from focus groups. "Factors that may contribute to heightened levels of fear in the Northern Territory include increased risk of victimisation for both violent and property crime, perceptions that crime is more frequent and serious than it actually is, lower levels of confidence in police and the impact of sensationalist media coverage."

The Audit analysed articles in the Centralian Advocate, NT News and Sunday Territorian for each of the first weeks of May in 2010, 2011 and 2012, which showed that between six and ten percent of news coverage was devoted to crime. Crimes involving violence, especially sexual violence, were over-represented compared with other crime types. Although victims' and offenders' indigeneity were typically not identified, crimes featuring Indigenous offenders and non-Indigenous victims received greater coverage than other crimes in the weeks studied.

However the report noted that fear reduction strategies were not as effective as targeting actual crime and offending. Noting evidence of crime "hotspots", the high incidence of domestic violence and the correlation with alcohol, it said "there is a need to implement evidence-based crime reduction strategies targeting both acute and chronic hotspots, as well as strategies that can reduce alcohol consumption and related harms, reduce the overrepresentation of Indigenous people as victims and offenders of violent crime and respond to high rates of domestic violence".

=== 2017 Riley Review targets alcohol ===
A review in October 2017 by former chief justice Trevor Riley brought about huge changes to the Northern Territory's alcohol policies. The 220 recommendations included a floor price for all alcohol products at A$1.50 per standard drink, the reinstatement of an independent Liquor Commission, a complete rewrite of the Liquor Act (expected to take a year), and introducing licensing inspectors to help police at liquor outlets.

=== Recent trends ===
In the year ending July 2019, the number of reported house break-ins across the Territory had reached its highest level since 2009, after a dip around 2015–6, but commercial break-ins had dropped. The rates in Alice Springs, Katherine and Palmerson were above average, but Darwin was below average. However, all categories of assault had dropped. Alcohol-related assaults were 24.2% below the previous year's figure, and 20% below the long-term average. Domestic-violence-related assault had dropped 11.66% against the previous year, and general assaults had dropped by 15.67%.

Overall, crimes against the person had dropped 14.67% against the previous year, and crimes against property 1.71%. The per capita offending rate had dropped in most categories, with the exception of house break-ins (17.07% up) and motor vehicle theft (0.8% up).

==== Reduction in alcohol-related crime ====
In the 10 months between 1 October 2018, the date that the alcohol floor price of a minimum of A$1.30 per standard drink and various other measures were imposed by the NT government following the Riley Review, and 31 July 2019, there was a 26% decrease in alcohol-related assaults in the Territory. In Alice Springs there was a 43% reduction in alcohol-related assaults and a 38% reduction in domestic violence; Tennant Creek dropped 28% in both categories; and in the Darwin area, alcohol-related assaults 16% and domestic violence by 9%.

== Youth crime and justice ==
In 2017–18 the number of young offenders (i.e. aged 10–17 years old) in NT decreased by 27 offenders, or 4%, over the previous year. The rate per capita of young offenders was marginally higher than Western Australia and New South Wales, at about 2.7 per 100.

Often, a high proportion of the crime is perpetrated by repeat offenders. In Palmerston, up to 20 young people who at any given time regularly commit property and other offences have been identified, and youth represent 73.1% of apprehensions for break-ins. The NT Government created a new three-pronged strategy to target youth crime in the area, which included diversions, building a new youth justice facility and a new police station, and the creation of new recreation facilities and engagement programs. Violent crimes committed by young offenders are of particular concern.

The Youth Justice Court hears charges against young offenders in NT; for particularly serious offences, cases may be transferred to the Supreme Court of the Northern Territory for sentencing.

The Australian Institute of Health and Welfare's Youth justice in Australia 2017–18 report showed that the rate of young people aged 10–17 under supervision orders was highest in the Northern Territory, at 59 per 10,000 (compared with 10 in Victoria), and also for those in detention (15 per 10,000; Victoria, 2 per 10,000).

== By city or town ==
=== Alice Springs ===
==== 21st century background and history ====
Crime has been a significant social issue in Alice Springs in the 21st century, as in most of the rest of the Territory. Aboriginal people are disproportionately represented as both perpetrators and victims, and a high proportion of the victims are women.

In 2007, at the second reading of the Northern Territory National Emergency Response Act 2007, preceding the controversial Intervention by the Howard government, Minister for Indigenous Affairs, Mal Brough, described the Alice Springs Town Camps as "murder capitals". However, two 2009 studies showed that it was lower level-type of offending, such as traffic offences, that was responsible for most crimes committed by Aboriginal people in the NT.

The 2009 crime statistics revealed that violent crime in the town had soared, with reported assaults up 29% on the previous year, the highest number (1432) since statistics had been publicly recorded, and double that of 2004. Alcohol had played a part in about 65% of assaults, and more than half of them were classed as domestic violence. The NT Southern Region Police Commander said that itinerancy, domestic violence and alcohol were the main factors driving up crime rates.

The June 2010 report of the Northern Territory Justice Department's Quarterly Crime & Justice Statistics documented huge increases across multiple categories of crime in Alice Springs in the six years between the 2004 and 2010 reporting periods, largely due to the impact of the NT Police Force's "Violent Crime Reduction Strategy" introduced in 2004, which resulted in more offences being recorded and counted in the stats. Recorded cases of assault rose by 87%, sexual assault offences rose by 97%, house break-ins increased by 64%, commercial premises break-ins by 185%, and motor vehicle theft and related offences by 97% on 2004–05 figures. Compared with the previous reporting year, all categories except for commercial premises break-ins rose significantly.

After a prolonged spike in crime in early 2011, especially break-ins committed by young offenders, concern about the high levels of crime led to a public meeting attended by 250 people in February 2011, organised by a citizens' group called Action for Alice. Aboriginal elder Lindsay Bookie addressed the crowd of mainly white residents, expressing the view that the Intervention of 2007 had caused a lot of bad people from remote communities to move to Alice. Action for Alice put the spotlight on crime using TV advertisements. The over-representation of Aboriginal people in the crime statistics, as both perpetrators and victims, was attributed in part to the movement of people into Alice Springs from remote communities. Aboriginal and Torres Strait Islander Social Justice Commissioner Mick Gooda said that poverty and social dysfunction in the town camps around Alice Springs were part of the cause, and welcomed recent spending by the federal government of A$150 million on housing and social services in the camps. The town camps were notorious for their drinking, violence and substandard living conditions.

In 2012, John McRoberts, Northern Territory Police Commissioner, said that there had been social dysfunction in Alice Springs over 30 years. Stephanie Bell, Director of the Central Australian Aboriginal Congress said that there had been some positive changes brought about by government programs, but "the impact of years of neglect and failure of services and programs is now at a point where it is escalating beyond everyone's capacity, and we have to work collaboratively to address it". Assaults were common in Aboriginal town camps and 95% of people in the town fleeing domestic violence were Indigenous, sometimes filling a shelter housing 900 people. Housing in the 17 town camps, where people from remote communities stay when visiting Alice Springs for medical and other services, was very overcrowded, and the young people were looking for excitement when they came to town.

In February 2013, Tangentyere Council called an emergency meeting of Territory government, police and other stakeholders, to address concerns among Alice Springs town camp residents, who were living in fear caused by alcohol abuse, violence and family feuding. However, several officials walked out. Camp residents later said that they felt abandoned by the Territory government.

In 2015, NT police promised extra patrols for an upcoming sporting event, after the number of youth offenders across the Territory had doubled in the previous year. They would be working with Tangentyere Night Patrol, along with other night patrol teams from across Central Australia, and urged residents to help by reporting crime through the regular channels, after a vigilante group called the Alice Springs Volunteer Force (ASVF) were trying to recruit people with firearms experience on social media. The police had earlier launched Taskforce Neo to try to reduce the rates of youth crime in Alice Springs as well as remote areas. There was a spate of rock-throwing by youths in 2015 and 2016, targeting people, vehicles and buildings.

==== 2017: youth crime concerns ====
At the end of 2017, youth crime was still causing concern in the community, after a series of violent assaults, brawls and robberies perpetrated by youths. At an Alice Springs Council meeting called by local Arrernte elders, former police officer and resident of nearby community Santa Teresa Phillip Alice said that the town was under siege, and that the young troublemakers were not local. The traditional owners said that they had had enough, and that Aboriginal people had to be part of the solution in making the town safe again.

NT Police launched "Operation Shulton" in November, "...to target antisocial behaviour and associated crime". Police would be actively engaging with young people on the streets, and calling on the community to report crime. This was part of the multi-agency "Summer in Alice" campaign, described as "the biggest campaign by an NT government to target kids at risk before they engage in bad behaviour". A$250,000 was being invested in after-hours activities, including transport to get youths home if needed. Additional police were being recruited and trained in Alice Springs. Eight outreach workers from Territory Families Youth Outreach and Re-engagement Team (YORET) would work every night over the summer holidays.

In 2017, the governments of the UK, Germany and Canada issued travel advisories to their citizens travelling in Australia, singling out Alice Springs as a place where extra precautions should be taken. This was despite the fact that common assaults and sexual assaults fell 12.4 and 17.1 per cent respectively in Alice Springs in 2016, and only one of the high-profile attacks on tourists in the 2010s actually took place in the town (a violent robbery and gang-rape; there were three others at other locations in the Territory between 2001 and 2017).

==== 2017–2019 statistics ====
The Alice Springs LGA for which statistics are collected represents about 12% of the NT population. Crime against persons showed a decline of 27.05% between 2017–8 and 2018–9, but at 6074 per 100,000 people, the figure was still nearly three times that of Darwin, at 2379 per 100,000. Crimes against property had risen 12%, at 17,948 per 100,000 (Darwin 8,163). Break-ins were the highest in the Territory, at 2,396 incidents per 100,000 people, which was 57% above the 10-year average (Katherine 1,201; Palmerston 922; Darwin 564).

In the 10 months between 1 October 2018, the date that the alcohol floor price and various other measures were imposed by the NT government following the Riley Review (see above), and 31 July 2019, there was a 43% reduction in alcohol-related assaults and a 38% reduction in domestic violence.

==== 2023 crisis ====
After a series of dangerous incidents involving youths driving stolen cars in late 2022, more police were brought in to the town. In January 2023, prime minister Anthony Albanese visited Alice Springs, meeting NT Chief Minister Natasha Fyles in order to devise a plan to tackle what was dubbed the Alice Springs crime crisis by the press. The Central Australian Aboriginal Congress called for a reimposition of the alcohol bans (imposed under The Intervention from 2007, and then under the Stronger Futures legislation until mid-2022), but instead a plan which included some temporary alcohol restrictions, a review, and increased funding for counter-measures were decided on. Bottle shop trading hours were reduced, with no takeaway alcohol allowed to be sold on Mondays and Tuesdays, and customers limited to one transaction a day.

In 2024, a series of curfews were introduced in Alice Springs to combat crime.

=== Darwin ===
Darwin urban centre consists of Darwin City and the associated suburbs from Buffalo Creek, Berrimah and East Arm westwards, and represents approximately 35% of the Northern Territory's population. It does not include the Palmerston urban area, although both areas fall within the NT Police's Darwin Metropolitan Command. (Palmerston urban centre closely approximates the Palmerston Local Government Area, and represents approximately 13% of the Northern Territory's population.)

Darwin has had lower crime rates than Alice Springs, but Darwin too has had a history of alcohol abuse and violent crime, with 6,000 assaults in 2009, of which 350 resulted in broken jaws and noses – more than anywhere else in the world, according to the Royal Darwin Hospital.

Mitchell Street, with its numerous pubs, clubs and other entertainment venues, was one of the areas policed by the CitySafe Unit, officially launched by the NT Chief Minister Paul Henderson on 25 February 2009, was credited with success in tackling alcohol abuse linked to crime, and the NT police were looking at establishing a specialist licensing enforcement unit in 2010.

The First Response Patrol, run by Larrakia Nation, which helps to move homeless Indigenous women out of dangerous situations, was credited with the fall in sexual assaults in 2009. The service operates every day from 5am to 2am.

==== Recent trends ====
In the 10 months between 1 October 2018, the date that the alcohol floor price and various other measures were imposed by the NT government following the Riley Review, and 31 July 2019, alcohol-related assaults dropped by 16% and domestic violence by 9% in the Darwin area.

The rate of offending in most categories of crime dropped in the Darwin area between 2018 and 2019, with the notable exceptions of motor vehicle theft and break-ins (both up about 12%).

Apart from sexual assault, which rose from 21 to 46, all other categories of crime showed drops in Palmerston.

In 2019, Darwin was ranked as the 50th most dangerous major city in the world by Numbeo. The only other Oceanian cities to make the list were Port Moresby in Papua New Guinea (ranked second) and Townsville in Queensland (ranked 65th).

=== Katherine ===
While crime in Katherine is less prevalent than in Alice Springs or Tennant Creek, Katherine is still known to have an increasing crime rate.

In 2017, the estimated homicide rate in Katherine per 100,000 people was 47.1, which was higher than the same statistic for the United States as a whole.

=== Tennant Creek ===
Tennant Creek is consistently ranked as one of the most disadvantaged and dangerous towns in Australia.

In 2017, the estimated homicide rate in Tennant Creek per 100,000 people was 59.6, which was over 11 times as high as the same statistic for the United States as a whole.

In 2022 and 2023, there were 2,261 crimes reported in Tennant Creek, despite the town's small population. According to police statistics, there was an increase in every crime except sexual assault.

== Statistics ==
=== Northern Territory Police statistics, 2022–23 ===
Crimes reported by city or town, 1 January 2022 – 30 November 2023
| City/town | Crimes |
|---|---|
| Alice Springs | 11,893 |
| Darwin | 11,236 |
| Katherine | 3,855 |
| Nhulunbuy | 335 |
| Palmerston | 3,720 |
| Tennant Creek | 2,261 |
| Other areas | 11,686 |

== Notable crimes ==
There are several massacres of Indigenous people recorded within what is today the Northern Territory, both before and after federation, which would be today regarded as crimes.

- 1 August 1933 – Constable Albert McColl murdered; Dhakiyarr Wirrpanda sentenced to death in a controversial trial; sentence later overturned by the High Court in a case known as Tuckiar v The King.
- 15 November 1972 – Ansett Airlines Flight 232 from Adelaide to Alice Springs with 28 passengers and a crew of four, hijacked, followed by a gun battle at Alice Springs Airport where the hijacker, Miloslav Hrabinec, shot himself and later died.
- 5 January 1977 – Connellan air disaster: murder-suicide when a sacked pilot deliberately flew a light aircraft into Connair building, Alice Springs airport
- 1980 - Baby Azaria Chamberlain was killed by a dingo near Uluru but police charged her parents. Later, an investigation proved their innocence.
- 23 June 1983 – Martin Leach stabbed Charmaine Ariet to death and stabbed, raped and killed her cousin Janice Carnegie.
- 18 August 1983 – Douglas Crabbe rammed his 25-ton Mack truck into a motel bar at the base of Uluru, killing five people.
- 1999 – Rodney Ansell, inspiration for the 1986 film, Crocodile Dundee, killed Sergeant Glen Hutison before being killed by police.
- March 2004 – Drowning murder of Thai sex workers: Phuangsri Kroksamrang and Somjai Insamnan were bound and thrown into the Adelaide River, where they drowned, by teenagers Ben William McLean and Phu Ngoc Trinh.
- 2 February 2010 – Bombing of Darwin shopping mall: a disgruntled customer used a trolley based device and bombed the Territory Insurance Office in Darwin City injuring 15.
- 5 June 2019 – Darwin shooting: four people killed and another injured during a shooting spree by a Darwin man.

=== Tourist attacks ===
- July 2001 – Peter Falconio disappearance, near Barrow Creek: British tourist disappears on 14 July 2001
- April 2012 – Three teenagers rob and subsequently gang-rape a Finnish and German tourist at gunpoint in Alice Springs.
- December 2016 – French tourist stabbed to death at roadside rest area at Connor Well, about 100 kilometres (62 mi) north of Alice Springs.
- August 2017 – Two German tourists raped in Katherine.

== See also ==
- Alice Springs Correctional Centre
- Alice Springs Juvenile Holding Centre
- Barkly Work Camp
- Berrimah Prison (closed November 2014)
- Darwin Correctional Centre
- Don Dale Youth Detention Centre
- Doug Owston Correctional Centre (Darwin Correctional Centre from November 2014)
- Indigenous Australians and crime
- Juvenile detention in the Northern Territory
- Northern Territory National Emergency Response ("The Intervention", 2007)
- Northern Territory Police
- Punishment in Australia
