= Alice Springs Youth Detention Centre =

Prison in Northern Territory, Australia

- Interactive map of Alice Springs Youth Detention Centre
- Location: Alice Springs, Northern Territory; 23°51′30″S 133°47′57″E
- Status: Operational
- Security class: Maximum, for juvenile males and females
- Capacity: 10
- Opened: September 1998
- Managed by: Northern Territory Correctional Services

The Alice Springs Youth Detention Centre formerly known as Alice Springs Juvenile Holding Centre is an Australian medium to maximum security prison for juvenile males and females located in Alice Springs, Northern Territory, Australia.

== Facilities ==
The centre was designed for use as a short-term holding and remand centre for up to four days, and could originally hold up to ten juveniles of either sex; longer remand periods or sentences were moved to Don Dale Juvenile Detention Centre in Darwin.

Expansion and re-configuration of the facility allowed for longer-term detention of up to 18 detainees: a maximum of 15 males in eight rooms, and up to three females in three rooms in a separate wing. However by 2018 there was overcrowding at the facility, with 24 youths held there. Improvements made after the Royal Commission into Juvenile Detention had been made, including provision for school lessons; however in June 2019 it was found that the Centre was failing to provide nearly half of the classes.

== Four Corners program ==
Graphic footage of repeated abuse of children at Don Dale Juvenile Detention Centre and in Alice Springs was featured in ABC's Four Corners episode "Australia's Shame", which aired on 25 July 2016. The program also showed a 17-year-old boy shackled and hooded in a chair in Alice Springs (adult) correctional centre. The UN High Commissioner for Human Rights said it was "shocked" at the "appalling treatment" of the detainees, which violates the Convention against Torture and Other Cruel, Inhuman and Degrading Treatment, to which Australia is party.

Following national outrage, Prime Minister Malcolm Turnbull announced a Royal Commission into Juvenile Detention in the Northern Territory. John Elferink was sacked as Corrections Minister the morning after the program aired. The corrections and justice portfolios were taken on by Northern Territory Chief Minister Adam Giles. Use of restraint chairs and spithoods were then suspended.

== Notable people ==
- Dylan Voller

== See also ==
- Alice Springs Correctional Centre
- Crime in the Northern Territory
- Juvenile detention in the Northern Territory
