= Jerod =

Jerod is a given name. Notable people with the given name include:

- Je'Rod Cherry (born 1973), American football player
- Jerod Draper (died 2018), American overdose victim
- Jerod Evans (born 1994), American football player
- Jerod Elcock (born 1998), Trinidadian athlete
- Jerod Haase (born 1974), American college basketball coach
- Jerod Kruse, American football coach
- Jerod Mayo (born 1986), American football player and coach
- Jerod Mixon (born 1981), American actor
- Jerod Swallow (born 1966), American ice dancer
- Jerod Impichchaachaaha' Tate (born 1986), Chickasaw composer and pianist
- Jerod E. Tufte (born 1975), American judge
- Jerod Turner (born 1975), American golfer
- Jerod Ward (born 1976), American former professional basketball player
- Jerod Zaleski (born 1989), Canadian football player

== See also ==
- Jared
- Jerrod
- Terrance Jerod Ford (born 1983), American basketball player
- Andrew Jerod Hoxie (born 1986), American soccer player
- Reginald Jerod Jackson (born 1973), American basketball player
- Tony Jerod-Eddie (born 1990), American football player
- Travaris Jerod Robinson (born 1981), American football player and coach)
