= List of killings by law enforcement officers in the United States, October 2018 =

This is a list of people reported killed by non-military law enforcement officers in the United States in October 2018, whether in the line of duty or not, and regardless of reason or method. The listing documents the occurrence of a death, making no implications regarding wrongdoing or justification on the part of the person killed or officer involved. Killings are arranged by date of the incident that caused death. Different death dates, if known, are noted in the description. The table below lists 84 people.

== October 2018 ==
| Date | Name (and age) of deceased | Race | State (city) | Description |
|---|---|---|---|---|
| 2018-10-31 | John Wurms (32) | White | Port Orange, FL | |
| 2018-10-31 | Gonzalo Rico-Jimenez (26) | Hispanic | North Las Vegas, NV | |
| 2018-10-31 | Jose Centeno, Jr. (17) | Hispanic | Texas (Houston) | |
| 2018-10-29 | Billy Jo Johnson (34) | White | South Lake Tahoe, CA | |
| 2018-10-29 | Albert Ramon Dorsey (30) | Black | Los Angeles, CA | |
| 2018-10-29 | Arnaldo Caraveo (27) | Hispanic | Arizona (Phoenix) | |
| 2018-10-29 | Derek Dupard (30) | Unknown race | Arizona (Tempe) | |
| 2018-10-29 | Ida Christy Stiles (42) | White | Barnesville, GA | |
| 2018-10-29 | Derrick Alexander Sellman (28) | Black | Parkville, MD | |
| 2018-10-27 | Lloyd Gerald Napouk (44) | Native American | Las Vegas, NV | |
| 2018-10-27 | Christopher Carroll (30) | Black | Kingwood, TX | |
| 2018-10-25 | Armand Lamont Beckwith-Bell (28) | Black | St. Louis, MO | |
| 2018-10-24 | Joshua Jay Langley (28) | White | Sioux Falls, SD | |
| 2018-10-24 | Name Withheld (45) | Unknown race | Michigan (Detroit) | |
| 2018-10-23 | Nickolas Michael Peters (24) | White | Martha Lake, WA | |
| 2018-10-23 | Robert R. "Bobby" Mitchell (27) | White | Davenport, IA | |
| 2018-10-23 | Shaunday Nathaniel Mullins (37) | White | Tulsa, OK | |
| 2018-10-22 | Jason Whittle (26) | White | Riverton, UT | |
| 2018-10-22 | Tafahree Maynard (18) | Black | Snellville, GA | |
| 2018-10-22 | William David Williamson (61) | White | Newport, TN | |
| 2018-10-22 | Salvador Morales (37) | Hispanic | Pittsburg, CA | |
| 2018-10-21 | Name Withheld | Unknown race | Quincy, FL | |
| 2018-10-21 | Cedric Pritchard (27) | Black | Washington, NC | |
| 2018-10-20 | Robert Smith Jr. (50) | White | Spanaway, WA | |
| 2018-10-20 | Kimberly Norris (34) | White | McBee, SC | |
| 2018-10-20 | Edward Paul Zumski III (35) | White | Paris, TX | |
| 2018-10-19 | Christopher Calabro (25) | White | Brockton, MA | |
| 2018-10-19 | Jonathon C. Tubby (26) | Native American | Green Bay, WI | |
| 2018-10-18 | Andrey Tkachenko (23) | White | Salt Lake City, UT | |
| 2018-10-18 | Bailey Greek (18) | White | Wheat Ridge, CO | |
| 2018-10-18 | Jacob Servais (19) | Black | Vineland, NJ | |
| 2018-10-18 | Sean Dutcher (38) | White | Elkhorn, WI | |
| 2018-10-18 | Neico Crooks (21) | Black | Florida (Miami Gardens) | Crooks was shot and killed after being confronted by officers while driving a car that was reported stolen. |
| 2018-10-18 | Kenneth Martin Anderson (27) | White | Cartersville, GA | |
| 2018-10-18 | Mahlon Edward Summerour (63) | Black | Monroe, GA | |
| 2018-10-17 | Daniel Paul Lehman (34) | White | Quinlan, TX | |
| 2018-10-17 | James Lyle Kuehn (61) | White | Kearns, UT | |
| 2018-10-17 | Charles D. "Chop Chop" Roundtree Jr. (18) | Black | San Antonio, TX | |
| 2018-10-17 | Weston Willow Well Cole (29) | White | Longview, WA | |
| 2018-10-17 | Keyshon Parham (19) | Black | Tennessee (Memphis) | |
| 2018-10-16 | Donald Judd (45) | Unknown race | Tacoma, WA | |
| 2018-10-15 | Hustes Antonio Davila (58) | Hispanic | Columbus, OH | |
| 2018-10-14 | Eric Jamar Lupain Stromer (22) | Black | Jeffersonville, OH | |
| 2018-10-14 | James Christopher Manus (41) | White | Gainesville, GA | |
| 2018-10-14 | Gregory Allen Tilly (55) | Unknown race | Alamogordo, NM | |
| 2018-10-14 | Name Withheld | Unknown race | Panama City, FL | |
| 2018-10-14 | Umberto Sanchez Ramoz (17) | Hispanic | Porterville, CA | |
| 2018-10-13 | Samuel Morris (27) | Black | Fort Smith, AR | |
| 2018-10-12 | Venson Kee Yazzie (43) | Native American | Chinle, AZ | |
| 2018-10-12 | Ashley Elisna Grammer (26) | Native Hawaiian and Pacific Islander | Mountain View, HI | |
| 2018-10-12 | Jacob E. Albrethsen (17) | White | Orem, UT | |
| 2018-10-12 | Matthew Chambers (34) | Unknown race | Georgia (Atlanta) | |
| 2018-10-12 | Kay Kenniker (84) | White | Chandler, AZ | |
| 2018-10-11 | Diamonte Riviore (22) | Black | West Jordan, UT | |
| 2018-10-11 | Name Withheld | Unknown race | Huntington Beach, CA | |
| 2018-10-11 | Dakota Brooks (26) | Unknown | Florida (Panama City) | In the aftermath of Hurricane Michael, Brooks attempted to steal a vehicle owned by fire marshals from the Florida Department of Financial Services when two of them confronted him. Video shows Brooks fight with the marshals and attempt to take one of their firearms when the other shot him. The marshal then shot Brooks again as he fled. |
| 2018-10-10 | Kenneth Busse Jr. (21) | White | Nevada (Las Vegas) | Two police officers pulled over Busse's truck, who they suspected was driving impaired and partaking in an earlier hit-and-run. Busse refused to follow police directions and then fled to a nearby bush where he had a concealed handgun and pointed it at the officers, firing one round. The officers responded by firing a total of six shots. Busse was later pronounced dead on arrival, and was suspected of purposely escalating the encounter to cause a suicide by cop. |
| 2018-10-10 | Michael Johnson (26) | Unknown race | Thousand Oaks, CA | |
| 2018-10-10 | Alonzo L. Smith (31) | Black | Milwaukee, WI | |
| 2018-10-10 | Leslie Shayne Miller (49) | White | Sullivan, IN | |
| 2018-10-10 | Austin William Schell (15) | Unknown race | Farmersville, TX | |
| 2018-10-10 | Samuel Edward Rice (30) | White | Oregon (Portland) | |
| 2018-10-10 | Terrell Blake (47) | Black | Rochester, NY | |
| 2018-10-10 | Richard Palafox (76) | White | El Paso, TX | |
| 2018-10-08 | Aaron Joseph Chavez (22) | Hispanic | Clovis, NM | |
| 2018-10-08 | Isaiah Ramirez (36) | White | Tennessee (Oak Ridge) | A sergeant police officer along with 5 police deputies including a K-9 unit approached Ramirez, who had a criminal history, for an outstanding warrant. On seeing the police Ramirez got into his pickup truck and attempted to flee. The officers pursued and eventually cornered Ramirez in a parking lot. When Ramirez attempted to flee one of the officers fired at Ramirez, striking him three times. He died shortly after. Subsequent investigation found Oxycodone, Alprazolam, Amphetamine and Buprenorphine in Ramirez's body and the officer who fired was cleared of wrongdoing. Footage of the incident was released in February 2019. |
| 2018-10-08 | Alexander G. Lindahl (24) | White | Okarche, OK | |
| 2018-10-08 | Travis M. Craven (25) | White | Wellington, CO | |
| 2018-10-07 | Anthony Lee Hodges (39) | White | Lawtey, FL | |
| 2018-10-07 | Nicholas Benjamin Salisbury (36) | White | Auburn, CA | |
| 2018-10-07 | Tison Dinney (39) | Asian | Honolulu, HI | |
| 2018-10-05 | Phillip Samuel Moskios Jr. (48) | White | Chiloquin, OR | |
| 2018-10-05 | Name Withheld | Unknown race | Hayti, MO | |
| 2018-10-05 | Sershawn Martez Dillon (31) | Black | Nashville, TN | |
| 2018-10-04 | Jerod Draper (40) | Unknown | Indiana (Harrison County) | He was arrested for fleeing a traffic stop. While in sheriff's custody, he began showing symptoms of a methamphetamine overdose. Footage showed that guards stripped him naked and placed him in a medical isolation cell. When his condition worsened, he was placed in a restraint chair where guard Sgt. Matt Hulsey and jail nurse Michael Gregory tased him seven times in 15 minutes (including directly over his heart), stepped on his bare feet, and applied pain compliance techniques. No charges were filed; his death was ruled an accidental overdose. but the family received a settlement. |
| 2018-10-04 | William Harold Cox II (45) | Black | Scarbro, WV | |
| 2018-10-03 | Lajuana Phillips (36) | Black | California (Victorville) | Deputies fatally shot her while responding to reports of an assault at a used car lot. |
| 2018-10-03 | Chinedu Valentine Okobi (36) | Black | Millbrae, CA | |
| 2018-10-03 | Toby D. Bailey Sr. (38) | Black | Tennessee (Memphis) | |
| 2018-10-03 | Arthur Harbison (25) | White | Greenville, MS | |
| 2018-10-02 | James Edward Martin (26) | White | Mableton, GA | |
| 2018-10-01 | Nowy Duron (29) | Hispanic | Texas (Houston) | |
| 2018-10-01 | Keagan Lee Johnson-Lloyd (23) | White | Hastings, MN | |
| 2018-10-01 | Brian Baker (33) | White | Orlando, FL | |

== See also ==
- Death in custody § United States
- Henry A. Wallace Police Crime Public Database
- List of cases of police brutality
- List of countries with annual rates and counts for killings by law enforcement officers
- List of law enforcement officers killed in the line of duty in the United States
- List of law enforcement officers convicted for an on-duty killing in the United States
- List of shootings by US immigration agents
- List of police reforms related to the George Floyd protests
- List of unarmed African Americans killed by law enforcement officers in the United States
- Lists of killings by law enforcement officers
- Police brutality in the United States
- Police misconduct § United States
- Police riot § United States
- Police use of deadly force in the United States
