= 2010 Darwin shopping centre bombing =

Bombing attack in Darwin, Australia

Coordinates: 12°27′38″S 130°50′25″E

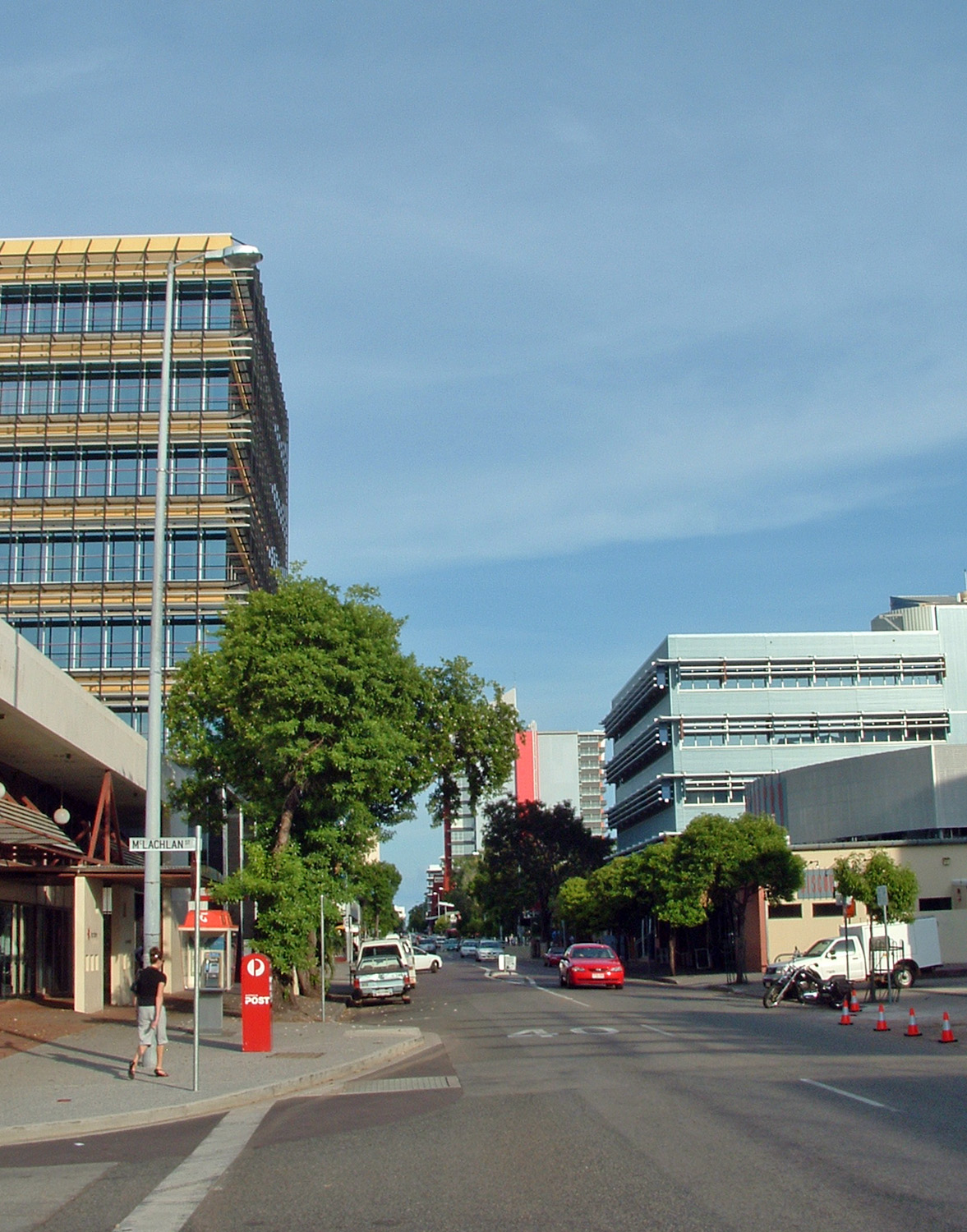
- Mitchell St, Darwin, close to where the explosion took place.
- Location: 47 Cavenagh Street, Darwin, Northern Territory, Australia
- Date: 3 February 2010; 11.00AM – (UTC+9:30)
- Target: Territory Insurance Office
- Attack type: Bombing
- Weapons: Petrol cans and fireworks, loaded in a shopping trolley, which were then ignited by the perpetrator
- Deaths: 0
- Injuries: 19
- Perpetrator: Paul Wayne Clarke
- Charges: Attempted murder Arson; Serious harm with intent Recklessly endangering life

The 2010 Darwin shopping centre bombing was an incident which occurred on 3 February 2010 at the CBD Plaza shopping centre, located at 47 Cavenagh Street in the Darwin CBD. 19 people were wounded, including a police officer.

== Bombing ==
In the lead up to the bombing, it is believed the suspect had made several threats to the office, and as a result security had been stepped up at the office.

The incident occurred at approximately 11:00am local time, when a dissatisfied customer of the local branch of Territory Insurance Office (TIO) pushed a shopping trolley loaded with petrol cans, and large fireworks into the building, where it then detonated, wounding many inside in the branch. The wounded were taken by ambulance to nearby Royal Darwin Hospital. The streets around the area, as well as the shopping mall which also contained a Woolworths outlet, were closed down while emergency services attended the scene. Soon after the incident a local man handed himself to Police.

Despite the obvious shock and horror of the incident, many nearby civilians and passers-by rushed to the scene to help those who had been wounded in the blast. Northern Territory Police Commander Rob Kendrick praised those who ignored their own safety to aid those in need saying:

"I have heard that persons shopping in the vicinity did provide assistance. Those persons are to be congratulated and I certainly applaud their actions."

== Aftermath ==
Paul Wayne Clarke, 44, who had formally changed his name to Bird, handed himself into police soon after the bombing and has been charged with at least nine counts of attempted murder, setting fire to a building, intending serious harm by causing explosion, as well as recklessly endangering life. He was refused bail and appeared at Darwin Magistrates Court on 5 February. On 30 April, he reappeared in court via video link from Berrimah Prison. Bird hanged himself while on remand at Darwin Correctional Centre and died around 1.20pm on 20 January 2011 at Royal Darwin Hospital, at the age of 46.

TIO, then owned by the Northern Territory Government at the time of the incident, was eventually sold to Allianz (insurance assets) and People's Choice Credit Union (banking assets) in November 2014, with all of its physical branches closed in 2016.

=== Group Bravery Citation ===
A Group Bravery Citation was awarded to a group of four men and a police officer who were in first attendance to the scene and helped contain a fire and assisted victims to find their way through smoke and debris immediately following an explosion at the Territory Insurance Office on Cavenagh Street on the morning on 3 February 2010.

For their actions, the recipients were recognised by the award of the Group Bravery Citation:

- Mr Patrick Bellot
- Mr Paul William Bleeker
- Mr Paul Darren Burgess
- Mr Patrick Dunks
- Senior Constable First Class Mark Richard Nancarrow

== See also ==
- 2019 Darwin shooting
- Timeline of major crimes in Australia
- Crime in Australia
- Crime in the Northern Territory
