= Man with No Name (disambiguation) =

The Man with No Name refers to three characters played by Clint Eastwood.

Man with no name may also refer to:

- "Man With No Name", song by Derek Sherinian from his album Blood of the Snake
- "Man With No Name", song by Johnny Hates Jazz from their album Magnetized
- "Man with No Name", song by Wishbone Ash from their album Elegant Stealth
- "Man With No Name", a twelfth-season episode of ER
- Martin Freeland (known as "Man With No Name"), a Goa trance artist
- Edward Leslie (a.k.a. "Ed" Leslie), professional wrestler who wrestled under the ringname "The Man With No Name" in the mid-1990s
- Andrea Jerome Walker, pseudonym for Michael Mvogo, a man currently detained in Canada

== See also ==
- No Name (disambiguation)
