= Youth detention in the Northern Territory =

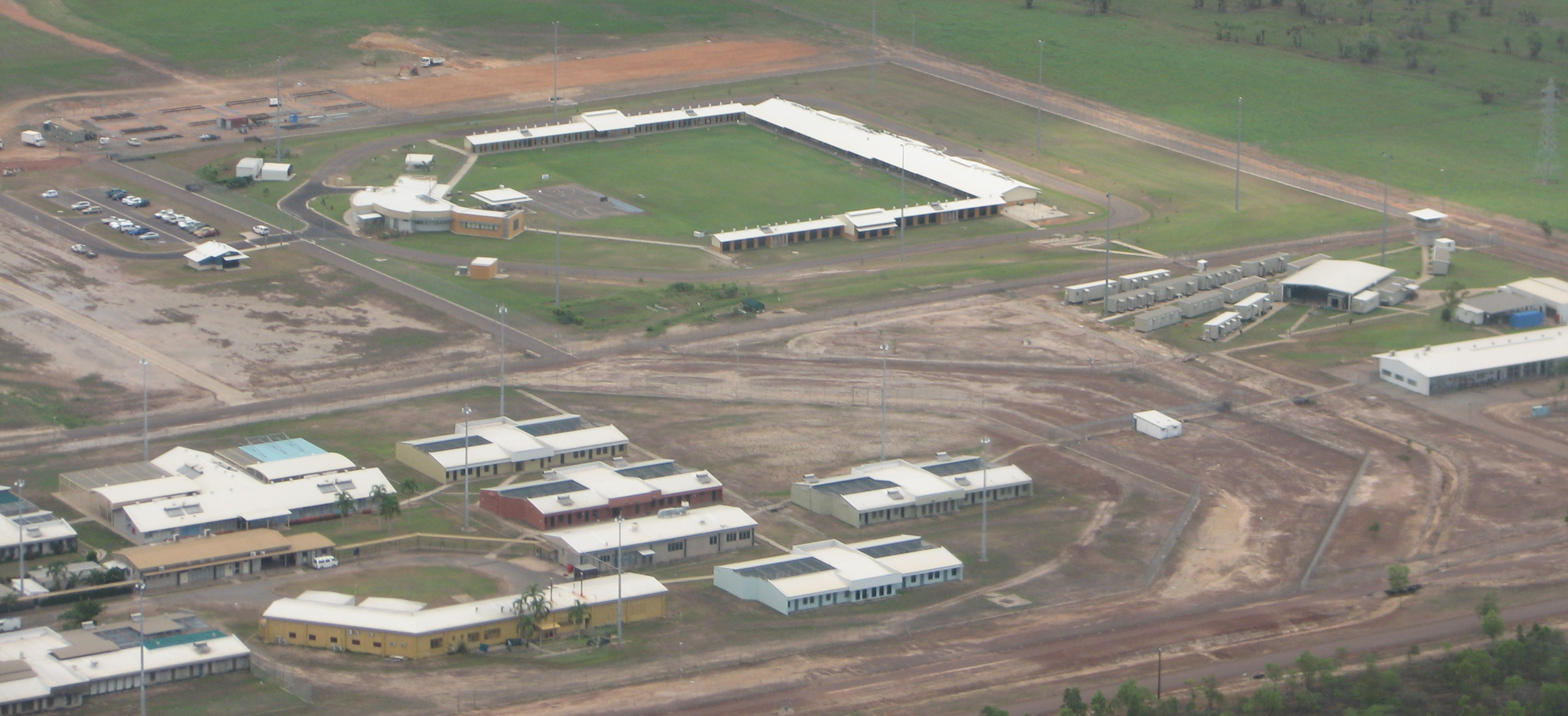
The Don Dale Youth Detention Centre, located in Berrimah, near Darwin, is the largest purpose-built center for juvenile detention in the Northern Territory.

In the Northern Territory, people aged under 17 years pending sentencing or after receiving a custodial sentence are held in youth detention centres. Youth detention is administered by the Department of Correction, with most incarcerated youths being held at either the Alice Springs Youth Detention Centre or the Holtze Youth Detention Centre.

The Northern Territory, as of June 2015, had a juvenile detention rate of 16.7 per 100,000 people – the highest of Australia's states and territories. A report released by the Australian Institute of Health and Welfare in April 2016 showed that in 2014–15 of a national total of 900 juveniles in detention on an average day, 41 were in detention in the Northern Territory. However, in terms of incarceration rates, the Northern Territory overwhelmingly had the highest rate of juveniles in detention of any state or territory. It detained 15.6 in every 10,000 children of that age on an average day. Western Australia had the next-highest rate at 6.1 children detained, while Victoria had the lowest at 1.5.

The youth detention system was the subject of the Royal Commission into the Protection and Detention of Children in the Northern Territory, established by prime minister Malcolm Turnbull on 28 July 2016. The royal commission followed the broadcast of the Four Corners episode "Australia's Shame", which exposed evidence of child abuse within the system. The final report for the royal commission was tabled to the federal parliament on 17 November 2017.

== History ==
=== Early juvenile detention systems ===
A system of criminal punishment for minors had existed in the Northern Territory since the territory's establishment in 1911. Historically, juvenile detention systems operated in the area of Northern Territory as early as settlement in the early 1860s, when the area was in control of the colony of New South Wales and shortly before control of the territory was handed over to South Australia.

=== 20th century ===
Prior to 1970, it was common for juvenile offenders to be transferred to South Australia, due to the lack of available facilities in the Territory. Essington House was established in Darwin in the late 1960s, and was the first and only holding and remand facility for juveniles. However, in their report in 1973, Hawkins and Misner called for the establishment of a juvenile remand centre, and noted that juveniles could be held in jail for up to a week before being transferred to Essington House. In the 1970s, incarcerated youths were sent to adult prisons such as Fannie Bay Gaol. Fannie Bay Gaol operated between from 1883 to 1979, initially housing male and female prisoners, including juveniles. Juveniles were not permitted to associate with adult prisoners and accordingly, they were not permitted to participate in work or education programs. The Report from the Select Committee Appointed to Inquire into Prisons and Prison Legislation (the Ward Report) recommended, inter alia, that alternatives to juvenile incarceration should be investigated. The Ward Report described the treatment of juvenile offenders as a matter of grave concern:

that they should have to be sent to such prisons as those at Fannie Bay and Alice Springs because of the lack of other facilities is a public disgrace. Suitable alternatives should be provided without delay.

Fannie Bay Gaol closed in 1979 and was replaced by the new Berrimah Prison.

In 1984, the Northern Territory Juvenile Justice Act was passed, which defined juveniles to be persons aged 17 and under, and also officially established a Juvenile Court and a Juvenile Justice Review Committee. The Giles House, located in Alice Springs, was opened as the Northern Territory's first juvenile detention center in 1984, implemented with a focus on "providing detainees with life skills and education, thereby ensuring young offenders were not put in prisons; that they did not come under the influence of hardened criminals and that they did not, after being released, follow a life of crime."

In January 1986, based on the recommendations of the Juvenile Justice Review Committee, control of juvenile justice functions were transferred from child welfare services to a newly established Department of Correctional Services. In 1987, an amendment to the Juvenile Justice Act replaced the Juvenile Justice Review Committee with two boards of management. The Wildman River Wilderness Work Camp was also established in 1987 as a male-only, long-term remand and sentenced detention center with a community service system based on the "Outward Bound" model of providing youths with a series of increasingly challenging tasks. Wildman River was for boys only, as the facilities were not considered suitable for girls.

In 1987, Malak House was approved as a juvenile detention centre in Darwin. The over-representation of Aboriginal juveniles in detention centres was noted as was low education rates and the need to re-engage Aboriginal youths with traditional elders.

The Juvenile Justice Amendment Bill 1990 proposed to authorised the Juvenile Court to order restitution against the parents of a juvenile offender and to order parents to contribute towards the cost of detention of a juvenile. The scheme was not implemented. In 2001, the scheme was back on the agenda in the form of the Juvenile Justice Amendment Act 1991 and the Law Reform (Miscellaneous Provisions) Amendment Act 1991 amending the Juvenile Justice Act.

In 1991, the Malak House, Darwin was replaced by the Don Dale Juvenile Detention Centre, the first purpose-built juvenile detention center, with a higher level of security than Malak House and Wildman Work Camp. Don Dale had a capacity of 22 offenders. In Alice Springs, Giles House, after being closed for two years following the opening of Don Dale Juvenile Detention Centre, was reopened and renamed Aranda House. Aranda House operated between 1989 until early 2011.

In 1993, Police reported that:

In the period 1 July 1991 to 31 December 1992, a total of 3,752 charges were made against 917 juvenile offenders. The vast majority of charges were for offences against property, being 2251 charges, representing 60% of the total laid in this period. Police statistics indicated that the majority of juvenile offenders charged were male, Aboriginal, between 14 and 16 years of age, and resided in the Darwin metropolitan area.

Correctional Services reported that:

The proportion of Aboriginal juveniles sentenced to detention decreased from 89.41% in 1991 to 68.75% in 1992. The percentage of Aboriginal juveniles on remand decreased from 80.11% to 67.85% over the same period. Since February 1987, there has been a 10% reduction in juvenile detention rates, and a reduction of 91% in juvenile imprisonment rates. As with police figures, the vast majority of offences (74%) committed by juveniles on Correctional Services programs were property offences.

In 1997, mandatory sentencing was introduced with amendments to the Sentencing Act and Juvenile Justice Act, with persons aged 15 and 16 now being subject to a minimum detention of 28 days. There was an increase of 53% in the number of juveniles sentenced and detained by June 1998.

=== 21st century ===
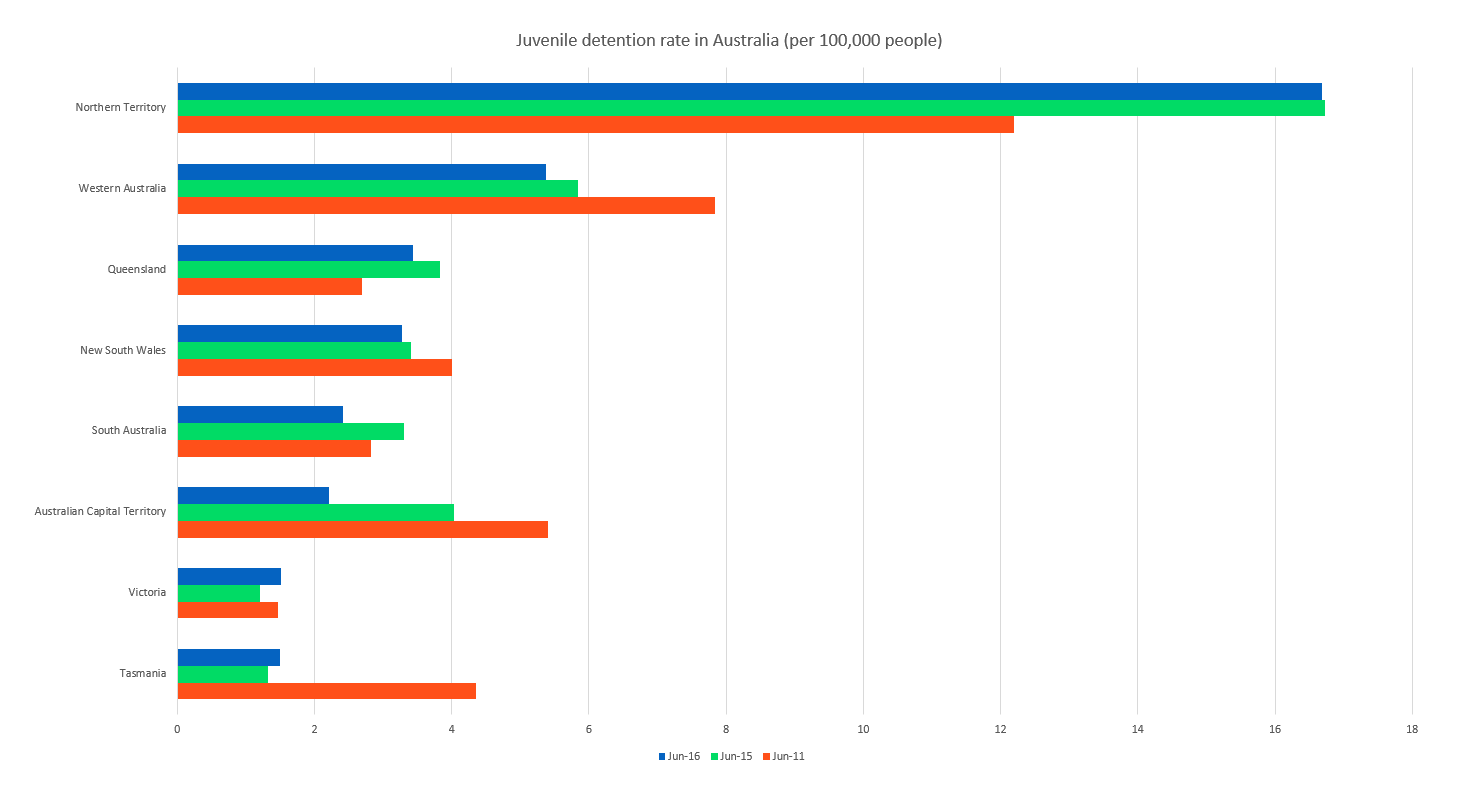
Juvenile detention rates in Australia, by state and territory, in 2011, 2014 and 2015. (Click to enlarge)

When the Labor Party won office for the first time in 2001 it repealed the mandatory sentencing laws, merged Correction Services into the Department of Justice and closed Wildman River Wilderness Work Camp. The Juvenile Justice Act was replaced by the Youth Justice Act 2006, and the Community Welfare Act was replaced by the Care and Protection of Children Act 2008.

By 2015, the Northern Territory had the highest rate of detention of 10–17 year olds in Australia, eclipsing the second highest rate, that of Western Australia, by three times. The Australian Institute of Health and Welfare found that the Northern Territory had an average rate of 16.7 per 100,000 people staying each night in youth detention centers, compared to Western Australia's 5.4 per 100,000 people. The Don Dale Juvenile Detention Centre was penned to close down after an incident in August 2014 when a detainee escaped his cell, leading to prison authorities using tear gas. The facility, however, was not closed, and still operates to this day.

Another proposal not followed through was put forward in June 2015 by the then-Minister for Correctional Services John Elferink to send young offenders to adult prison, without the approval of a court.

=== Reports of child abuse, Royal Commission ===
Throughout 2015 and 2016, allegations of staff violence and child abuse surfaced, including reports of detainees being assaulted, stripped naked, and "caged up like animals". A particular allegation of detainees being forced to eat feces for staff social media posts and forced to fight each other for junk food attracted significant media attention in Australia in September 2015. Further allegations of use of excessive force, such as the use of tear gas in the August 2014 incident at Don Dale, came to attention.

In July 2016, the ABC investigative journalism and current affairs program Four Corners broadcast the episode "Australia's Shame", which contained previously confidential footage showing detainees at the Don Dale Juvenile Detention Centre being threatened, assaulted, stripped naked and chained to mechanical restraint chairs, sparking national and international attention. Following the broadcast of the episode and the subsequent political fallout, that included the sacking of Minister for Correctional Services John Elferink, the Prime Minister Malcolm Turnbull quickly appointed the Royal Commission into Juvenile Detention in the Northern Territory.

Since a departmental reorganisation following the Labor victory at the August 2016 Northern Territory general election, responsibility for youth detention facilities was taken over from Correctional Services, by Territory Families.

== Facilities ==
As of October 2019 there are two youth detention facilities operated by Territory Families:

- The Alice Springs Youth Detention Centre, located in Alice Springs, houses up to 18 male and female detainees from Alice Springs and surrounding regions.
- The larger Don Dale Juvenile Detention Centre, located in Berrimah, has a capacity of 38, and operates "a structured program of behavioural management and case management of detainees in support of offender rehabilitation that includes post release options." Prior to the closure of the Wildman River Wilderness Work Camp in the early 2000s, Don Dale had a capacity of 24, with 4 reserved for females. In July 2016, 33 youths were detained at Don Dale.

== Alternative pathways ==
=== Seven Emu Station ===
Seven Emu Station is a working cattle station which has been in the Shadforth family since Garawa man Willie Shadforth bought it outright for cash in 1953. Willie passed on the property to his son Frank, who now looks after guests, while Frank's son Clarry and his children manage the cattle station. Willie had maintained his traditional culture, such as in ceremonies and law, and passed his knowledge down to Frank.

Frank began a self-funded program in the 2010s to help give Aboriginal boys and girls who have been in trouble a second chance in life, teaching them skills such as catching bulls, building fences and mustering. In mid-2020, the Northern Territory Government started funding for the program, committing A$4.5 million to run youth camps over the following five years. There will be a series of intensive short-term camps and longer ones. Dale Wakefield, the NT Minister for Territory Families, said that the camps "not only focus on personal responsibility and consequences, but they will also give young people a way out of crime by connecting them with practical learning, vocational education training and work programs". Permanent accommodation will be built for residents of the long-term camps, who will be youths struggling to get out of the juvenile justice system in the Northern Territory.

== See also ==
- Age of criminal responsibility in Australia
- Crime in the Northern Territory
- Punishment in Australia
- List of Australian prisons
