= Caro Meldrum-Hanna =

Australian investigative journalist

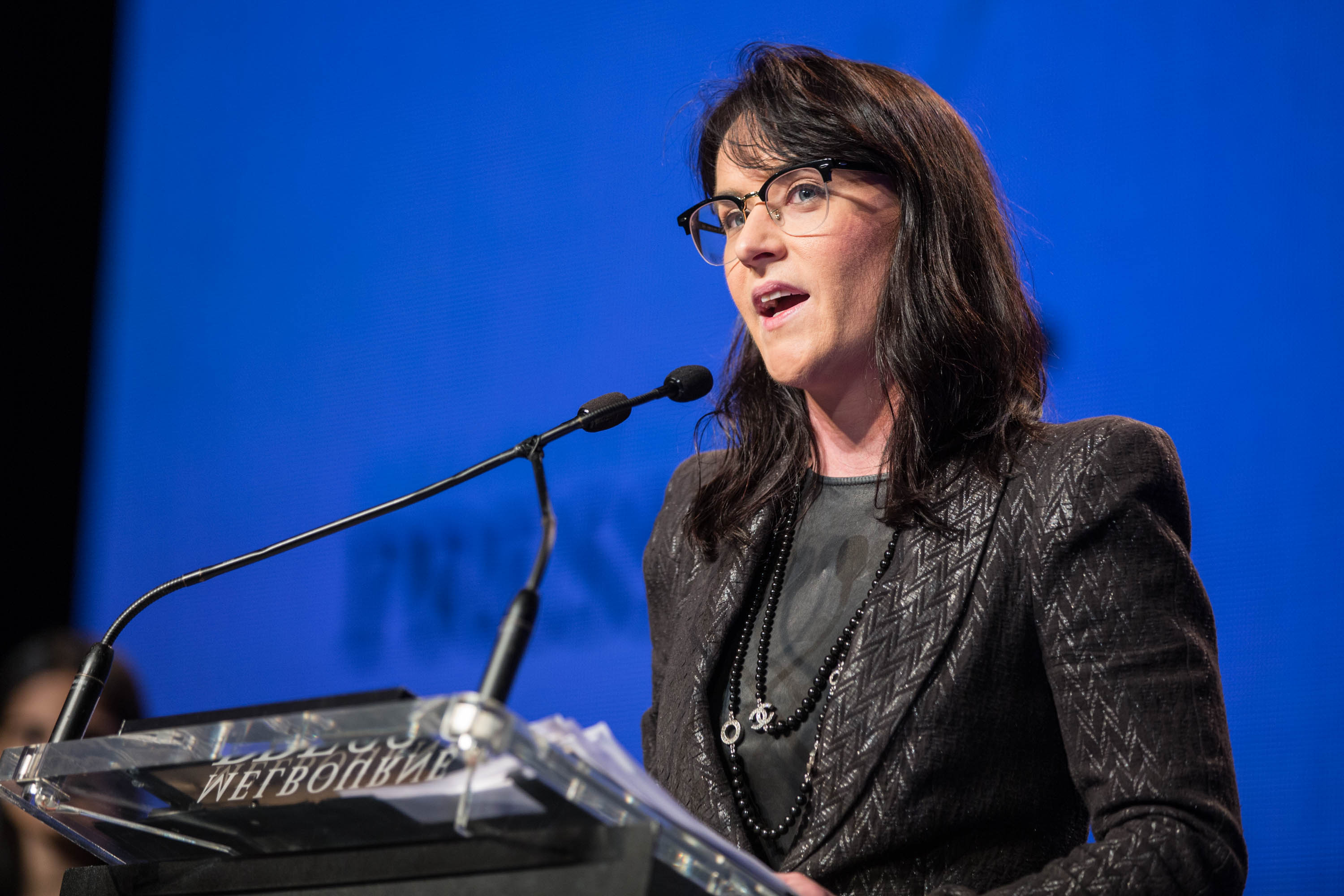
- Meldrum-Hanna accepts Perkin Award at Melbourne Press Club Quills, March 2017.

Caro Meldrum-Hanna is an Australian investigative journalist.

Meldrum-Hanna is best known for her work with ABC Television's Four Corners program.

Among Meldrum-Hanna's stories on Four Corners, two notable reports are an investigation into the treatment of juveniles at the Don Dale Youth Detention Centre entitled "Australia's Shame" and an investigation into a greyhound racing live baiting scandal entitled "Making a Killing".

For "Making a Killing", Meldrum-Hanna was the co-recipient of the 2015 Gold Walkley, shared with producer Sam Clark and researcher Max Murch.

Also in 2015, she won Journalist of the Year at the Kennedy Awards.

Meldrum-Hanna is also known for a three-part ABC documentary which aired in 2018, Exposed: The Case of Keli Lane, which explored the case of waterpolo player Keli Lane, who was convicted of murdering her newborn daughter in 1996.

In 2015, Meldrum-Hanna spoke of the tribulations of being a female journalist covering sporting issues, recalling an alleged incident in which two male radio presenters in Adelaide insinuated during a live interview that she must have had a sexual relationship with sports scientist Stephen Dank for him to have granted her an interview during the Essendon Football Club supplements saga when he had refused other interview requests. According to Meldrum-Hanna, an apology was offered which she refused.

In 2021, Meldrum-Hanna produced a documentary Exposed: The Ghost Train Fire about the 1979 Sydney Ghost Train fire. The documentary contained allegations about corruption of former premier Neville Wran which were challenged by leaders from both sides of the political spectrum as 'unfair, uncorroborated and stretching credulity'. However, the rest of the program's thesis - including that Abe Saffron was involved in the fire, and that this was covered up by NSW Police - was upheld by the review.

Meldrum-Hanna is a graduate of the University of Technology Sydney.

She left the ABC in 2023 for unknown reasons and has kept out of the public eye since.

== Awards ==
- UTS Alumni Award for Excellence, 2017 - Faculty of Arts and Social Sciences
- Logie Award for Most Outstanding Public Affairs Report, 2016
- Walkley Award winner, 2016, Jackson and Lawler
- Melbourne Press Club Graham Perkin Australian Journalist of the Year, 2016, for Don Dale Youth Detention Centre coverage
- Journalist of the Year, 2015, Kennedy Awards
- Gold Walkley Award winner, 2015, Making a killing (with Sam Clark and Max Murch)
- Walkley Award winner, 2013, The Essendon Files, Demons in Damage control, The Cronulla Files
- Walkley Award winner, 2011, Harness racing under scrutiny
