= Alice Springs Correctional Centre =

Prison in Northern Territory, Australia

- Location within Northern Territory
- Location: Alice Springs, Northern Territory; 23°51′30″S 133°47′57″E
- Status: Operational
- Security class: Medium to maximum
- Capacity: 400
- Opened: 1996
- Managed by: Northern Territory Correctional Services
- Website: https://nt.gov.au/law/prisons/alice-springs-correctional-centre

Notable prisoners
- Bradley John Murdoch, Dylan Voller

The Alice Springs Correctional Centre, an Australian medium to maximum security prison for males and females, is located 25 kilometres (16 mi) outside Alice Springs, Northern Territory, Australia. The centre is managed by Northern Territory Correctional Services, an agency of the Department of Justice of the Government of the Northern Territory. The centre detains sentenced and charged felons under Northern Territory and/or Commonwealth law.

== Facilities ==
It has a total capacity for 470 inmates in a variety of security classifications. The centre serves as the main maximum security prison for the Northern Territory. Within a secure compound, up to 316 inmates are accommodated. In a low security environment, located outside the main perimeter fence, 84 units operate with minimal supervision.

An active art program at the centre enables inmates to develop art and business skills. All proceeds from the sale of art works go to victims of crime and support prison programs.

== History ==
In 1992, 87 hectares (210 acres) of land was excised from the Owen Springs pastoral lease to create the site for the centre. The centre opened in 1996 and received all of the inmates from the former Her Majesty's Gaol and Labour Prison in Alice Springs.

== Notable prisoners ==
- Bradley John Murdoch – sentenced to life imprisonment for the 2001 murder of English backpacker Peter Falconio. Murdoch died in Alice Springs Hospital on 15 July 2025, aged 67.
- Dylan Voller – teargassed by prison officers before being shackled in a restraint chair by his neck, ankle and wrists and forced to wear a spit hood.

== See also ==
- Alice Springs Juvenile Holding Centre
- Crime in Alice Springs
