= Spit hood =

Restraint device

A spit hood, spit mask, mesh hood or spit guard is a restraint device intended to prevent a person from spitting or biting. The use of the hoods has been controversial, as they are a potential suffocation risk.

== Justification for use ==
Proponents, often including police unions and associations, say the spit hoods can help protect personnel from exposure to serious infections like hepatitis and that in London, 59% of injecting drug users test positive for hepatitis C. According to Occupational Safety and Health Administration regulations in the United States, saliva is considered potentially infectious for hepatitis C, HIV and other bloodborne pathogens only if visible blood is present.

== Opposition to use ==
Several studies have concluded that the risk of transmission of disease from spitting was low.

The spit hoods have been criticised for breaching human rights guidelines. Critics describe the hoods as primitive, cruel, and degrading.

There is a risk of death. According to The New York Times, spit hoods have been involved in several deaths in law enforcement custody.

== Use around the world ==
=== Australia ===
The use of spit hoods and restraint chairs at the Don Dale Youth Detention Centre in the Northern Territory, Australia, led to the establishment of the Royal Commission into the Protection and Detention of Children in the Northern Territory.

The Australian Federal Police (AFP) banned the usage of spit hoods in 2023. While the ban was welcomed by the Australian Human Rights Commission (HRC), there was backlash from the Australian Federal Police Association (AFPA).

Five years after the death of Aboriginal man Wayne Fella Morrison in custody in South Australia in September 2016, the use of spit hoods was banned in the state. South Australia remains the only state to legislate the ban on spit hoods, with a bill to ban spit hoods tabled in New South Wales parliament in 2023. Morrison's family led the state-wide campaign to establish 'Fella's Bill', now extended into the National Ban Spit Hoods Coalition. Spit hoods are also banned in the Australian Capital Territory (ACT). In Queensland, the use of spit hoods is banned in watchhouses but not in correctional facilities such as prisons and youth detention centres. In Western Australia, they are still used by police and in prisons but are banned in youth detention centres. There have also been calls for a formal ban the use of spit hoods in the Northern Territory, where they are banned by institutions such as youth detention centres despite no legislation prohibiting them. While not formally banned, spit hoods are not used by police in New South Wales, Tasmania and Victoria.

While the use of spit hoods is opposed by police forces in Australia, their usage is still supported by several police unions.

=== New Zealand ===
New Zealand does not ban the usage of spit hoods and their usage has grown. In 2011, they were used by police twelve times, compared to 257 times in 2019, a 2,000% increase in eight years.

=== United Kingdom ===
Some British police chiefs have privately expressed concerns that the hoods are reminiscent of those used at the Guantanamo Bay detention camp. A decision by the Metropolitan Police Service to start using spit hoods was condemned by the human rights group Amnesty International, the civil rights group Liberty and the campaign group Inquest. Many major British police forces have chosen not to use spit hoods.

=== Canada ===
In 2016, a spit hood was used shortly prior to the death of Soleiman Faqiri in the Central East Correctional Centre in Kawartha Lakes, Ontario. In 2023, Faqiri's death was ruled a homicide. In 2021, 21-year-old Nicous D'Andre Spring was pepper sprayed while wearing a spit hood during his illegal detainment in Bordeaux jail in Montreal and died the following day. Quebec police and the Chief coroner's office began an investigation and public inquiry in to his death in 2023.

== See also ==
- Muzzle (mouth guard)
- Restraint chair
