= Dylan Voller =

Australian man

Dylan Voller (born 24 September 1997) is an Aboriginal-Australian rap artist who came to public attention after his detainment in a youth detention center in the Northern Territory was documented on a July 2016 episode of the ABC TV program Four Corners.

== Early life ==
Beginning at age 11 Voller was sent to youth detention multiple times, including for car theft, robbery and assault. He spent time at Don Dale Youth Detention Centre in Darwin, Alice Springs Youth Detention Centre and, aged 17, at Alice Springs adult prison. At various points between 2010 and 2015, Voller was mistreated by youth detention staff, being restrained by the neck, physically thrown into his cell, held in isolation, stripped naked and tear gassed.

== Royal Commission ==
Footage of Voller shackled to a restraining chair within the adult Alice Springs correctional center was featured on the ABC TV program Four Corners' episode "Australia's Shame" in July 2016. It prompted Prime Minister Malcolm Turnbull to announce a royal commission into the treatment of youth in the child protection and youth detention systems in the Northern Territory. Mistreatment in youth detention had been widely reported prior to the Four Corners report.

He has publicly apologised for his crimes.

Voller gave limited evidence at the Royal Commission into the Protection and Detention of Children in the Northern Territory in December 2016.

He was released from prison in February 2017 and has been advocating for improved conditions for youth in detention.

In 2017 it was discovered that Voller's confidential files were dumped at the Alice Springs rubbish tip. Footage of Voller was posted on Facebook on a Fairfax media account and derogatory comments were made on the post by others. Voller subsequently sued Fairfax media for defamation. Social Media Consultant Ryan Shelley testified as an expert witness and illustrated that it was within Fairfax media's power to remove the defamatory comments. The Judge ruled that Fairfax media's failure to remove the comments was grounds to hold Fairfax liable for defamation.

In September 2021, the Australian High Court ruled that media companies could be held liable for allegedly defamatory material posted to their social media pages. Voller's case returned to the lower court for determination. This area of law is currently being reviewed by the Attorneys-General of the Federal government and each State and Territory. In response to the decision in Voller's case, the Federal Government has drafted the Social Media (Anti-Trolling) Bill. Which if enacted will clarify defamation law within the context of social media.

== Later life ==
In 2019, the 21 year old Voller plead guilty to staging a bomb hoax at the Commonwealth Games marathon in Gold Coast. On 1 February 2020 Voller was sentenced to a 10-month prison sentence due to an incident in which he jumped on railway tracks, exposed his penis and assaulted a transit guard in Western Australia. Voller also had a warrant issued for his arrest by the Deniliquin Local Court in NSW on 19 June 2020 in relation to an armed robbery that occurred in Moama, NSW in May 2019.
