= Herman Emmanuel Fankem =

Unidentified Cameroonian fraudster (born 1980)

- Mugshot taken in 2013 by the Toronto Police Service following Fankem's arrest for fraud
- Born: Emmanuel (last name unknown) c. September 12, 1980 (age 46); Ivry-sur-Seine, France (claimed, likely Douala, Cameroon)
- Other names: Emmanuel Febibouon; Emmanuel Buon Fébile; Herman Kemté; Joseph James; James Emmanuel
- Status: Incarcerated under an immigration removal order and unidentified for 13 years and 7 months
- Criminal charges: 2007: possession of identity documents improper intention (UK); 2009: possession of articles used in frauds (UK); 2010: using forged documents (France); 2013: fraud, personation (Canada)
- Penalty: 2007: 8 months imprisonment (UK); 2009: 12 months imprisonment (UK, remains a fugitive); 2010: 4 months imprisonment (France, remains a fugitive); 2013: charges suspended (Canada, awaiting deportation)

Herman Emmanuel Fankem (born September 12, 1980) is the main pseudonym used by an unidentified Cameroonian serial fraudster who has refused to identify himself to Canadian authorities since his 2013 arrest for participating in an advance-fee scam. He has been held in immigration custody in the maximum-security Central East Correctional Centre since his arrest and has yet to be identified. He is the longest-serving detainee on immigration charges in Canada.

Fankem claims that he is a French citizen visiting from England. He has been uncooperative in attempts to identify him, sometimes threatening and insulting officers, and has refused to be photographed or fingerprinted. He has used at least ten aliases spanning six countries, all linked to past convictions of fraud, falsifying documents, and impersonation. In 2020, the Ontario Superior Court of Justice determined that he was a Cameroonian national, likely born in Douala with the first name "Emmanuel", and ordered his prolonged detention.

== Early life, identities and crimes ==
The National Police of Cameroon stated that a man with a similar name as Fankem was a clothing vendor near Douala and provided Canadian investigators with pictures of Fankem in his youth and in England. Fankem moved to Britain and was registered to the British Home Office as Cameroonian national Bouon Emmanuel Fébile, born September 13, 1978. Fankem received two Cameroonian passports in 1997 and 2002 with slightly differing names and dates of birth, neither of them with the surname Fankem. One passport lists a name for his father, while the other does not; both passports list the same person as his mother.

Fankem was arrested in 2007 in London for using fraudulent documents under the identity of a Haitian national named Joseph James, born July 20, 1979, and was detained by immigration police. He stated that he did not want to stay in the United Kingdom and had already purchased a plane ticket to Canada. He was sentenced to 8 months in prison. Fankem was again arrested in Britain in 2009 under the Cameroonian identity of Herman Kemté, born September 13, 1979, on charges of fraud, and was sentenced to 12 months imprisonment. The same year, police in Paris dismantled a passport forging ring and arrested a man who sold alongside 42 documents, among them a passport under the name Herman Emmanuel Fankem, born September 12, 1980, in Ivry-sur-Seine. Fankem had obtained travel documents in France using a crudely forged birth certificate supposedly issued in 2009 by the civil registry of Ivry-sur-Seine. In 2010, Fankem was arrested in France trying to board a flight to Canada using a forged passport with the name Herman Fankem.

During his detention in France, Fankem signed a sworn statement admitting to purchasing the forged documents for 2,500 euros and claimed his true identity was Emmanuel Febibouon, born September 13, 1978, in Douala. Fankem was released and failed to appear in court. He was sentenced in absentia to four months in prison; a warrant for his arrest remains active in France. His fingerprints were also registered under a different identity in Germany, which Canadian authorities claim they are "not permitted to disclose". The National Police of Cameroon have found no records of anyone named Herman Fankem or Emmanuel Febibouon.

On October 28, 2012, Fankem arrived in Montreal on a flight from Cuba where he claims to have attended his girlfriend's sister's wake. He reserved a room at a Days Inn under a different name and had $3,000 in a bank account in Montreal, where he was given a 10-day travel visa which he overstayed. The same month, Fankem and his associates allegedly began contacting potential victims by responding to their online real-estate advertisements.

Cell phones seized after his 2013 arrest in Canada show text messages between Fankem and his friends and family, none of them addressing him by "Herman" but rather as "Emmanuel" or a diminutive, with his mother calling him "Emanu". Friends contacted by investigators confirmed that Fankem was from Cameroon.

== Arrest in Canada and legal proceedings ==
On April 9, 2013, Fankem was arrested by the Toronto Police Service in connection with a black money scam that defrauded a local property manager out of $450,000 by claiming they had a large sum of stained money coming from South Africa and requested money for a chemical that would uncover the dye. Fankem had four accomplices in the scam, all of whom fled. Police believed that the property manager was not Fankem's first victim in Canada and Toronto police organized a press conference after his arrest.

Fankem was charged with two counts of fraud and one count of personation. The charges were suspended and he was transferred to the Central East Correctional Centre by the Canada Border Services Agency for deportation to France, as Fankem insisted he was French and had no other nationality. During his initial immigration hearing, he claimed to be a French national visiting from England (where he claimed to live), complained about his detention, and requested to face trial on the fraud charges to "settle the allegations" against him. He requested diplomatic assistance from France numerous times, but refused to meet with French diplomats once they arrived. He repeatedly refused any mental health assessments and questioning by Cameroonian authorities.

After law enforcement determined that he used a false identity, Fankem refused to meet with CBSA officers trying to determine his identity and refused to have his photograph or fingerprints taken. Over four and a half years, Fankem refused to attend 51 detention review hearings, each missed hearing extending his detention. Fankem became increasingly agitated, telling the Immigration and Refugee Board to "go to hell" in one hearing before storming off. He threatened and insulted CBSA officers over forty times, claiming that he was "kidnapped" by them.

In June 2018, the IRB unexpectedly ordered Fankem's release, which was overturned by the Federal Court of Canada, who ruled that "the court’s impression is that [Fankem] considers himself to be the director of a play and Canadian authorities are but actors subject to his direction". On June 21, 2019, proceedings related to Fankem were made private as he could "disclose information that would be harmful to his case". The decision was lifted in November. The IRB barred press coverage of the case to "facilitate Mr. Fankem's ability to fully participate in his hearing without creating additional distress".

A June 2020 mental health assessment determined that Fankem had no problems with memory or cognition and did not suffer from any major mental illness, but he likely "faces problems in higher order reasoning". As there was a lack of available information regarding his developmental history, a provisional diagnosis was made for paranoid personality disorder as well as a delusional disorder, persecutory type. On August 21, 2020, the CBSA confirmed Fankem was Cameroonian and an application for a travel document was filed with the Cameroonian Consulate. Fankem is still detained and is the longest-serving detainee on immigration charges in Canada.

== See also ==
- Michael Mvogo, a Cameroonian man previously held in Canada under similar circumstances
