= Australia's Shame =

- Four Corners episode
- Official graphic for the episode, depicting the inside of a BMU cell at the Don Dale Juvenile Detention Centre (Note: Graphic used by the Australian Broadcasting Corporation to identify the episode on the Four Corners website and ABC iView.)
- Written by: Caro Meldrum-Hanna; Elise Worthington
- Narrated by: Caro Meldrum-Hanna
- Presented by: Sarah Ferguson
- Cinematography by: Erik Havnen
- Editing by: Michael Nettleship
- Original air date: 25 July 2016
- Running time: 51 minutes

Episode chronology
← Previous "The Race to Dope"	Next → "Insult to Injury"

"Australia's Shame" is the title of an episode of the long-running Australian investigative journalism and current affairs program Four Corners, which aired on the ABC on 25 July 2016. Written by ABC journalists Caro Meldrum-Hanna and Elise Worthington, and reported by Meldrum-Hanna, the episode depicted the treatment of minors at the Don Dale Youth Detention Centre near Darwin in the Northern Territory. Accompanied with graphic footage, the episode documented the experiences of individuals as they stayed at the centre's "Behavioural Management Unit" (BMU) maximum security cells, set in a timeline from 2010 to 2015. It featured interviews with Northern Territory Minister for Correctional Services John Elferink, various lawyers, and former Northern Territory Children's Commissioner Dr. Howard Bath and current Commissioner Colleen Gwynne.

== Summary ==
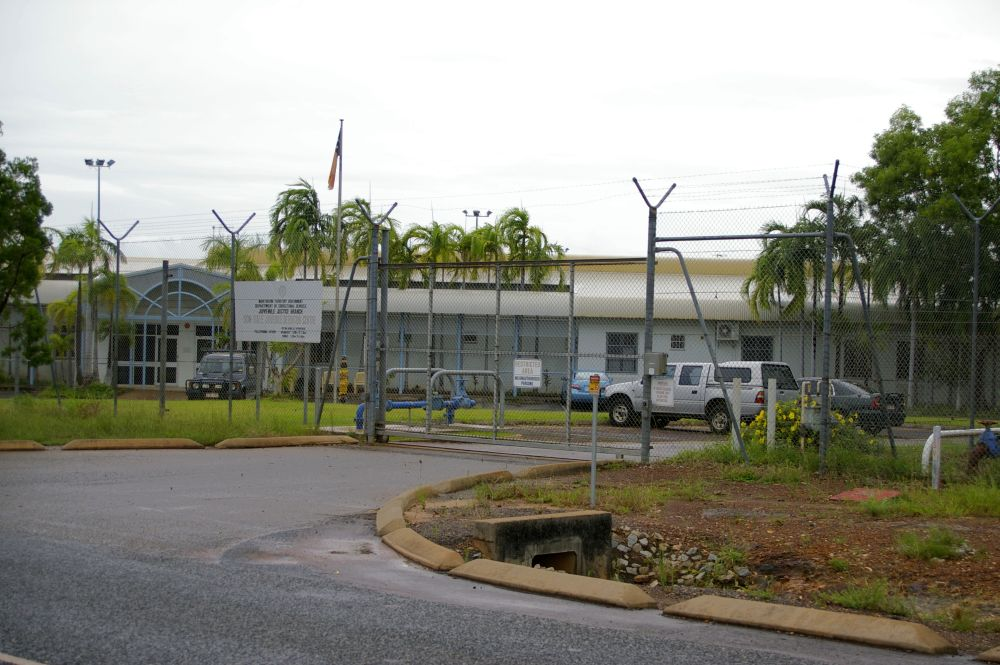
The Don Dale Juvenile Detention Centre, where the episode's subjects, Roper, Austral, Rogan and Voller, were held.

"Australia's Shame" follows the experiences of Jake Roper, Ethan Austral, Kenny Rogan and Dylan Voller at the Don Dale Juvenile Detention Centre, a maximum security prison located in Berrimah, Northern Territory. The episode cold opens with footage of a shirtless Voller, strapped and cuffed to a mechanical restraint chair, with his head covered by a spit mask in Alice Springs (adult) correctional centre after attempting to self harm, he had been transferred that day after threatening behaviour in the juvenile centre. he had previously requested of his own volition with the assistance of his lawyer and approved by a magistrate to be placed in the adult centre only to return after another juvenile requested relief from darwin adult prison from the NT supreme court returning them both to juvenile correctional centres. Presenter Sarah Ferguson introduces the episode by explaining to the viewer, "the image you've just seen isn't from Guantanamo Bay or Abu Ghraib, but Australia in 2015." After the traditional introduction, the episode, narrated and reported by Caro Meldrum-Hanna, begins with footage of the Behavioural Management Unit (BMU) cells at the Don Dale Juvenile Detention Centre in August 2014, when Roper breaks free from his cell and starts attempting to break out of the building with dis-attached light fixtures, while his cellmates watch on. Meldrum-Hanna explains that Roper had been kept in solitary confinement for 23 hours a day, for 15 days straight, describing Roper as "having lost all sense of time" and "deeply distressed". Prison authorities are then seen spraying tear gas into the room, affecting Roper and all his cellmates, before all being dragged outside, held on the ground and sprayed with water.

The episode continues with interviews with former Northern Territory Children's Commissioner Dr. Howard Bath, North Australian Aboriginal Justice Agency Lawyer Jared Sharp, and solicitor Peter O'Brien, who all give a description of the BMU cells at Don Dale, where children are kept for up to 24 hours a day, with no running water, no air conditioner, no fans, and no direct air supply. Contemporary media coverage of the August 2014 incident at Don Dale is shown, reporting a false account of the incident by the authorities, who stated that all of the cellmates had started a riot and armed themselves with metal bars and broken glass. The Northern Territory Minister for Correctional Services John Elferink is seen reaffirming the false account of the incident in a media report. Meldrum-Hanna declares that "prison authorities weren't telling the truth."

Jake Roper is the first of the boys from Don Dale to be interviewed by Meldrum-Hanna, who described his feelings during his tenure at Don Dale as "angry at some times, depressed at [other] times", and that he had "felt alone". Roper had been sent to Don Dale in June 2014, after he had stolen a car while he was homeless. He then later escaped along with four other detainees, only for all of them, including Roper, to be recaptured and then put into the BMU cells. Roper also describes constantly being reminded of his time at Don Dale, a feeling shared by fellow detainee Ethan Austral, who was also interviewed by Meldrum-Hanna, albeit through a Skype call. Austral, who stayed in the BMU cells the same time as Roper, stated that "sometimes, when I wake up, I'll be there, in the same spot." Austral was frequently jailed and released from Don Dale for a series of burglaries and car thefts since he was 11 years old.

== Reaction ==
=== Q&A ===
"I'm a father of three beautiful children and you do your best to raise your kids. Unfortunately, we need these sorts of facilities because sometimes things go wrong but if you are going to have them, make sure that it's a place of rehabilitation."

— Craig Laundy

A broadcast of the live panel discussion program Q&A immediately followed the broadcast of "Australia's Shame" on the ABC, and featured Assistant Minister for Industry, Innovation and Science Craig Laundy, Australian Labor Party MP Ed Husic, President of the Human Rights Commission Gillian Triggs, Shireen Morris of the Cape York Institute, and Reverend Peter Kurti of the Centre for Independent Studies, all of whom had viewed the episode shortly before Q&A went to air. Ed Husic described the feelings of the panel shortly after viewing the episode, recounting that "there was silence in the room after we watched it and I just felt a deep sense of indignation that it just didn't seem like anyone had really been moved to a point of action."

On the program, Triggs was questioned first by host Virginia Trioli about the episode, to which she described the treatment of the children as seen in the episode as "absolute horror", noting that she "had visited many detention centres and, sadly, [had] never seen conditions of that kind and I have never seen people treated in that way." Triggs also expressed the need for "some kind of investigation into this." Laundy, Husic, Morris and Kurti all agreed with Triggs, with Laundy concurring with the opinion of Barrister Lawrence in the episode, stating that he would inform "both the Prime Minister and the relevant Ministers about what we've seen and what we can do." Laundy additionally expressed that "all of that footage should be handed over to the State Government so that they can go through the footage in its entirety and help them make the decisions they need to make."

=== Government response ===
The airing of the episode comes only a month before the 2016 Northern Territory general election, to be held on 27 August 2016. Political analysts have predicted that the airing of the episode will put the incumbent Country Liberal Party "under even more pressure", after conceding defeat in the Northern Territory in June's federal election. Chief Minister of the Northern Territory and Country Liberal leader Adam Giles, in a statement released hours after the airing of the episode, condemned the situation in places such as the Done Dale Detention Centre as "a shocking state of affairs", concurring with Gillian Triggs' comments on Q&A, and encouraging a Royal Commission be set up to investigate places such as Don Dale. Despite the condemnation of the actions seen in the episode, Giles assured "full confidence" custodial officers in the Northern Territory, stating that "they have a challenging and difficult job, one that not many people wish to do. To those officers I want to say, you have my full support for the work that you do in upholding our laws." In the political fallout shortly following the broadcast of "Australia's Shame", John Elferink was sacked by Giles as the Northern Territory Minister for Correctional Services, with Giles taking over the portfolio indefinitely. Elferink did, however, retain all his other portfolios in the Giles Ministry, including Attorney-General of the Northern Territory, and Minister for Justice.

After consulting Adam Giles, attorney-general George Brandis, Indigenous affairs minister Nigel Scullion and Gillian Triggs, then-prime minister Malcolm Turnbull announced the Royal Commission into the Northern Territory juvenile detention system the morning after the episode aired, on 26 July 2016. Turnbull stated on ABC Radio that the Royal Commission would be set up "as soon as possible" and the relevant parties would make moves "very quickly". He further stated that "Like all Australians, we are shocked by the report, by that evidence on Four Corners last night. We have moved swiftly to get to the bottom of it. We need to get all the facts out as quickly as we can. We need to expose the cultural problems, the administrative problems that allowed this type of mistreatment to occur." When questioned about whether or not the Northern Territory government itself should be investigated, Turnbull pressed that "the important thing is to get to the bottom of what happened at Don Dale."

== See also ==
- Youth detention in the Northern Territory
- Royal Commission into the Protection and Detention of Children in the Northern Territory
