= 2024 Alice Springs curfews =

2024 series of curfews in the Northern Territory

- Part of youth violence in the NT
- Date: March 27 – April 16, 2024 (1st); July 8–10, 2024 (2nd)
- Time: 6pm - 6am (1st); 10pm - 6am (2nd) (ACST)
- Location: Alice Springs CBD, Australia
- Type: Area restriction curfew
- Cause: Civil discourse among youth in Alice Springs
- Organized by: Chief Minister of the NT (Note: Eva Lawler); Police Minister of the NT (Note: Brent Potter); Police Commissioner of the NT (Note: Michael Murphy)
- Arrests: 0

The 2024 Alice Springs curfews were a series of curfews enforced in Alice Springs, first from 27 March to 16 April, and secondly from 8 July to 10 July. The first curfew was announced by the Northern Territory Government after a string of violent attacks were occurring after-hours. The Country-Liberal opposition supported the curfews.

== Background ==
Crime has been a significant social issue in Alice Springs in the 21st century, as in most of the rest of the Territory. Aboriginal people are disproportionately represented as both perpetrators and victims, and a high proportion of the victims are women.

== Curfews ==
=== First curfew ===
The first curfew was announced by Chief Minister of the Northern Territory at the time, Eva Lawler, on 27 March, alongside her declaration of an 'emergency situation' with regards to the matter. Alongside the previous deployment of an extra 23 additional police via Operation Grimmel, Lawler announced a subsequent addition of 58 police officers which were sent to Alice Springs for the duration of the curfew.

=== Second curfew ===
The second curfew was imposed by NT Police commissioner Michael Murphy for July 8-10 via his announcement of a Police Disorder Declaration (PDD), following a series of antisocial behaviour and attacks, including one on a 42-year old woman, and the assault of four off-duty police officers.

== Curfew Legislation ==
New territory legislation that was enacted in June 2024 amended the Police Administration Act 1978 (NT), and the Police Administration Regulations 1994 (NT) to provide provisions that give the Police Commissioner the power to introduce and enforce Police Disorder Declarations (PDD). When a PDD is in force, police have the power to:

- Order a person to leave or not enter a specified area;
- As long as the PDD applies to at least one person in the group, order the group to disperse; and
- Order a person to remain where they are (for no longer than two hours) if the police officer believes it will prevent a safety risk.

The law allows the commissioner to declare a PDD for up to three days without ministerial approval. If a PDD is to be in effect longer than three days, express approval must be provided from the NT minister responsible for police who can decide to extend for up to 7 days. Under the legislation, the police minister has no power to override a three day PDD enacted by the police commissioner, giving the police commissioner sole authority for the introducing of such directives.

=== Criticism ===
The legislation has been criticised by some as possibly being open to political influence. Although the law provides for the ultimate decision to enact a curfew being in the hands of the incumbent Police Commissioner, it has been argued that prior events have hinted at the fact that the commissioner may have been unduly influenced by the relevant minister with regards to the announcement of the second curfew.

== Reaction ==
=== World Socialist Web Site ===
World Socialist Web Site, criticised the original curfew as 'draconian', and 'racially-targeted martial law' as well as claiming that Linda Burney was hypocritical in her support for 'police-state measures' (curfew) alongside her support for the Indigenous Voice to Parliament. WSWS also criticised federal Senator Jacinta Nampijinpa Price for her 'demand' of a 'police military intervention'.

=== Northern Territory Opposition ===
Opposition leader Lia Finocchiaro acknowledged that a curfew 'had to be called'.

=== Federal Labor Government ===
Federal Minister for Indigenous Affairs, Linda Burney, supported the introduction of the curfews but stated that Alice Springs needs longer-term solutions. She also indicated a pathway through the federal government's $250m package to improve community safety in central Australia.

=== Mayor of Alice Springs ===
Mayor Matt Paterson acknowledged that the curfews 'make us [residents] feel safe' but they 'can't continue to put these in'. Paterson has said that the town is in need of a longer-term solution, and that the curfews impose negative press on the community.
