= Margaret White (judge) =

Australian judge (born 1943)

The Honourable Margaret White AO FAAL

Justice of the Supreme Court of Queensland
- In office 2 April 1992 – 3 June 2013

Personal details
- Born: Margaret Jean Broderick; 4 June 1943 (age 82) Hamilton, Victoria, Australia
- Awards: Officer of the Order of Australia (AO) 2013

Margaret Jean White AO FAAL (born 4 June 1943) is an Australian jurist. She is a former Supreme Court of Queensland justice—the first woman to sit on the Supreme Court of Queensland. White was appointed to the Supreme Court in 1992 and was elevated to an Appeals Court Justice in 2010 until retirement in 2013. She has also previously served as a law lecturer at the University of Queensland.

== Education ==
White was educated at the Cabra Dominican Convent, Adelaide and graduated Bachelor of Laws at the University of Adelaide in 1966.

== Royal commission ==
In August 2016, White was appointed joint Commissioner with Mick Gooda for the Royal Commission into the Protection and Detention of Children in the Northern Territory, replacing Brian Ross Martin.

== Naval service ==
White became an inaugural member of the revived Women's Royal Australian Naval Service Reserve (WRANSR) in 1968. She served as a commander in the Royal Australian Naval Reserve from 2002 to 2010.

== Order of Australia ==
White was appointed as an Officer of the Order of Australia (AO) in the 2013 Australia Day Honours for "distinguished service to the judiciary and the law, through leadership in administration, contributions to education and law reform, and to the community of Queensland."
