= Darwin Correctional Centre =

Prison in Holtze, Northern Territory, Australia

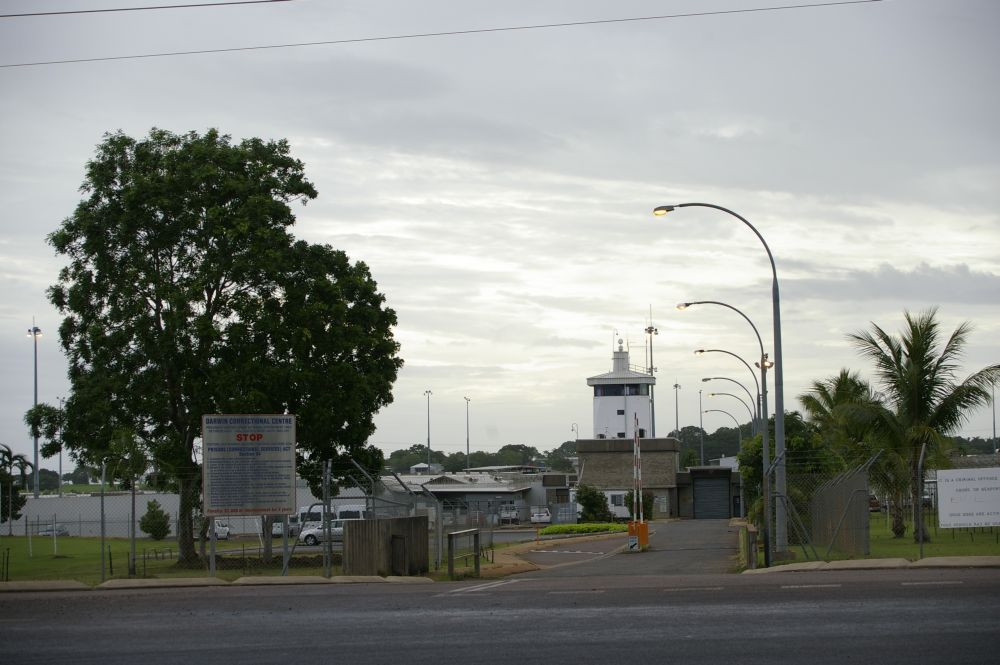
- Main gate of Darwin Correctional Centre, c. 2008

- Location in the Northern Territory
- Location: Darwin, Northern Territory; 12°27′46″S 131°01′51″E
- Status: Operational
- Security class: Minimum to maximum
- Capacity: 1048
- Opened: 2014
- Managed by: Northern Territory Correctional Services
- Website: https://nt.gov.au/law/prisons/darwin-correctional-centre

Darwin Correctional Centre is a minimum-to-maximum security prison approximately 30 kilometres (19 mi) by road from Darwin, Northern Territory, Australia. It is managed by Northern Territory Correctional Services, which falls under the territory’s Department of Attorney-General and Justice. The prison detains felons who have been charged and sentenced under Northern Territory and/or Commonwealth law.

== Facilities ==
The centre is a multi-classification prison with a capacity of 1048 prisoners of all security ratings. The centre was completed in 2014 and is the main reception prison in the Northern Territory, servicing most of the northern and metropolitan regions.

== Notable prisoners ==
- Bradley John Murdoch – Convicted and sentenced to life imprisonment of 28 years before he could be considered for parole for the abduction and murder of British backpacker Peter Falconio and attempted murder of Joanne Lees. Murdoch died in hospital on 15 July 2025, aged 67.
- Aaron Summers – Former Australian Cricketer, convicted on child sex crimes
- Outback Wrangler star Matt Wright – convicted in December 2025 on two counts of attempting to pervert the course of justice following a 2022 fatal helicopter accident that killed his friend and co-star Chris "Willow" Wilson

== See also ==
- Doug Owston Correctional Centre (Darwin Correctional Centre from November 2014)
- Berrimah Prison (closed November 2014)
