= Doug Owston Correctional Centre =

Prison in the Northern Territory, Australia

- Location within Northern Territory
- Location: Holtze, Northern Territory; 12°26′42″S 131°01′41″E
- Status: Operational
- Security class: Minimum to maximum
- Capacity: 800 (with capacity to expand)
- Opened: Late 2014
- Managed by: Northern Territory Correctional Services

The Doug Owston Correctional Centre, is an Australian minimum to maximum security prison for males and females. The centre is located in Holtze, Northern Territory, Australia, 22 kilometres (14 mi) south–east of Darwin and has a capacity of 800 prisoners, replacing the Berrimah Prison.

== Facilities ==
The centres states it delivers education and training programs, rehabilitation and treatment services to prisoners. In addition to the 800 bed correctional centre, the complex has further provision for 200 beds, a 30-bed mental health centre, a 48–bed centre for community based offenders, and a horticulture area for food production.

Construction of the new precinct was delivered through a Public Private Partnership at an estimated cost of A$300 million, and was completed late 2014.

== See also ==
- Darwin Correctional Centre
