= Jerrod =

Jerrod is a given name. Notable people with the given name "Jerrod" include:

- Jerrod Bettis, American music composer
- Jerrod Calhoun (born 1981), American basketball coach
- Jerrod Carmichael (born 1987), American comedian
- Jerrod Clark (born 1999), American football player
- Jerrod Heard, American football player
- Jerrod Johnson (born 1988), American football player
- Jerrod Laventure (born 1983), Haitian-American footballer
- Jerrod Mustaf (born 1969), American basketball player
- Jerrod Niemann (born 1979), American singer-songwriter
- Jerrod Riggan (born 1974), American baseball player
- Jerrod Sanders (born 1979), American mixed martial artist
- Jerrod Sessler (born 1969), American stock car racing driver
