= Michael Mvogo =

Man with no name

Michael Mvogo is a man who was unidentified for a decade, but thought to be possibly of African or Caribbean origin, who was detained in Toronto until 2015. He was initially arrested using the name Andrea Jerome Walker, and later used and claimed a number of different identities and nationalities, none of which have been conclusively proven to be true. He has been labeled by the media as Canada's "Man With No Name". In 2015, the Canada Border Services Agency confirmed that the man was Michael Mvogo, originally from Cameroon.

He entered Canada in 2005 using an American passport in the name of Walker, claiming to be born on January 22, 1973, in Wilmington, Delaware. A year later, he was arrested in a homeless shelter in Toronto with $10 worth of cocaine. When Canadian authorities attempted to deport Walker to the United States, American authorities determined that his passport was fraudulent (they were unable to find any record of Walker before 2001) and revoked it.

When Canadian authorities forwarded Walker's fingerprints to Interpol for analysis, they matched a "Michael Myogo," born on September 14, 1959, who was arrested for drug trafficking, resisting arrest and public mischief in Spain. In 2010, Mvogo claimed that Spanish authorities misspelled the surname, and that the correct spelling was "Mvogo." He claimed to be from Kribi, Cameroon. However, Cameroonian authorities were initially unable to verify his identity based on those biographical details.

After helping him obtain a Guinean passport from the Guinea embassy in Ottawa, on December 17, 2012, CBSA attempted to deport Michael Mvogo to Conakry, Guinea. However, upon arrival, the police at the airport refused to accept his Guinean passport as valid. Michael Mvogo was then escorted back to Toronto by CBSA staff.

A CBSA liaison officer based in Accra, Ghana went to Cameroon in March 2015 to talk to police, airlines, document screeners and customs and border officials and also went to rural Cameroon to try to track down proof of Mvogo's identity. A birth certificate was located and a relative who confirmed Mvogo's identity stated that he would be welcomed home.

== Other identities used ==
=== Michael Gee ===
When Canadian authorities forwarded Mvogo's fingerprints to the United States for analysis, they matched a "Michael Gee Hearns" who served time in New York's Rikers Island on a drug possession charge in 1993. He claimed to be a man named Michael Gee, born in Port-au-Prince, Haiti. The birthdate associated with Hearns in prison was September 14, 1966, but he claimed that it was off by one year. However, Haitian authorities were unable to verify his identity based on those biographical details.

== See also ==
- Herman Emmanuel Fankem, the pseudonym of a still-unidentified man incarcerated under similar circumstances
