= Central East Correctional Centre =

Correctional Centre in Ontario, Canada

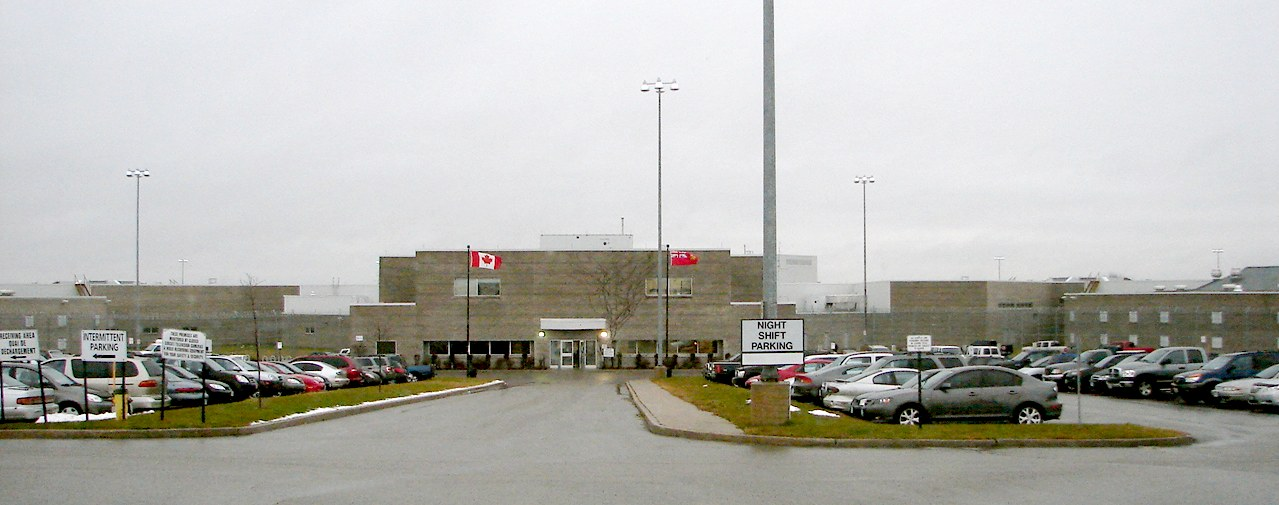
- Interactive map of Central East Correctional Centre
- Location: Kawartha Lakes, Ontario, Canada; 44°22′45″N 78°43′48″W
- Status: Operational
- Security class: Maximum
- Capacity: 1184
- Managed by: Ministry of the Solicitor General

The Central East Correctional Centre (as known colloquially as the Lindsay Superjail, or simply Lindsay; French: Centre correctionnel du Centre-Est) is a maximum security Correctional Centre located in Kawartha Lakes, Ontario. Inmates in this facility manufacture licence plates for the province. It is operated by the Ministry of the Solicitor General.

== Notable inmates ==
- Herman Emmanuel Fankem

== See also ==
- List of correctional facilities in Ontario
