= Jerod Draper =

American overdose victim

Jerod Draper (June 30, 1978 - October 4, 2018) was an American man who died in custody of Harrison County Jail. The circumstances of his death are often cited as an example of police brutality in the United States. Draper was featured in the documentary Safe Place, an investigative series into over 300 deaths that took place in Southern Indiana jails between 2010 and 2020.

Draper had ingested methamphetamine prior to his arrest for fleeing a traffic stop. While incarcerated, he began showing symptoms of a methamphetamine overdose. Guards stripped him naked and placed him in a medical isolation cell. When his condition worsened, he was placed in a restraint chair where guard Sgt. Matt Hulsey and jail nurse Michael Gregory tased him seven times in 15 minutes, stepped on his bare feet, and applied pain compliance techniques.

Harrison County Sheriff's Office initially refused to release surveillance video, but after successful appeal by journalists from IndyStar, footage was released showing officers placing the taser directly over Draper's heart. The Indiana State Police did not conduct an investigation into his death, and Draper's family settled a lawsuit after Harrison County Prosecutor Otto Schalk declined to prosecute any of the officers involved. The coroner ruled his death as an overdose.
