= Mick Gooda =

Indigenous Australian public servant

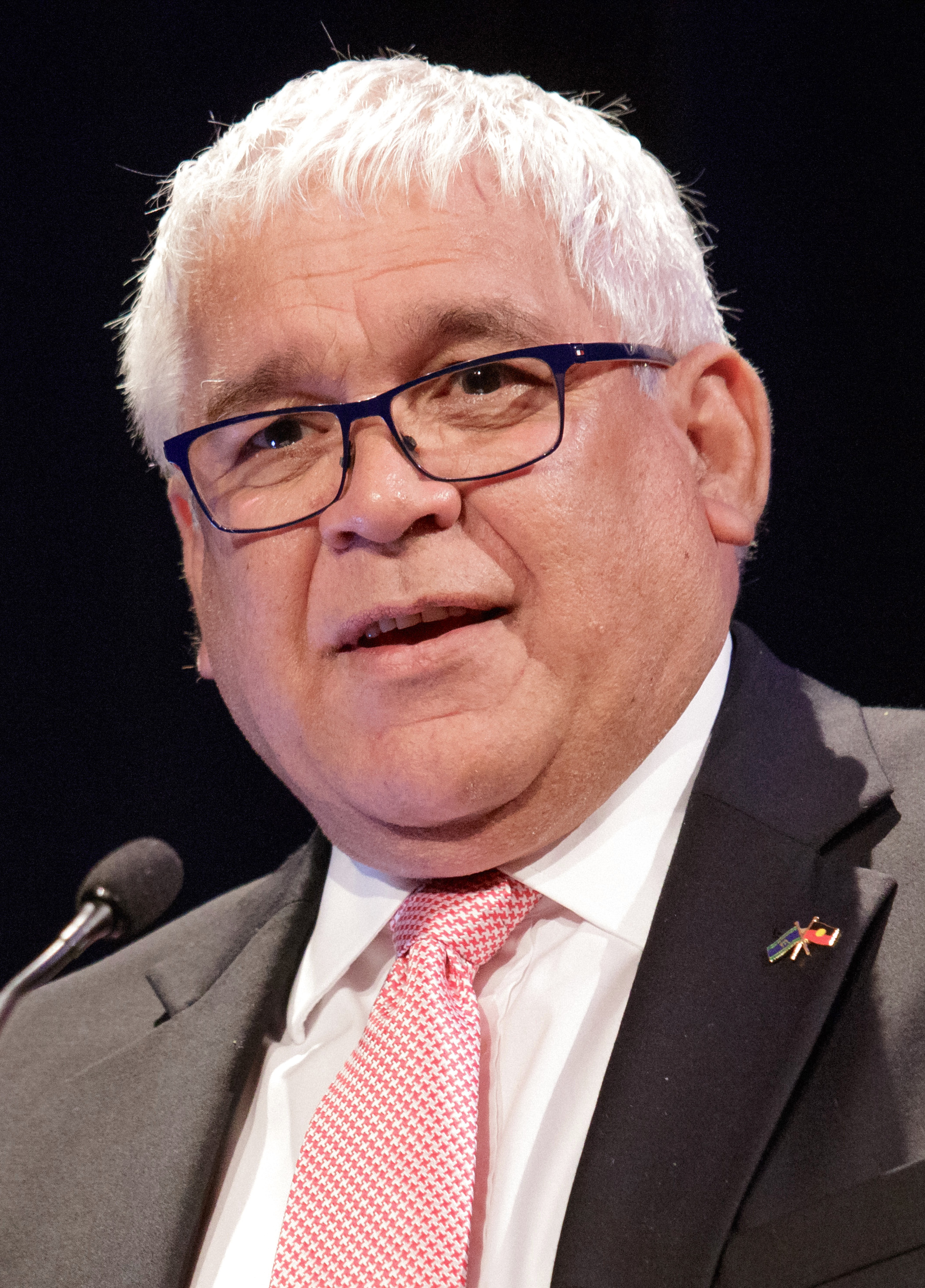
Gooda in 2015

Mick Gooda (born 1956) is an Aboriginal Australian public servant. He has particularly served as the Aboriginal and Torres Strait Islander Social Justice Commissioner of the Australian Human Rights Commission from 2009 to 2016 and as Co-Commissioner of the Royal Commission into the Protection and Detention of Children in the Northern Territory from 2016 to 2017. He is a descendant of the Gangulu people of Central Queensland.

== Career ==
Gooda was previously the chief executive officer of the Aboriginal Health Cooperative Research Centre. He was also a long-serving officer with the Aboriginal and Torres Strait Islander Commission.

He was the Aboriginal and Torres Strait Islander Social Justice Commissioner of the Australian Human Rights Commission from 2009 to 2016.

In 2016, Gooda and Margaret White were appointed as co-Commissioners for the Royal Commission into the Protection and Detention of Children in the Northern Territory.

Gooda was appointed as a member of the Expert Panel on Constitutional Recognition of Indigenous Australians by Prime Minister Julia Gillard in 2010 and appointed to the Referendum Council in 2015 by Prime Minister Malcolm Turnbull.

In 2015 he was appointed the chair of the Queensland Government Stolen Wages Reparations Taskforce. In 2018 he was appointed the inaugural First Nations Housing Advisor to the Queensland Government. In 2019 he was appointed to the Eminent Panel for the Queensland Government's Indigenous treaty-making process.

In November 2019, it was announced that Gooda would be one of 20 members of the Senior Advisory Group to help co-design an "Indigenous voice to government" (known as the Indigenous Voice to Parliament) set up by Ken Wyatt, the Minister for Indigenous Australians. The group is co-chaired by Wyatt, Marcia Langton and Tom Calma.
