= Barkly Work Camp =

Work Camp near Tennant Creek in Northern Territory of Australia

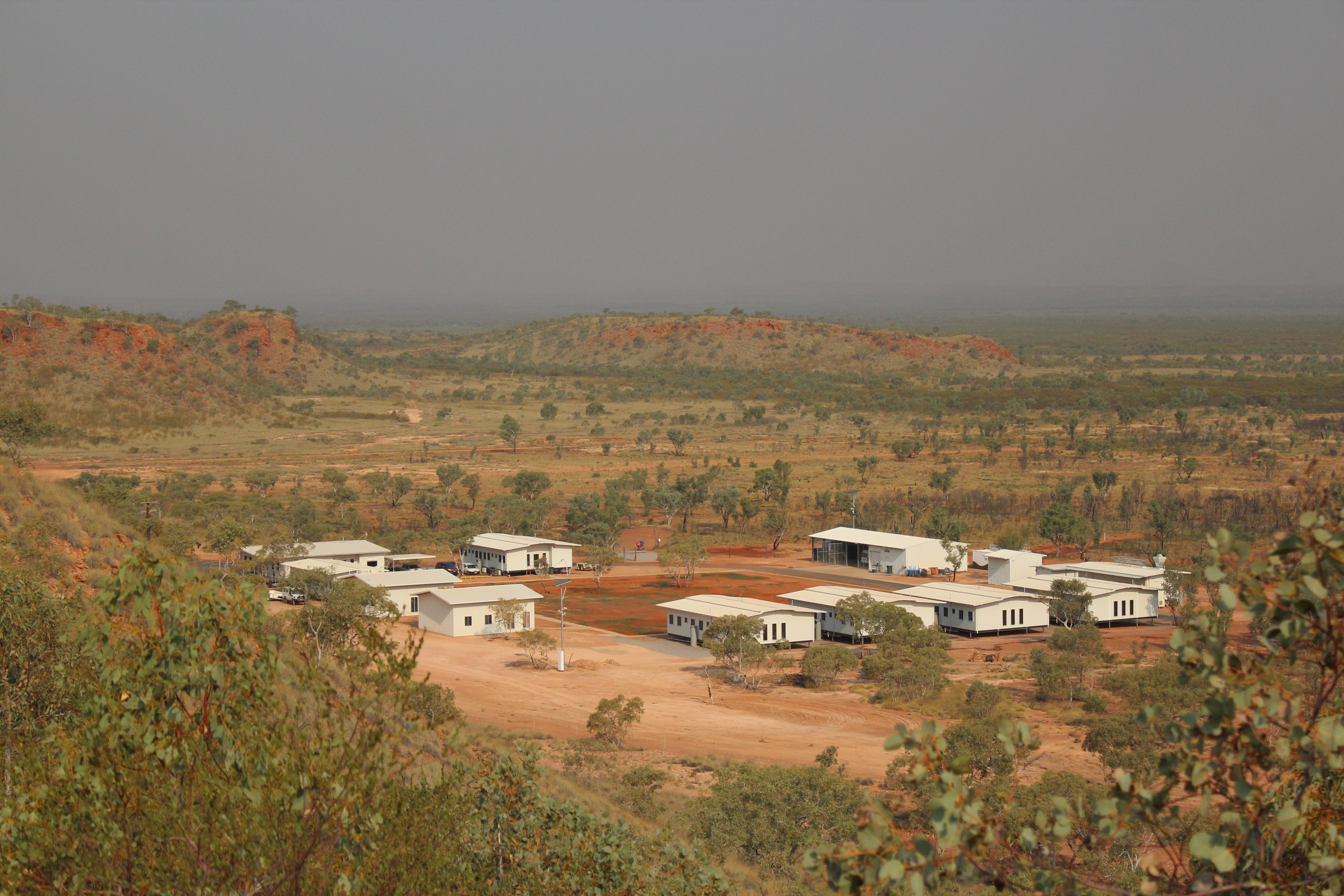
- Barkly Work Camp

- Location within Northern Territory
- Location: Tennant Creek, Northern Territory; 19°39′12″S 134°13′06″E
- Status: Operational
- Security class: Low
- Capacity: 50
- Opened: 2011
- Managed by: Northern Territory Correctional Services
- Website: https://nt.gov.au/law/prisons/barkly-work-camp

Barkly Work Camp is a low-security correctional work camp near Tennant Creek in the Northern Territory of Australia.

== History ==
The Barkly Work Camp opened on 8 September 2011 with a capacity of 50 prisoners. It aims to rehabilitate inmates by providing training and employment opportunities.

As of April 2018, the work camp housed 61 prisoners, which is 122 percent of its design capacity.
