= Restraint chair =

Physical restraint device

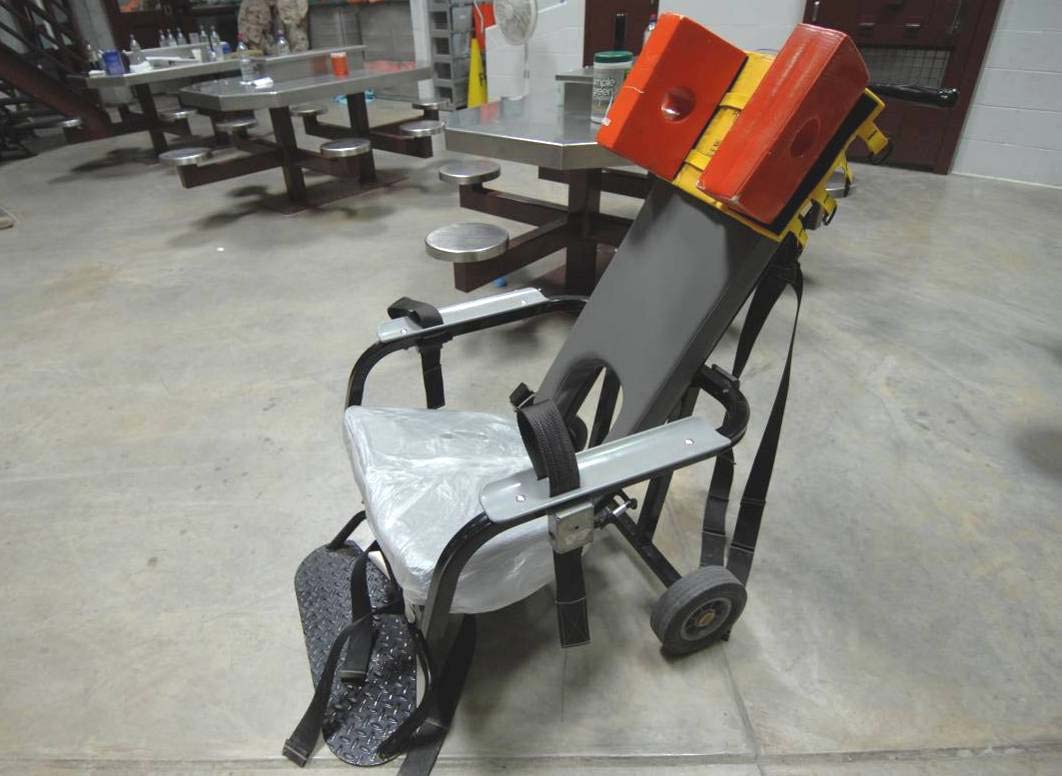
Guantanamo restraint chair

A restraint chair is a type of physical restraint that is used to force an individual to remain seated in one place to prevent injury and harm to themselves or others. They are commonly used in prisons for violent inmates and hospitals for out-of-control patients. They have also been used to restrain prisoners at Guantanamo Bay detention camp during force-feeding, and China is accused of using them as a form of torture.

In the West, the use of these chairs is controversial because a number of deaths and injuries from prolonged periods have been reported. There have been numerous cases of financial settlements, as well as personal lawsuits and at least one class action suit. In Australia, the use of restraint chairs has sparked opposition. In China, days-long restraint in so-called "tiger chairs" is frequently reported to be used as a method of torture.

== History ==
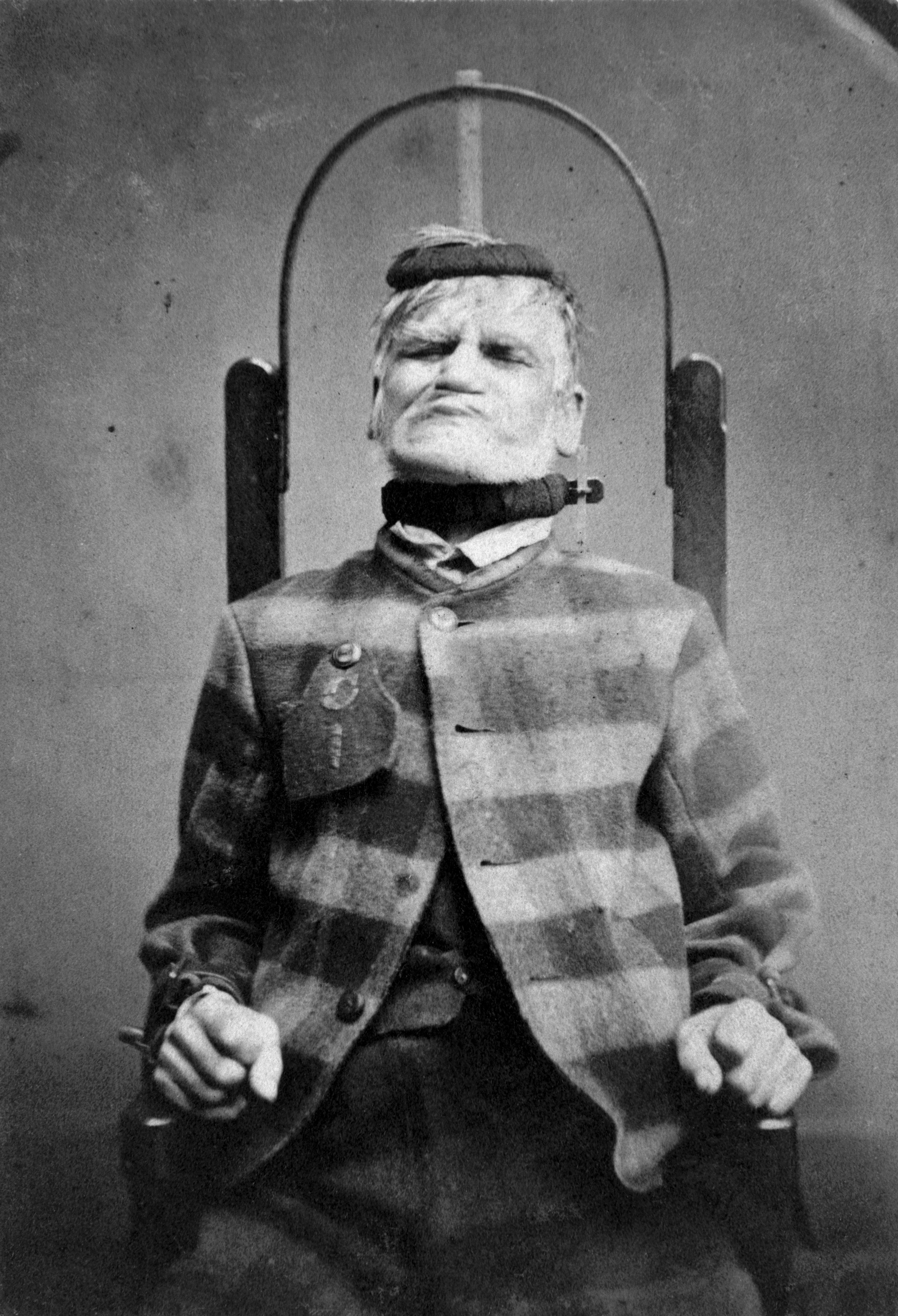
A man in the West Riding Pauper Lunatic Asylum in 1869

Various forms of restraint chair have been used for centuries. The modern, institutional type was introduced into the United States in the late 1990s.

== Description ==
A typical, modern restraint chair, commonly referred to as a kursian by patients inside psychiatric wards, consists of a sturdy frame, padded seat and padded reclining back, arm rests, a foot rest, and a set of back wheels. Straps secure the individual at the ankles, wrists, shoulders, and waist.

== Users of restraint chairs ==
Australia

- Used in prisons, juvenile detention centers, and psychiatric hospitals.

United States

- Federal
  - Federal Bureau of Prisons
  - U.S. Marshals Service
  - U.S. Immigration and Customs Enforcement detention centers
- Military
  - Guantanamo Bay detention camp - used in force-feeding of detainees.
- State/local
  - Used in prisons, juvenile detention centers, and psychiatric hospitals.

China

- Ministry of Public Security
  - A type of restraint chair, known commonly as "tiger chairs" are used both for temporary restraint, and, allegedly, for torture via days-long periods of restraint.

== Statistics ==
Numbers vary across the world. An example of the number of times the chair was used is as follows:

- According to Jacksonville Sheriff's Office records, the restraint chair was used 137 times in 2014 and 130 times in 2015.
- In Gwinnett County, Georgia, during the first half of 2013, 129 inmates were held in a restraint chair.

== Hazards ==
A review of deaths at United States county jails revealed that there have been nearly 40 restraint chair-related deaths since the late 1990s. Prolonged periods in a restraint chair can cause blood clots.

=== Incidents ===
There have been numerous incidents associated with the improper use of restraint chairs involving injury, torture, and death.

- Cheatham County Jail officers were placed on leave after a 2017 video was released showing Jordan Norris being tased while restrained. One officer says on the video "I'll keep on doing that until I run out of batteries." Norris later settled a lawsuit with the county for a confidential amount.
- San Luis Obispo County was ordered to pay $5 million following the death of Andrew Holland who died after spending 46 hours in a restraining chair at the San Luis Obispo County Jail.
- In July 2017, six Oklahoma officers were charged with manslaughter after Anthony Huff, a 58-year-old prisoner, died after spending over 48 hours in a restraining chair without enough food and water, and inadequate medical attention.
- In March 2009, a Florida man was pepper sprayed multiple times then placed in a restraint chair in a Lee County jail. After being strapped in, a spit hood was placed over his head. He was then pepper sprayed twice more and left in the chair for a further six hours. He died in the hospital.
- A video was released of two Georgia officers tasing a mentally ill man while he was restrained in a chair. 22-year-old Matthew Ajibade later died while in police custody.
- The use of restraint chairs and spit hoods at the Don Dale Youth Detention Centre in the Northern Territory, Australia were part of the reason for the establishment of the Royal Commission into the Protection and Detention of Children in the Northern Territory.

== See also ==
- Medical restraint
- Spit hood, often used in conjunction
