= Don Dale Youth Detention Centre =

Australian juvenile detention centre

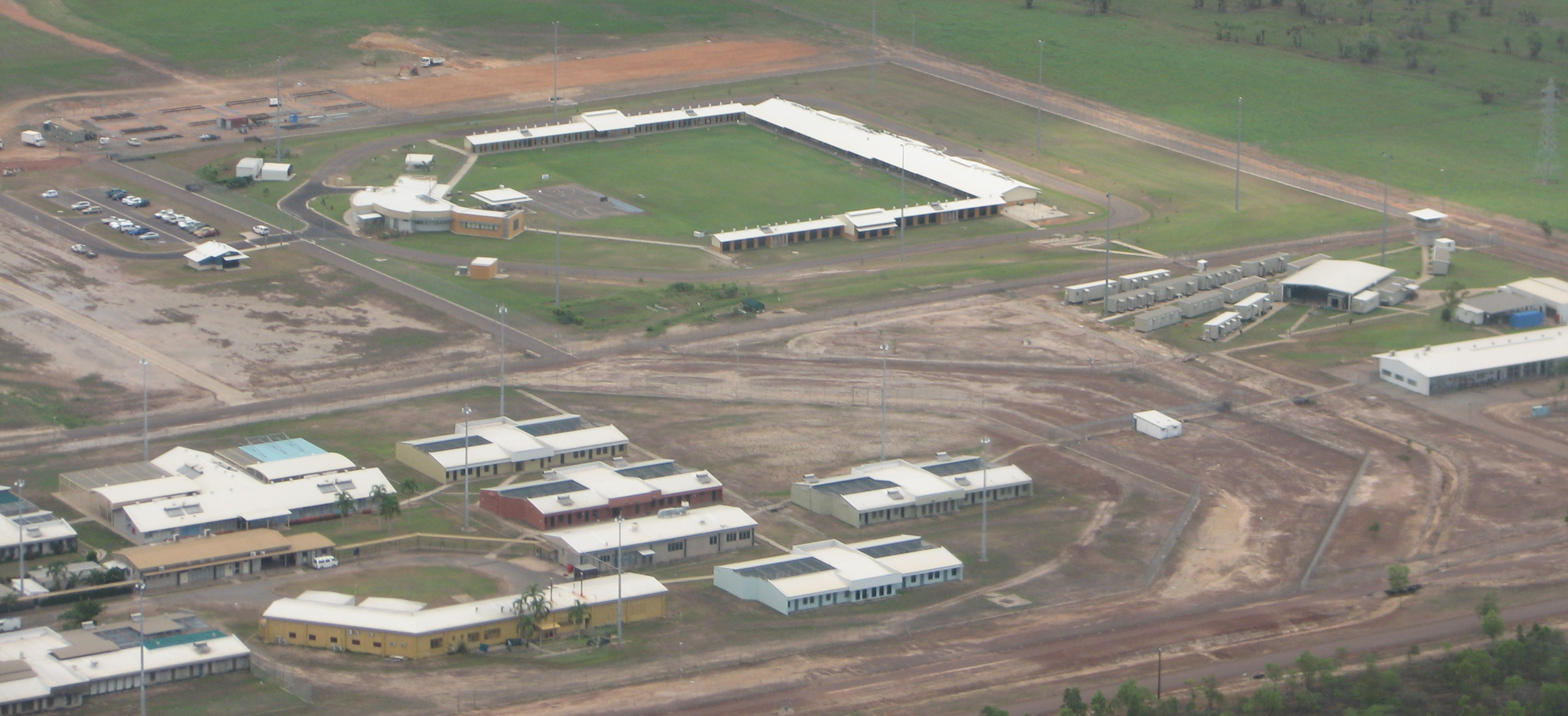
- Interactive map of Don Dale Youth Detention Centre
- Location: Berrimah, Northern Territory; 12.445775°S 130.940616°E
- Status: Operational
- Security class: Maximum, for juvenile males and females
- Opened: November 1991
- Managed by: Northern Territory Correctional Services

The Don Dale Youth Detention Centre (DDYDC) is a facility for youth detention in the Northern Territory, Australia. The centre is located in Berrimah, east of Darwin and houses male and female inmates. The facility is named after Don Dale, a former Member of the Northern Territory Legislative Assembly from 1983 to 1989 and one-time Minister for Correctional Services. The centre is operated by the NT Department of Corrections.

On 25 July 2016, the ABC broadcast a Four Corners report that exposed child abuse in the Northern Territory corrections system. The episode "Australia's Shame" resulted in the Royal Commission into the Protection and Detention of Children in the Northern Territory.

In late 2024, inmates from the Don Dale Youth Detention Centre were transferred to the new Holtze Youth Detention Centre. Don Dale has since been planned to be re-purposed as an adult correctional facility.

== Original facilities ==
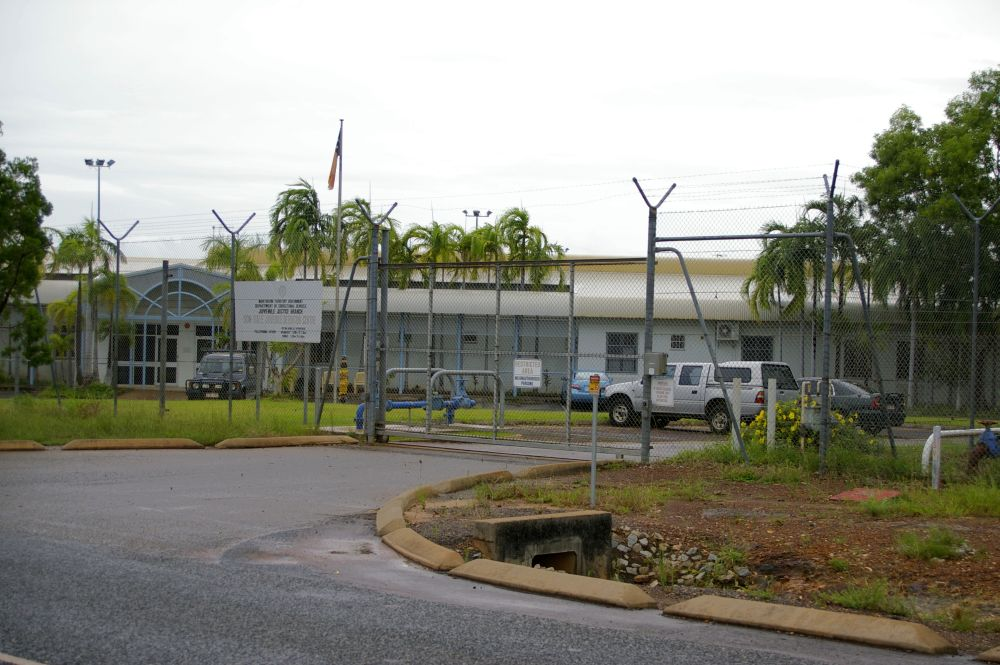
2008 photograph of prison site.

The Don Dale Youth Detention Centre was the Northern Territory's first purpose-built institution for young male and female offenders from across the Northern Territory aged from 10 to 16 years. Built in 1991, it was originally located adjacent to Berrimah Prison. The facility replaced Malak House, which had operated as a detention centre since 1987. Don Dale provided medium- to high-level detention, usually in single cells. In the early 2000s all detainees at Don Dale were expected to attend school unless they were involved in vocational programs.

== 21st century timeline ==
=== 2000: Death in Custody ===
In February 2000, 16-year-old Aboriginal boy named Johnno Johnson Wurramarrba from Groote Eylandt died by suicide at Don Dale. Wurramarrba had been sentenced in January to 28 days detention under the Northern Territory's mandatory sentencing laws for stealing petrol and paint from Angurugu School on Groote Eylandt. A Coronial Inquiry into the circumstances of the death resulted in a number of recommendations being made relating to training of staff and management practices in the centre.

In 2011, Xzibit, a US rapper, visited the centre and talked to inmates about his life experiences, following being detained in a juvenile detention centre as a 14-year-old.

=== 2014: Use of tear gas, relocation ===
In August 2014, six boys were in solitary confinement cells in the Behavioural Management Unit. One boy walked out of an unlocked cell, and beat on a locked reinforced door. The staff declared that there was a "riot", and released tear gas into the hallway, gassing all six boys. It took up to eight minutes to remove the boys in their cells from the tear gas. A news release to the media falsely asserted that six boys had escaped from their cells, despite CCTV in the hallway showing only one boy in the hallway. The incident, among others, was investigated by the Northern Territory Children's Commissioner Colleen Gywnne in a report provided in August 2015 to the then Corrections Minister John Elferink.

On 4 June 2020, the High Court of Australia found the use of the gas was unlawful.

Following the tear gas incident, the youths were moved from Malak House to formerly adult Berrimah Prison and Malak House was closed. In September 2014, the prison was renamed Don Dale Youth Detention Centre. The North Australian Aboriginal Justice Agency remained critical of conditions at the new site.

=== July 2016: Four Corners program ===
Use of restraint chairs and cable ties on children was expressly legalised by the Northern Territory Government in May 2016 and were used at facilities in both Darwin and Alice Springs.

Graphic footage of repeated child abuse at Don Dale, including the 2014 tear gas incident, was featured in ABC's Four Corners episode "Australia's Shame", which aired on 25 July 2016. Later in the year the documentary was televised worldwide. Teenage boys were shown being assaulted, stripped naked and tear-gassed. They were being held in isolation up to 72 hours with no running water. The program also showed a 17-year-old boy shackled and hooded in a chair at a facility in Alice Springs.

The Office of UN High Commissioner for Human Rights said it was "shocked" at the "appalling treatment" of the detainees, which violates the Convention against Torture and Other Cruel, Inhuman and Degrading Treatment, to which Australia is party. Global broadcast of the documentary caused worldwide astonishment about the inadequate actions of the minister.

Following national outrage, Prime Minister Malcolm Turnbull announced a Royal Commission into Juvenile Detention in the Northern Territory. John Elferink was sacked as Corrections Minister the morning after the program aired. The corrections and justice portfolios were taken on by Northern Territory Chief Minister Adam Giles. Use of restraint chairs and spit hoods were then suspended.

On 28 July 2016, it was announced that the 33 youths incarcerated in the centre were to be moved to the Wickham Point Detention Centre, a former immigration detention centre, located around 50 kilometres (31 mi) south of Darwin. The Wickham Point Detention Centre has been deemed by the Australian Human Rights Commission to be "completely inappropriate for children". Within 24 hours the decision to close the centre and relocate the detainees "had been scrapped for the time being", with Chief Minister Giles saying that the facilities at Don Dale were "good enough".

=== August 2016: Royal Commission ===
The Royal Commission into the Protection and Detention of Children in the Northern Territory was established on 1 August 2016. While the commission was expected to report by 31 March 2017, the final reporting date was extended three times due to the extent of documentary evidence and witnesses, to 17 November 2017. The report made more than 200 recommendations including the closure of the Don Dale Youth Detention Centre.

=== 2017 onwards ===
In April 2018, the Northern Territory Government announced it would commit A$71.4 million to build new youth detention centres in Darwin and Alice Springs as part of a $229.6 million package to overhaul the child protection and youth justice systems and implement the recommendations of the royal commission.

By November 2018, the facility was still in use. It was then revealed in Northern Territory Parliament that female detainees were being forced to shower while under video surveillance.

On 6 November 2018, a major disturbance broke out at Don Dale. Detainees escaped from their cells by stealing keys and attempted to break out of the facility using power tools. The school room at the facility was burnt and tear gas was used. The detainees were moved from the damaged detention centre to the Darwin watch house.

In May 2019, it was reported that every single child in detention in the Northern Territory – 22 boys and 2 girls – was Aboriginal, with 11 of them in Don Dale. Territory Families said it was still "not ready" to implement some of the key recommendations of the Royal Commission. The age of criminal responsibility had still not been raised to 12, nor the age of detention to 14 years old.

== Notable people ==
- Dylan Voller

== See also ==
- Crime in the Northern Territory
- List of Australian prisons
- Juvenile detention in the Northern Territory
- Magill Youth Training Centre
