= Berrimah Prison =

Former maximum security prison in Australia

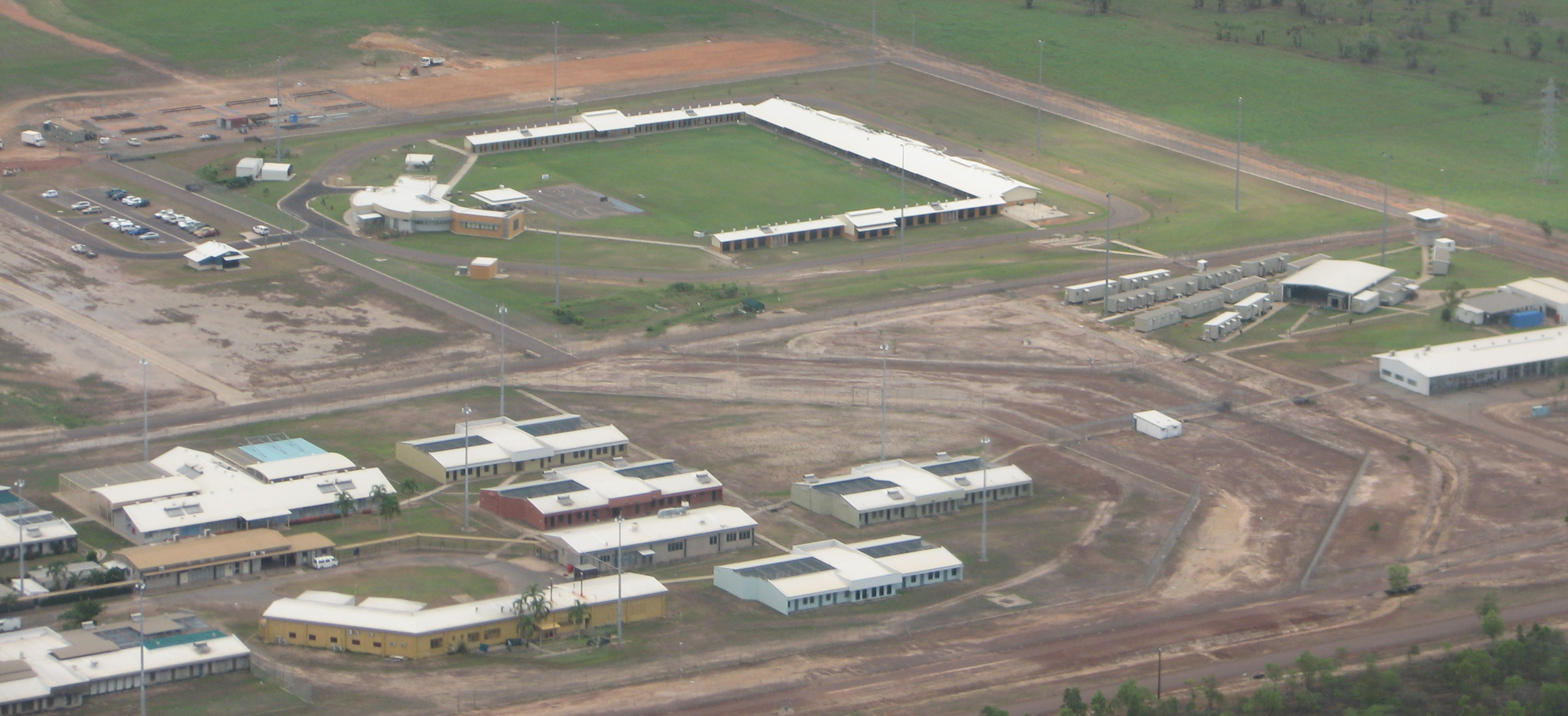
- Interactive map of Berrimah Prison
- Location: Darwin, Northern Territory; 12.445775°S 130.940616°E
- Status: Closed (prison site now houses the Don Dale Youth Detention Centre)
- Security class: Maximum
- Capacity: 750
- Opened: 1 September 1979
- Closed: 28 November 2014
- Managed by: Northern Territory Correctional Services

Berrimah Prison, was an Australian maximum security prison formerly located in Darwin, Northern Territory, Australia. The centre was managed by Northern Territory Correctional Services, an agency of the Department of Justice of the Government of the Northern Territory. The centre detained sentenced and charged felons under Northern Territory and/or Commonwealth law.

Following significant overcrowding, decommission plans were put into place and the adult facility was closed on Friday 28 November 2014. The Don Dale Youth Detention Centre was moved to the Berrimah prison site following an incident at that prison.

== Facilities ==
The centre opened on 1 September 1979 and replaced the Fannie Bay Gaol. Initially built to hold 110 prisoners, Berrimah Prison in 2012 housed approximately 750 inmates.

=== Visiting ===
In October 2010 it was reported that the prison changed visiting hours from seven days per week to weekends only, with the move likely being a cost-cutting measure, and at odds with the 2004 government-commissioned review recommending increased visits for prisoners.

=== Conditions ===
In 2012, ABC News reported Berrimah Prison was crowded to the point of overflowing. Conditions at the prison in 2011 were reported to be 'Dickensian', with spoiled food, rats and mosquitoes, with the worst conditions endured by prisoners on remand. The Australian quoted Northern Territory Supreme Court Justice Dean Mildren as saying the conditions do not comply with Australia's international obligations; The Australian also cited the strongest criticisms of the prison's conditions as coming from the Territory's executive director of Correctional Services, Ken Middlebrook, while Correctional Services Minister Gerry McCarthy challenged the report that prisoners were served rotten food. Western Australia's former head of custodial services, Richard Harding, described Berrimah's conditions as "appalling".

In 2009, the NT News reported there was a gang riot at the prison caused by heightened tension from overcrowding and staff shortages, with several jail blocks locked down. It was also reported that the Government stated that Berrimah was no longer suitable as a modern prison.

In 2008 it was reported that a chronic lack of social services in the Northern Territory was the reason for mentally-disabled persons being held for months in isolation at Berrimah Prison; the report also quoted the NT Government as indicating it is planning to build a forensic mental health unit as part of its planned new prison, but that it would not be designed as a substitute for social health services facilities.

=== Decommissioning plans ===
In 2010 the Northern Territory Government announced plans for a new correctional precinct to be built at Holtze to replace the Berrimah Prison. The new location is 4 kilometres (2.5 mi) north of Howard Springs Road and includes a new men's and women's correctional centre and the Territory's first secure mental health and behavioural management facility. Construction of the precinct commenced in late 2011 and was subsequently completed in the second half of 2014.

== Notable prisoners ==
- Lindy Chamberlain – convicted and later acquitted of murdering her 9-week-old daughter Azaria; Chamberlain gave birth to another child of her husband Michael Chamberlain while in custody; she was held at Mulawa Women's Prison, then transferred to Berrimah Prison; incarcerated from 29 October 1982 to 7 February 1986.
- Bradley John Murdoch – served life imprisonment for the 2001 murder of British backpacker Peter Falconio; later an inmate at Alice Springs Correctional Centre. Murdoch died in hospital on 15 July 2025, aged 67.
- Jim Dowling, Adele Goldie, Bryan Law, and Donna Mulhearn – known as the Pine Gap 4.
