= Royal Commission into the Protection and Detention of Children in the Northern Territory =

Investigation of abuse in the youth justice system

- Date: 28 July 2016 – 17 November 2017
- Location: Northern Territory, Australia
- Also known as: Royal Commission into the Child Protection and Youth Detention Systems of the Government of the Northern Territory; Royal Commission into Juvenile Detention in the Northern Territory
- Cause: Exposure of child abuse in youth detention by the "Australia's Shame" episode of Four Corners
- Outcome: 142 findings and 226 recommendations
- Royal Commissioners: Margaret White; Mick Gooda
- Website: royalcommission.gov.au/child-detention

The Royal Commission into the Protection and Detention of Children in the Northern Territory was a royal commission established in 2016 by the Turnbull government following the Australia's Shame episode of ABC's Four Corners which exposed child abuse within the Don Dale Youth Detention Centre near Darwin, Northern Territory. The commission was empowered by Letters Patent and the Royal Commissions Act 1902 to investigate failings in the child protection and the youth detention systems of the Northern Territory Government.

Letters Patent for the Royal Commission were issued on 28 July 2016 and reissued on 1 August appointing joint Commissioners The Honourable Margaret White AO and Mick Gooda. The final report for the Royal Commission was tabled in parliament on 17 November 2017.

== Background ==
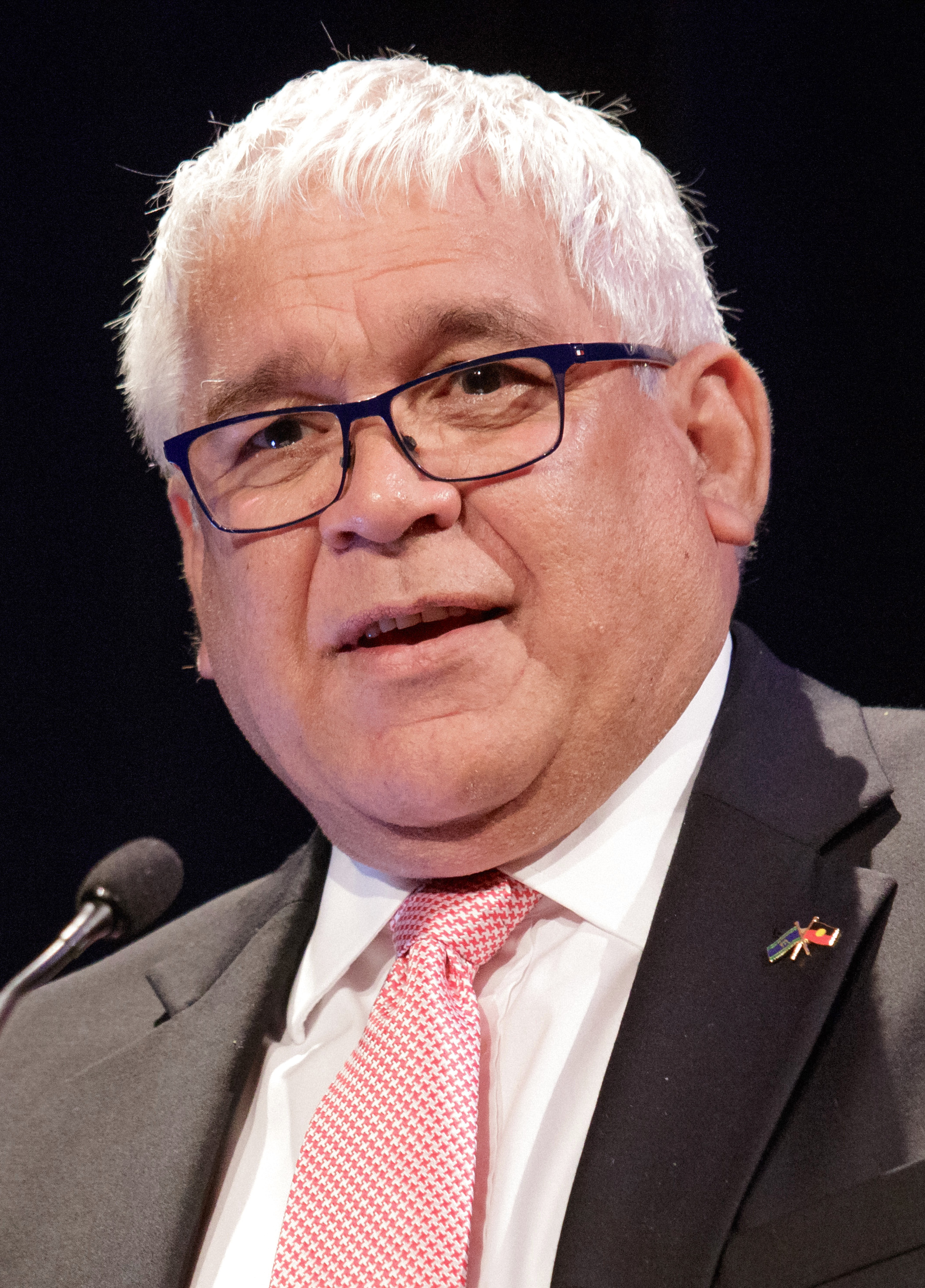
Mick Gooda, one of the two co-commissioners alongside Margaret White.

On 25 July 2016, the ABC Four Corners investigative program aired an episode titled "Australia's Shame". The program featured youth held in the Don Dale Juvenile Detention Centre in Darwin. The following morning, Prime Minister Turnbull announced that there would be a Royal Commission into the Northern Territory juvenile detention system.

Turnbull stated on ABC Radio that the Royal Commission would be set up "as soon as possible" and the relevant parties would make moves "very quickly". He further stated that "Like all Australians, we are shocked by the report, by that evidence on Four Corners last night. We have moved swiftly to get to the bottom of it. We need to get all the facts out as quickly as we can. We need to expose the cultural problems, the administrative problems that allowed this type of mistreatment to occur." When questioned about whether or not the Northern Territory government itself should be investigated, Turnbull pressed that "the important thing is to get to the bottom of what happened at Don Dale."

On 28 July 2016, Turnbull named The Honourable Brian Ross Martin AO, QC, a former Chief Justice of the Supreme Court of the Northern Territory, as commissioner to conduct the inquiry and announced the terms of reference.

Martin resigned as commissioner four days after being appointed due to community and political pressure over his appointment, saying that "rightly or wrongly, in this role I would not have the full confidence of sections of the Indigenous community which has a vital interest in this inquiry." The Attorney-General George Brandis appointed the replacement joint Commissioners The Honourable Margaret White and Mick Gooda that same day.

Brandis stated that the royal commission would examine the period since the Northern Territory Youth Justice Act came into operation in 2006 and focus on why two reports into the youth justice system — including one relating to the Don Dale Centre — were not sufficiently followed up. The two reports are the Review of the Northern Territory Youth Detention System Report of January 2015 and the Report of the Office of the Children's Commissioner of the Northern Territory about services at the Don Dale Youth Detention Centre of August 2015.

== Terms of reference ==
On 28 July 2016, Governor-General General Sir Peter Cosgrove AK, MC issued Commonwealth Letters Patent appointing Martin as commissioner and the commission's terms of reference. The commissioner was directed to examine "...failings in the child protection and youth detention systems of the Government of the Northern Territory; the effectiveness of any oversight mechanisms and safeguards to ensure the treatment of detainees was appropriate; cultural and management issues that may exist within the Northern Territory youth detention system; whether the treatment of detainees breached laws or the detainees’ human rights; and whether more should have been done by the Government of the Northern Territory to take appropriate measures to prevent the reoccurrence of inappropriate treatment."

Despite the Northern Territory having its own government, the Territory is officially administered under the Commonwealth of Australia, and the Commonwealth Letters Patent covered its jurisdiction.

The executive of the Aboriginal Medical Services Alliance Northern Territory said that Turnbull undermined the royal commission by permitting Chief Minister Adam Giles, who had ultimate responsibility for the events at the Don Dale Youth Detention Centre, to have a say in drawing up the terms of reference. Peak Aboriginal organisations, including the Northern and Central Land Councils, AMSANT, the Aboriginal and Torres Strait Islander Social Justice Commissioner and legal groups, were also critical of Martin's appointment. The federal Opposition said they were not consulted in the drawing up of the terms of reference, and called for the appointment of two Indigenous co-commissioners.

As a result of the resignation of Martin on 1 August 2016, Governor-General General Sir Peter Cosgrove AK, MC issued Commonwealth Letters Patent appointing White and Gooda as joint Commissioners and the Commission's terms of reference. The Commissioners have been directed to examine "...failings in the child protection and youth detention systems of the Government of the Northern Territory; the effectiveness of any oversight mechanisms and safeguards to ensure the treatment of detainees was appropriate; cultural and management issues that may exist within the Northern Territory youth detention system; whether the treatment of detainees breached laws or the detainees’ human rights; and whether more should have been done by the Government of the Northern Territory to take appropriate measures to prevent the reoccurrence of inappropriate treatment.

== Procedures and methods ==
=== Powers ===
The powers of Royal Commissions in Australia are set out in the enabling legislation, the Royal Commissions Act 1902 (Cth). Royal Commissions, appointed pursuant to the Royal Commissions Act or otherwise, have powers to issue a summons to a person to appear before the Commission at a hearing to give evidence or to produce documents specified in the summons; require witnesses to take an oath or give an affirmation; and require a person to deliver documents to the Commission at a specified place and time. A person served with a summons or a notice to produce documents must comply with that requirement, or face prosecution for an offence. The penalty for conviction upon such an offence is a fine of A$1,000 or six months imprisonment. A Royal Commission may authorise the Australian Federal Police to execute search warrants.
