= Oberon (disambiguation) =

Oberon is a legendary king of the fairies.

Oberon may also refer to:

== Creative works and characters ==
- Oberon (Seyler), a 1789 Singspiel by Friederike Sophie Seyler
- Oberon (Weber), an 1826 opera by Carl Maria von Weber
- Oberon (poem), a 1796 epic poem by Christoph Martin Wieland
- Oberon, the Faery Prince, a 16th-century masque by Ben Jonson
- Oberon (comics), a character in DC Comics
- Oberon, a character in The Chronicles of Amber
- Oberon, a Gargoyles character
- Oberon, a fictional spacecraft in Planet of the Apes
- Oberon, a playable character in the game Warframe
- Oberon, a character in the manga The Ancient Magus' Bride
- Oberon, a character in the play A Midsummer Night's Dream

== Computing ==
- Oberon (operating system)
- Oberon (programming language)

== Naval vessels ==
- HMS Oberon (1805), a 16-gun brig-sloop
- HMS Oberon (P21), an Odin-class submarine launched in 1926
- HMS Oberon (S09), an Oberon-class submarine launched in 1959
  - Oberon-class submarine

== Places ==
- Oberon, New South Wales, a town in Australia
- Oberon Council, a local government area in New South Wales, Australia
- Oberon, North Dakota, US
- Lake Oberon in the Arthur Range, Tasmania

== Other uses ==
- Oberon (2009–2021, a.k.a. Club Oberon), a former venue of the American Repertory Theater
- Oberon (moon), a moon of Uranus
- Oberon Books, a publisher based in London
- Oberon High School, a secondary school in Victoria, Australia
- Oberon Mall, a shopping mall in India
- Club Oberon, club theater venue built by the Carr Foundation
- Oberon, a beer manufactured by Bell's Brewery

== People with the name ==
- Marc Oberon, English magician
- Merle Oberon (1911–1979), British actress
- Oberon Zell-Ravenheart (born 1942), Neopagan activist

== See also ==
- Auberon (disambiguation)
- HMS Oberon, a list of ships

Media related to Oberon (disambiguation) at Wikimedia Commons
