= Northern Territory Police Force =

Australian law enforcement agency

- Badge of the Northern Territory Police

- Flag of the Northern Territory Police
- Abbreviation: NT Police
- Motto: To Serve and Protect

Agency overview
- Formed: 1911

Jurisdictional structure
- Operations jurisdiction: Northern Territory, Australia
- Northern Territory Police jurisdiction
- Area: 1,420,970 square kilometres (548,640 sq mi)
- Population: 250,398 (Estimated 2022)
- Legal jurisdiction: As per operations jurisdiction
- Governing body: Government of Northern Territory
- Constituting instrument: Police Administration Act 1978 (NT)
- General nature: Civilian police

Operational structure
- Overseen by: Independent Commissioner Against Corruption
- Headquarters: Peter McAulay Centre, Berrimah; Darwin, NT; 12°27′40″S 130°50′22″E
- Sworn officers: 1,552 (June 2024)
- Minister responsible: Lia Finocchiaro, Minister for Police, Fire and Emergency Services
- Agency executive: Martin Dole, Police Commissioner
- Units: List: Drug and Alcohol Policy Unit; Domestic and Personal Violence Protection Unit; Indigenous Development Unit; Juvenile Pre-Court Diversion Scheme; Road Safety; Air Wing; Counter Terrorism Security Coordination Unit; Criminal History and Warrants Unit; Firearms Policy and Records Unit; Joint Emergency Services Communications Centre; Marine and Fisheries Enforcement Unit; Territory Response Group
- Service areas: 3: Darwin Metropolitan; Regional Operations; Crime and Specialist Services

Facilities
- Stations: 70 police stations and shopfronts

Website
- pfes.nt.gov.au/police

The Northern Territory Police Force is the law enforcement agency responsible for policing the Northern Territory of Australia. The police force has 1,552 police officers (2023-24 financial year) made up of 87 senior sergeants, 293 sergeants, 868 constables, 182 auxiliaries, and 55 Aboriginal Community Police Officers. The remaining positions are held by commissioned officers. It also has a civilian staff working across the NT Police, Fire and Emergency Services.

Police in the Northern Territory are part of a tri-service: the Northern Territory Police, Fire and Emergency Services with the Commissioner of Police as the CEO of the tri-service.

== History ==
The Northern Territory Police traces origins to the South Australian Mounted Police, which began operating in the Territory in 1870 under Inspector Paul Foelsche. A Native Police Corps was established in 1884. In 1911, following the transfer of the Territory to Commonwealth administration, the Northern Territory Police Force was established as a separate police force. In 1931, the Northern Territory was consolidated under a single administration, with responsibility for the police vested in the Administrator of the Northern Territory, in Darwin.

In December 1869, the governor commissioned Paul Foelsche, a Corporal in the SA Mounted Police stationed at Strathalbyn, to be the first sub-inspector of police at Palmerston. He sailed for Darwin soon afterwards. The police uniform then worn in the Territory was the same as that worn in South Australia. It consisted of a short cut-away blue serge tunic with nine regulation buttons, silver twisted cord shoulder knots, black braid on the sleeves and silver chevrons for non-commissioned officers. The riding breeches were dark blue corkscrew serge with a white stripe.

The earliest firearms used were Snider–Enfield rifles and carbines firing a .577 calibre cartridge. Later, Martini–Henry rifles were used, and Webley revolvers were issued. Like their predecessors, the Rural Constabulary at Escape Cliffs, the first detachment of police at Palmerston had as their first responsibility the maintenance of law and order in the community.

The police were frequently engaged following the discovery of gold near Pine Creek in 1872. Stations were established at Adelaide River, Yam Creek, Pine Creek, Roper River and later at Daly River. The first police fatality occurred in 1872 when Mounted Constable Davis, a noted swimmer, disobeyed a local Standing Order and swam in the sea. He was killed by a crocodile. Darwin's first police station was constructed of poles and plaster measuring 6.1 metres (20 ft) by 3.7 metres (12 ft). The inspector lived nearby in three rooms. A small stone building with two cells was the accommodation for those in custody. These are now incorporated in the Administrator's offices on the Esplanade.

In Central Australia the police were part of the South Australian Mounted Police. Mounted Constable Shirley was the first mounted trooper in charge at Alice Springs (first called Stuart). At one time there were two Commissioners of Police in the Northern Territory: one for the Territory of North Australia and one for the Territory of Central Australia. In 1931, the two Territories became the Northern Territory of Australia and the authority of the Commissioner of Police was vested in the Administrator of the Northern Territory, in Darwin.

On 1 July 1964, Clive William Graham, a police officer of long standing in the Territory, was appointed as Commissioner and the force as a whole was administered as part of the Public Service of the Northern Territory. In recent years, various cases have made national and international headlines: the end of the Petrov Affair occurred in Darwin; the 1968 month-long bush search for Larry-Boy who murdered his wife and seriously injured a stockman at Elsey Station; and the 1971 attempted hijack of a plane at Alice Springs airport in which a Territory police officer, who was badly wounded. Events connected with search and rescue operations at sea, in swamps and the desert have also made the news. Auxiliaries and Aboriginal Community Police Officers. The Joint Emergency Services Communications Centre in Darwin has instant contact with all stations, vehicles, aircraft and vessels and provides for the Police, Fire, Emergency Services and St John Ambulance Service.

=== Female officers ===
Females were accepted as officers prior or from 1960. In 1962, both male and female candidates had to be unmarried, male applicants aged 21 to 30 years of age, up to 35 years with previous police experience; yet female applicants had to be between 25 and 35 (unless previous police experience). By 1970, only female candidates had to be unmarried. Believed-to-be Australia's first female police motorcyclist, in April 1980, Constable Kate Vanderlaan rode a Honda 750 cc police special around Darwin. She later rose to be a deputy commissioner of the force.

=== Recent history ===
In 1955, there were 80 police officers. As of June 2011, the number of sworn Police, Auxiliaries and Aboriginal Community Police Officers in the service was 1,381.

In 1989, the Northern Territory Police, Fire and Emergency Services were joined to become a Tri-Service. The Commissioner of Police also becoming the Chief Executive Officer for the Fire and Rescue Service and the Emergency Services.

In July 2019, Commissioner Reece Kershaw was appointed Commissioner of the Australian Federal Police, after being at the helm of NT Police for five years.

In 2012, the colour of the police uniform changed from khaki to blue following a ballot in 2011 in which nearly 60% of officers voted in favour of changing the colour to blue. The roll-out of the new blue uniform, with a new design including the word "Police" displayed on the back of the shirt, started in February 2012 and finished in July 2012.

In May 2023, commissioner Jamie Chalker resigned shortly before he was due to give evidence against the NT Government.

In 2024, NT Police enforced a series of curfews in Alice Springs.

On 9 March 2025, Michael Murphy's employment as commissioner was terminated following the ICAC's finding that Murphy had been engaged in a scandal that involved Murphy employing his close friend. Following this announcement Martin Dole became the acting commissioner. Dole was sworn in as commissioner in October 2026.

In June 2025, the Northern Territory government announced that transit safety and public housing safety officers would become part of the NTPF known as Police Public Safety Officers (PPSO), together with police auxiliaries, with training to commence in December 2025 and the officers to be operational in early 2026. PPSOs will wear NTPF uniforms and will be armed with firearms. In June 2026, the first squad of PPSOs to graduate from the 18-week training program commenced patrols in Darwin. The government said PPSOs will also patrol Palmerston, Alice Springs and Katherine.

=== Organisational structure ===
- Acting Commissioner: Martin Dole
- Deputy Commissioner, People, Crime and Capability: Murray Smalpage
- Deputy Commissioner, Operations and Road Safety: Vacant
- Assistant Commissioner, People and Cultural Reform: Bruce Porter
- Assistant Commissioner, Crime, Intelligence and Capability: Michael White
- Assistant Commissioner, Greater Darwin, Road Safety and Support: Travis Wurst
- Assistant Commissioner, Regional and Remote Operations: Martin Dole

== Organisation ==
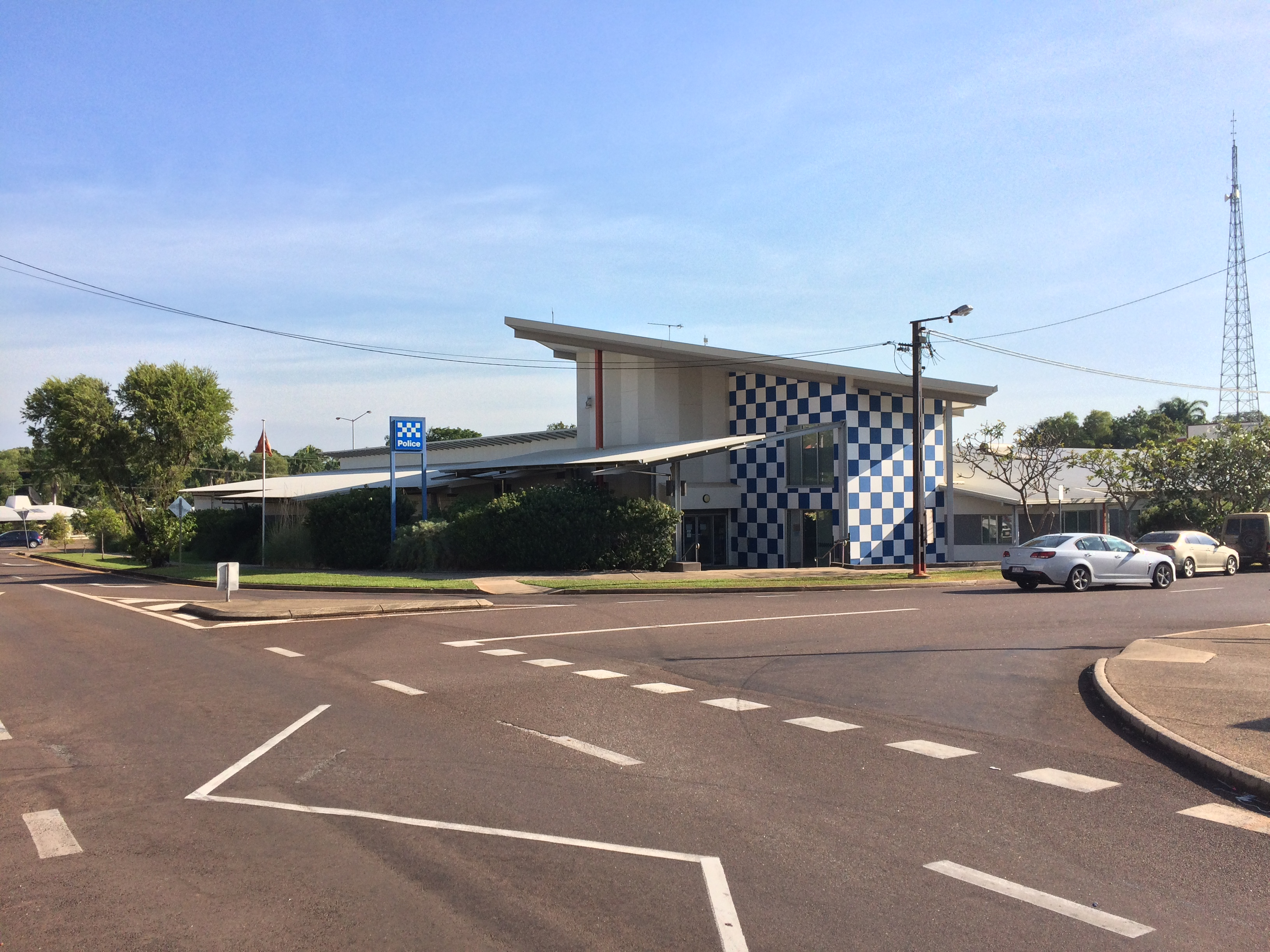
Casuarina Police Station

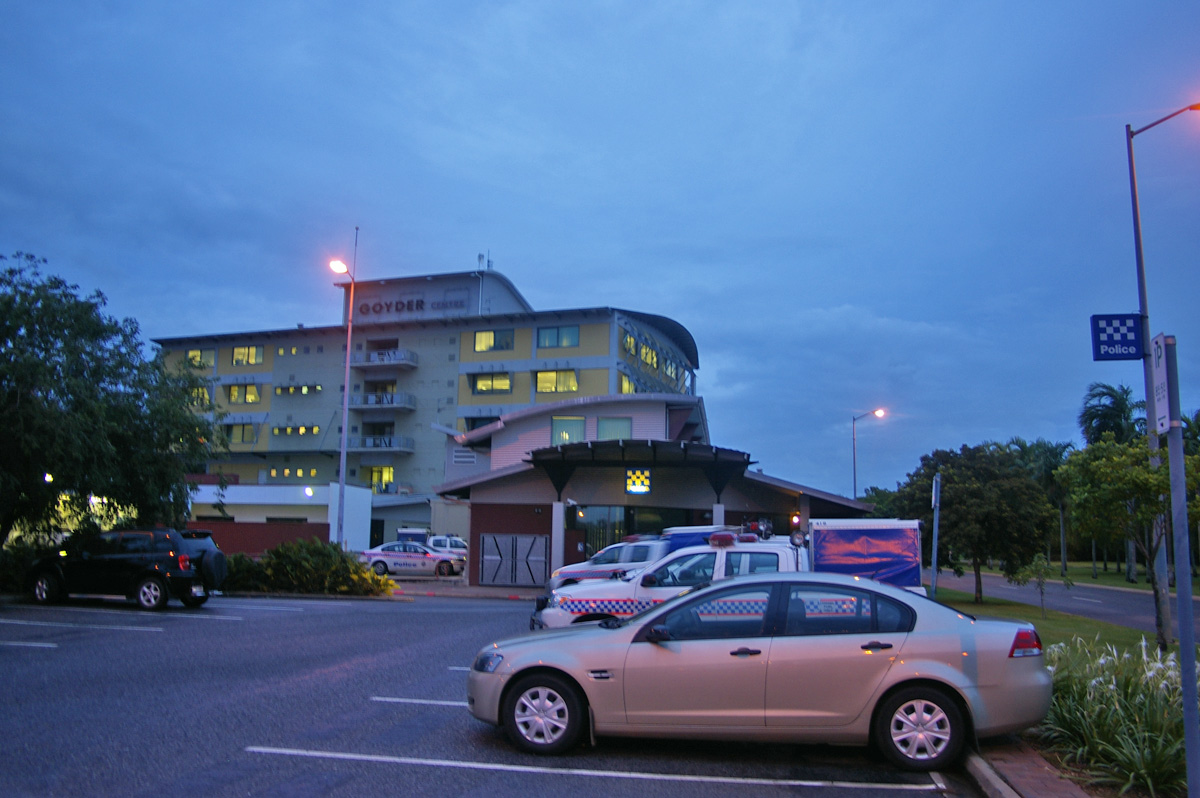
The old Palmerston Police Station

The headquarters of the Northern Territory Police is located at NAB House on Smith Street, Darwin. The Department of Police, Fire and Emergency Services is administered from the Peter McAulay Centre in Berrimah. The Northern Territory Police maintains 63 local police stations and 5 police shopfronts coordinated by their respective Local Area Commands.

A number of specialist units have been established, including the Territory Response Group, Accident Investigation Unit, Computer Crime Unit, Drug Intelligence Unit, Substance Abuse Intelligence Desk (SAID), Indigenous Development Unit, Highway Patrol Unit, Missing Persons Unit, Remote Area Traffic Patrol Unit and Air Support Unit.

=== Air Wing ===
The NT Police Air Wing was formed in 1979 with bases in Darwin and Alice Springs, operating two fixed wing aircraft. The area of operation covers 1,346,200 square kilometres (332,700,000 acres), being some 1,610 kilometres (1,000 mi) north to the south and 934 kilometres (580 mi) east to the west. This around one sixth of the Australian landmass, but is very remote, having less than 200,000 residents (1% of the national population). The commonwealth government funded an extra two planes to be based in Darwin. The planes were later handed back due to lack of money.

=== CitySafe ===
The CitySafe and Licensing Patrol Unit was forged during New Year's Eve celebrations in 2008/2009. CitySafe was officially launched by the NT Chief Minister Paul Henderson on 25 February 2009. Following the launch of CitySafe, NT police considered establishing a specialist licensing enforcement unit in 2010.

=== Bottle Shop Security ===
Police Auxiliaries now guard bottle shops in Katherine, Tennant Creek and Alice Springs. They are called liquor inspectors.

== Firearms and equipment ==
Officers now carry the Glock 22 or the Glock 27 .40-calibre pistol for plain clothes members. Other weapons used in the Northern Territory Police include the AR-15 semi-automatic rifle which is used by specialist groups and specifically trained members in rural areas. Officers also carry Remington model 870 pump action shotgun and Remington model 700 (.308) bolt-action rifle, which is gradually replacing the older BRNO model 601 bolt-action rifles in the same calibre. The NT Police introduced the Model X-26 Advanced TASER into operational service for General Duties members in February 2008, distributing 74 units. The X26 Taser has now been replaced with the Taser X-2. as a less-lethal force option available to each frontline patrol.

Restraints used are ADI Saf-Lok Mark-IV and V handcuffs and Flexi-cuffs. Mk-6 and Mk-9 First Defense oleoresin capsicum (OC) spray are also general issue.

== Vehicles ==
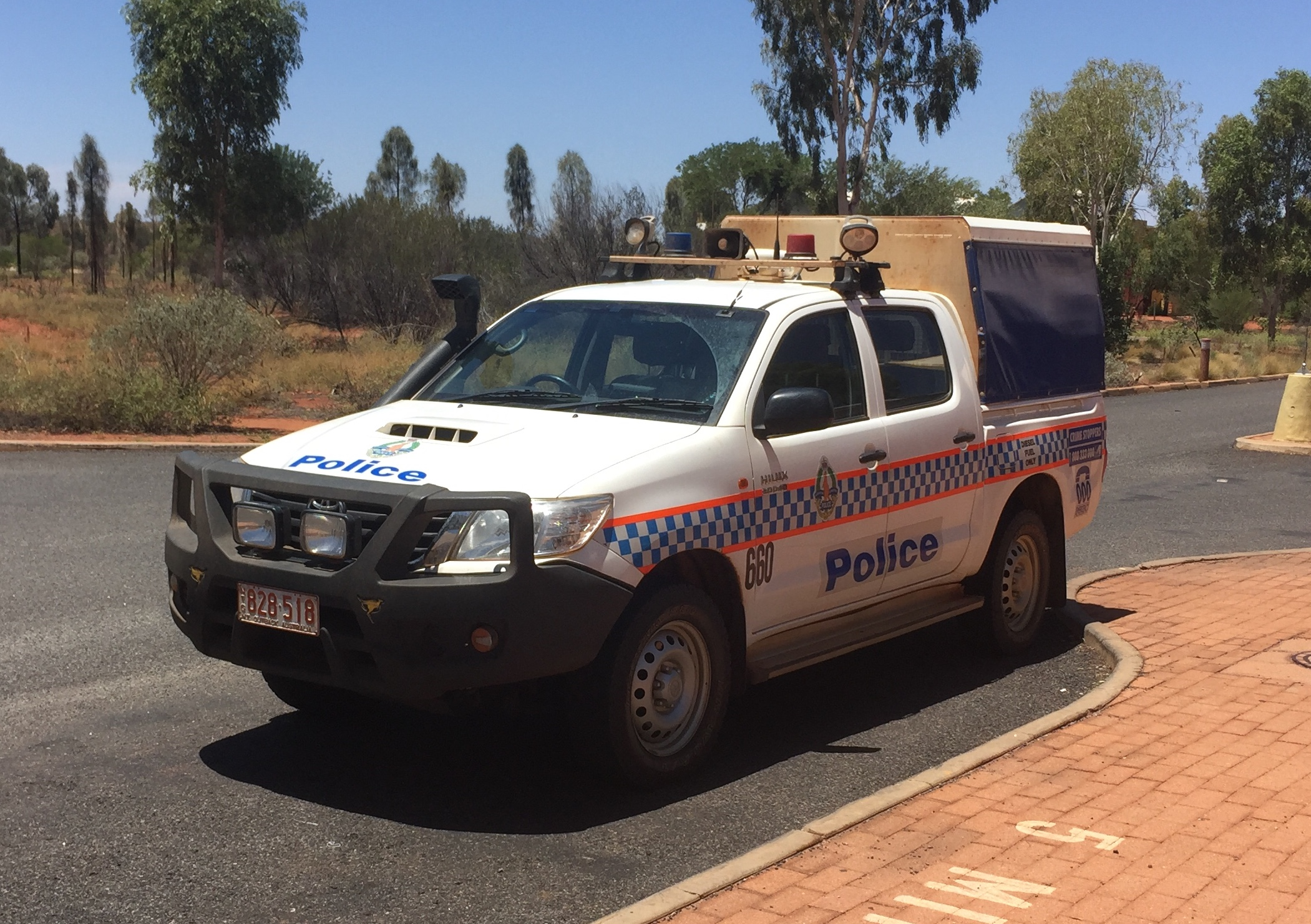
Toyota Hilux

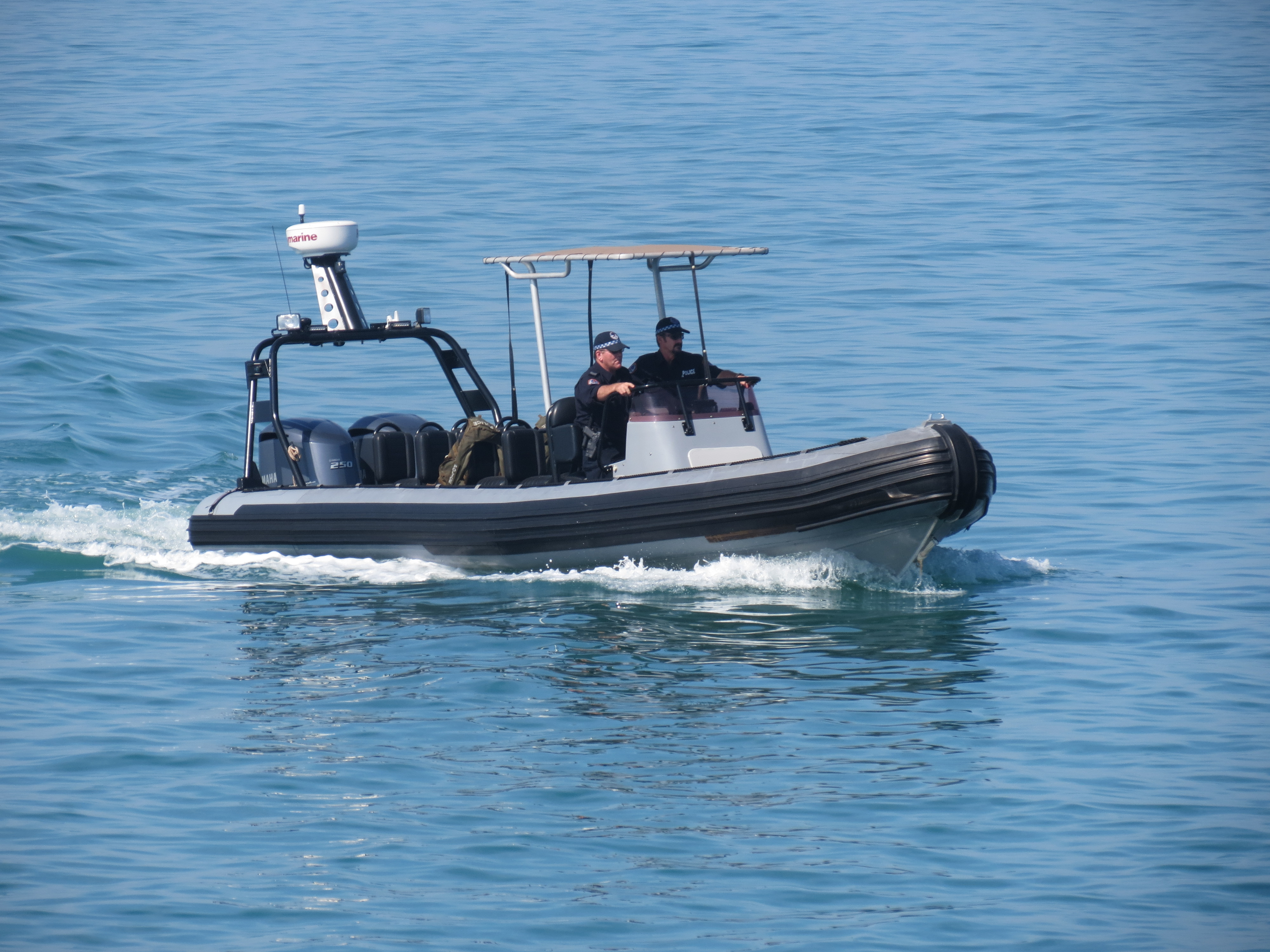
Patrol boat

The Northern Territory Police mostly use LAC response vehicles include Ford Falcon sedans, Holden VE Commodore and Toyota Hilux dual cab utes as caged vehicles (4x4 and 2WD) Turbo diesel. Specialist vehicles include the Toyota Land Cruiser 4WD.

Highway Patrol vehicles usually consist of a combination of marked and unmarked Holden VY SS Commodores and Ford Falcon XR6II. Other specialist sections and units use a variety of police vehicles including Isuzu trucks, and fixed wing Pilatus PC-12 aeroplanes.

The Northern Territory police recently acquired Kia stingers to add to their Road Policing Command fleet.

== Ranks ==
Northern Territory Police currently use the following ranks.

Recruit; Constable	Constable; First Class	Senior; Constable	Sergeant	Senior; Sergeant	Superintendent	Commander	Assistant; Commissioner	Deputy; Commissioner	Commissioner

== Officers killed on duty ==
- 7 November 1883, Mounted Constable John Shirley, aged 27 years from dehydration while searching for men who had murdered a man at Lawson's Creek.
- 1 August 1933, mounted constable Albert Stewart McColl was speared to death at Woodah Island in Arnhem Land.
- 17 August 1948, Constable Maxwell Gilbert, aged 27 years when the vehicle he was driving overturned just north of Wauchope. He was escorting a prisoner to Alice Springs.
- 9 June 1952, constable William Bryan Condon was shot twice after confronting a gunman.
- 16 June 1967, inspector Louis Hook died from extensive injuries from a rollover near Pine Creek.
- 9 June 1970, sergeant Colin Eckert was killed in a head-on collision in Katherine.
- 11 December 1981, senior constable Allen Price aged 44 years died of a heart attack while attempting to stop a disturbance in Mataranka.
- 29 January 1984, detective sergeant Ian Bradford died when the police vehicle he was a passenger in went over the edge of the wharf in Darwin.
- 3 August 1999, Brevet sergeant Glen Huitson was killed in a gun battle with bushman Rodney Ansell on the Stuart Highway.

== Indigenous deaths associated with police contact ==
- In 1874 Constable Samuel Gason led a punitive expedition resulting in up to 90 Aboriginal people being shot dead around Barrow Creek.
- In 1875 Corporal George Montagu led a punitive expedition resulting in up to 150 Aboriginal people being shot dead around the Roper River.

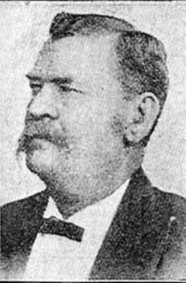
Constable William George Stretton

- In 1878 Constable William George Stretton led a punitive expedition resulting in at least 17 Aboriginal people being shot dead near the Daly River.
- In 1882 Constable Augustus Lucanus and Corporal George Montagu led a punitive expedition where a number of Aboriginal people were shot dead.
- In August 1884 Constable William Willshire led a punitive expedition resulting in around 50 Aboriginal people being shot dead.
- In September 1884 Constable William Willshire shot dead at least 3 Aboriginal people.
- In September 1884, ex-Constable Augustus Lucanus led a punitive expedition which "dispersed" two large "mobs" of Aboriginal people.
- In October 1884 Corporal George Montagu led a punitive expedition resulting in around 150 Aboriginal people being shot dead.
- In October 1884 Constable Allan MacDonald shot dead 14 Aboriginal people.

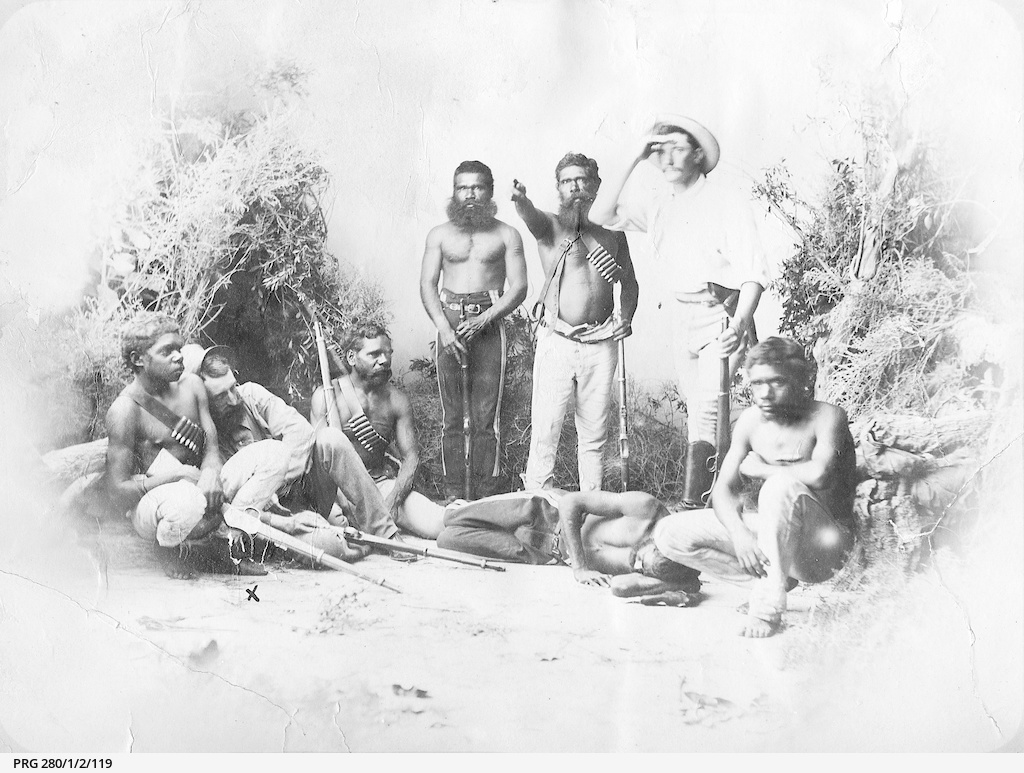
Constable William Willshire (standing) and Constable Erwein Wurmbrand (resting) with their Native Police troopers

- In November 1884 Constable Erwein Wurmbrand shot dead 7 Aboriginal people.
- In December 1884 Constable William Willshire shot dead 3 Aboriginal people.
- In June 1885 Constable Erwein Wurmbrand led a punitive expedition which resulted in at least 17 Aboriginal people being shot dead.
- In October 1885 Constable Cornelius Power shot dead at least four Aboriginal people.
- In 1886 Constable William Curtis led a punitive expedition that resulted in 52 Aboriginal people being shot dead and another 12 falling to their deaths.
- In March 1887 Constable William Willshire shot dead an Aboriginal man.
- In July 1887 Constable Thomas Daer shot dead two Aboriginal men.
- In 1890 Constable William Willshire shot dead two Aboriginal men.
- In 1891 Constable William Willshire shot dead two Aboriginal men.
- In 1910 Constable Uriah William Holland led a punitive expedition where two Aboriginal men were shot dead.
- In 1914 Constable Alfred Victor Stretton shot dead an Aboriginal prisoner.
- In 1918 Constable O'Connor led a punitive expedition which resulted in seven Aboriginal people being shot dead.

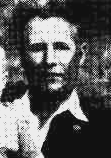
Constable William George Murray

- In 1928 Constable William George Murray led several punitive expeditions resulting in up to 200 Aboriginal people being killed in what is known as the Coniston massacre. Constable Murray was later acquitted. In 2018 the then Commissioner of NT Police Reece Kershaw, issued an apology for the agencies involved in the massacre.
- In 1933 Constable Cameron Gordon Heaslop Stott tied an Aboriginal woman named Dolly to a tree and beat and starved her to death.
- In 1934 Constable Bill McKinnon shot dead an Aboriginal man named Yokununna.
- In 1980 Constable Laurence Richard Clifford shot dead Johnny Jabanardi.
- In 1990 Sergeant Bruce Grant shot dead a mentally-ill Aboriginal man.
- In 2002 Senior Constable Robert Whittington shot dead Robert Jongmin.
- In 2009 Constables Corey Brown and Jason Mather dragged Aboriginal man Cedric Trigger along a watch-house floor after he had fallen out of the back of their police wagon onto concrete while handcuffed and left him face-down where he died of a subdural haemorrhage.

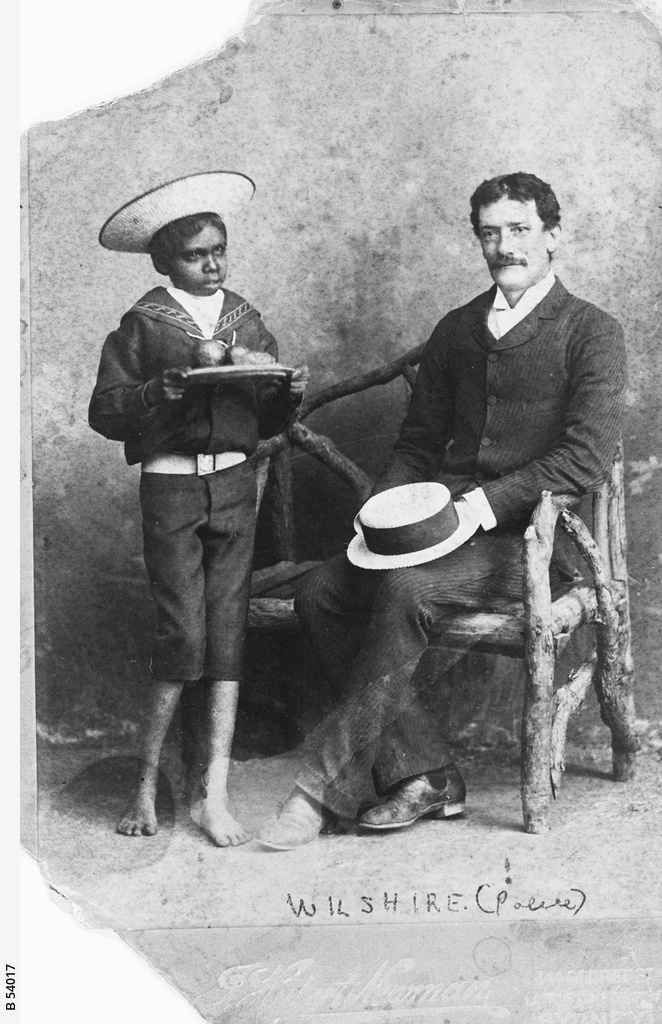
Constable William Willshire with an Aboriginal child servant

- In 2012 Constable Gareth Evans dragged Aboriginal man Kwementyaye Briscoe along a watch-house floor, threw him into a counter and left him face-down on a mattress with his neck twisted against a concrete block where he died.
- In 2019 Constable Zachary Brian Rolfe shot dead Kumanjayi Walker after the teenager stabbed Rolfe. Rolfe was later charged with murder with the prosecution arguing that only the first shot was justified and the second and third shots fired by Rolfe were excessive. Rolfe was acquitted of all charges by a jury that found Rolfe was acting in self-defence. In 2025, a coronial inquest into the shooting found that Rolfe was racist, and that racism was normalised within the Alice Springs police station where he worked, and that the force had "significant hallmarks of institutional racism". During the inquest, grotesque examples of racism were uncovered at the force's tactical unit the Territory Response Group.
- In 2025 two plain clothes police officers arrested Kumanjayi White, a 24 year old Walpri man, after he allegedly assaulted a security guard in a supermarket in Alice Springs. The plain clothes officers subdued him on the ground. Sometime later general duties officers arrived, it was then discovered that he had lost consciousness. CPR was commenced. He later died in the Alice Springs Hospital.

== Controversies ==
On 17 August 1980, an infant Azaria Chamberlain and her family members were camping near Ayers Rock. It was alleged the girl was snatched away by a dingo, but for a number of reasons, the parents were extradited to the Northern Territory and their vehicle seized. The parents Michael and Lindy Chamberlain were criminally charged and convicted; later overturned in 1988. A review of the forensic science section, a royal commission, and several inquests were held into the police investigation and cause of Azaria's death.

== Commissioners ==
Rank	Name	Post-nominals	Term began	Term ended	Notes
Commissioner of the Northern Territory Police
	Paul Heinrich Matthias Foelsche		1870	1904	
	Nicholas John Waters		1905	1923	
Major	George Vernon Dudley		1924	1927	
The Office of Commissioner was held by the Government Resident, a position now known as the Administrator of the Northern Territory
	Clive William Graham		1964	1966	
	Sydney James Bowie		1966	1967	
	William James McLaren		1967	1978	
Commissioner	Peter McAulay	AO, QPM	1978	1988	
Commissioner	Mick Palmer	AO, APM	1988	1994	
	Brian Charles Bates		1994	2001	
	Paul Cameron White		2001	2009	
	John McRoberts		2009	2014	
	Reece Kershaw	APM	2014	2019	
	Jamie Chalker	APM	2019	2023	
	Michael Murphy	APM	2023	18 March 2025	

== See also ==
- Crime in the Northern Territory
