= Death of Kumanjayi Walker =

Fatal shooting of an Aboriginal Australian man by a police officer during arrest

Charles Arnold Walker (13 October 2000 – 9 November 2019), for cultural reasons known as Kumanjayi Walker since his death, (Note: In Warlpiri culture, the term Kumanjayi is used in place of the deceased's given name during a specified period of mourning. It is spelt this way around desert areas in the NT, but in other places may be spelt "Kwementyaye" (as in the case of the death of Perry Jabanangka Langdon in 2015). "Taboos as a result of a death have a temporal element. A name given as Kunmanjayi [sic] at the time of writing may be restored later".) was a Warlpiri man who was shot and killed by police while resisting arrest in the remote Aboriginal Australian community of Yuendumu, Northern Territory, in November 2019. Walker stabbed Constable Zachary Rolfe with a pair of scissors. Rolfe subsequently fatally shot him and was charged with murder three days later, but was acquitted in March 2022. Thousands of people rallied in Alice Springs in the days following the attempted arrest, and further protests followed in capital cities around Australia. After the acquittal of Rolfe a campaign entitled "Justice for Walker" has continued.

== Kumanjayi Walker ==
Charles Arnold Walker, later known as Kumanjayi Walker, was born on 13 October 2000 in Alice Springs to a Luritja woman. His mother drank heavily during the pregnancy, and his family believed he had fetal alcohol spectrum disorder. She gave up Walker to the Alice Springs hospital when he was seven months old. He was then raised by one of his mother's friends, Leanne Oldfield, who was living with Walker's father, Frank, at the Warlpiri camp on the outskirts of Alice Springs. His home environment was marred by alcohol abuse and physical violence, and a constant struggle between various relatives for custody. He spent time in Adelaide and in a transient camp outside Katherine before moving to Yuendumu in 2010. By the age of 12, both of Walker's biological parents had died as had his step-father. He had minimal schooling, suffered from chronic ear infections, was difficult to control and spent some school days roaming for food and distractions.

Walker had a history of breaking and entering, vandalism, theft and assault throughout his teens. He spent time in the Don Dale Youth Detention Centre and in the Alice Springs Youth Detention Centre where he was once restrained by a police dog. In 2015, at the age of 15, Walker began a relationship with a 14-year-old girl, who became a victim of his physical attacks in 2018. She had a domestic violence order out on Walker but regarded herself as his girlfriend on the day of his killing.

In November 2018, Walker faced court charged with two counts of assault. As a condition of his bail, he completed a rehabilitation program at the Central Australian Aboriginal Alcohol Programs Unit (CAAAPU) in Alice Springs and returned to live at the Warlpiri camp. Having complied with these conditions through to March 2019, he requested permission to visit Yuendumu for his “little sister”'s funeral, and this was granted by his Community Youth Justice Officer. However, he tampered with his electronic monitoring device and two days later, he broke into the town store with an accomplice, destroying equipment and stealing up to $7,000 worth of cigarettes.

== Zachary Rolfe ==
Zachary Brian Rolfe was born in Canberra. In 2010 he enlisted in the Australian Army, serving in Afghanistan with the Townsville-based 1st Battalion, Royal Australian Regiment. After being discharged in 2015, he applied to a number of Australian police forces, and was accepted by the Northern Territory force, enrolling at the academy in Darwin in May 2016. Rolfe graduated as dux of his squad and was posted to Alice Springs in Central Australia – his first preference. In December 2016, during his first week with the NT Police, he rescued two tourists from flood waters near Alice Springs, for which he and a colleague were awarded the Bravery Medal in 2018. He joined the Alice Springs Immediate Response Team (IRT) in November 2017.

In 2018, a judge found that Rolfe had deliberately injured Malcolm Ryder, an Indigenous resident of Alice Springs, and then lied about it in court. Rolfe and five other officers had attended Ryder's residence with the intention to arrest Ryder's stepson. During the arrest, Ryder was injured and charged with hindering police. Police alleged that Ryder threw a phone at them, resisted and interfered with them. Ryder denied this, and alleged that Rolfe had slammed his face into the ground, leaving him unconscious in a pool of blood. At Ryder's trial, the judge dismissed the charges against him, and found that the evidence (including body camera footage and lack thereof) supported Ryder's version of events being more likely and that Rolfe had lied. NT Police considered referring Rolfe to the Director of Public Prosecutions for perjury charges over the Ryder incident, but decided against it.

On 4 April 2023, Zachary Rolfe was dismissed from the Northern Territory Police Force due to "serious breaches of discipline during their police career". The dismissal was related to a statement published online, that has been attributed to him. Rolfe intends to appeal the validity and legality of the decision. The coronial inquest into the death of Walker was ongoing at the time of dismissal.

== Shooting ==
=== Suspended sentence and first arrest attempt ===
In June 2019, Walker was sentenced to 16 months' jail for the November 2018 break-in. However, the judge backdated and partly suspended the sentence so that Walker could attend a rehabilitation program at CAAAPU. Eight days after transferring from prison to CAAAPU on 29 October, Walker cut off his monitoring device and absconded, heading back to Yuendumu once again. Since Walker had violated the terms of his suspended sentence, a warrant was issued for his arrest, and his girlfriend was warned. Acting on a tip-off, two Yuendumu constables Christopher Hand and Lanyon Smith confronted Walker at his girlfriend's grandparents house in Yuendumu on Wednesday 6 November. Walker lunged at the officers with a small axe or tomahawk; the police retreated and Walker ran off into the scrub, dropping the axe on the front porch.

Hand told the grandmother "he's lucky we didn't shoot him" and later told detectives that he froze and was frightened that Walker would assault him with the axe. Smith gave evidence in the Supreme Court that he "didn’t feel that he was going to hurt me" and that he saw the use of the axe as "more of an intimidation to get out of the room... a show to his partner... he just wanted to get away". Sergeant Julie Frost, the officer in charge of the Yuendumu station, spoke to the grandparents later that day, telling them also that Walker could have been shot. Frost told them that Walker had two hours to hand himself in at the station. The grandfather told Walker to hand himself and he nodded in response. After Walker hadn't handed himself in and police hadn't heard from the grandparents, on the Thursday morning, Frost after learning that a funeral was to be held for Walker's grandfather, told the grandparents that he could hand himself in after the funeral. The grandfather agreed to contact an Aboriginal community police officer who would contact police after the funeral.

Although Walker was a violent offender, the failed arrest was the first time he had threatened violence against police. The task of arresting him passed from officers based in Yuendumu to the Alice Springs-based Immediate Response Team. This team, which included Rolfe, arrived in the town on the evening of Saturday 9 November. The Supreme Court later heard that the IRT members were aware of the axe incident, and had viewed the body-worn camera footage from the failed arrest attempt.

=== Medical staff evacuated ===
On 6 November, unidentified offenders ransacked the home of the manager of Yuendumu's medical clinic. The following day, the windscreen of her car was smashed, and on Friday she and her husband drove to Alice Springs, 300 km (190 mi) away, to have it fixed. Later that day, someone tried to break into the house again, as well as the home of a colleague at the clinic. That night, the homes and vehicles of two other nurses and a midwife were attacked with shovels, pickaxes and other weapons. There had been similar incidents in the preceding months, and, fearing for the nurses' safety, health department officials decided to evacuate all medical staff and their families on the morning of 9 November.

=== Second arrest attempt and shooting ===
The shooting took place on the evening of 9 November 2019. Many people had come to Yuendumu that day for the funeral of Walker's grandfather, which had taken place in the afternoon. Frost had planned to arrest Walker with the aid of the IRT members and a dog handler on the following morning if he didn't show that evening as arranged.

The four IRT members deployed to Yuendumu constables Zachary Rolfe, James Kirstenfeldt, Adam Eberl and senior constable Anthony Hawkings had all arrived by 7pm on 9 November. The dog handler senior constable Adam Donaldson had earlier arrived. Whether the officers were fully aware of Frost's plan, authorised by superiors, to arrest Walker the following morning, is disputed. That night the officers were to conduct high-visibility patrols through the town and respond to any calls for police assistance, and if they inadvertently came across Walker, they were to arrest him.

Rolfe and the other IRT members accompanied by Donaldson left the station just after 7pm and attended at his girlfriend's grandparents house and shortly after arrived at his grandmother's house. The officers hadn't planned, if Walker was armed, how they would arrest him. Walker at this time was at his grandmother's house with his foster-mother Leanne Oldfield. In addition to Walker and Oldfield, other people present at the home included Oldfield's partner and a young woman with a baby and a toddler. The officers were armed with Glock pistols, tasers, Hawkings was also armed with an AR-15 rifle and Kirstenfeldt had brought a shotgun for bean bag rounds but had left it in the car.

Rolfe and Eberl entered the house, found Walker at 7:21 pm and attempted to arrest him. Hawkings was at the side of the house with his rifle. Meanwhile, Kirstenfeldt was speaking to a neighbour and Donaldson was in his car. A struggle ensued during which Walker produced a pair of surgical scissors and stabbed Rolfe in the shoulder. Eberl immediately punched Walker in the head, quickly followed by Rolfe striking him in the face. Rolfe then shot Walker in the back with his Glock, which caused Walker to fall on a mattress with Eberl on top of him. Then, 2.6 seconds later, Rolfe leant over to where Walker was lying and fired twice more into the side of Walker's torso.

According to court documents, the assumed facts (comprising body-worn camera footage from Eberl and Hawkings along with transcripts from the audio) include the following:

At 7:21:50pm, the accused stated to the deceased, "Just put your hands behind your back." The deceased then retrieved a secreted pair of scissors and stabbed the accused in the left shoulder before the first shot was fired.

At 7:22:01pm, the accused fired one shot into the middle right region of the deceased's back. This shot was fired at close range.

Dr Marianne Tiemensma, a specialist forensic pathologist, undertook a post mortem examination of the deceased. She concluded that this shot was not fatal.

The accused fired a shot at 7:22:04pm into the deceased's left side torso (2.6 seconds after the first shot).

At 7:22:05pm, the accused fired another shot into Walker's left torso (0.53 seconds after the second shot).

Ballistic evidence indicates the second and third shots were fired at a distance of no more than five centimetres from the deceased.

Dr Marianne Tiemensma's conclusion from the post mortem examination is that the fatal shot was either the second or third shot.

At 7:23:10 pm, handcuffs had been successfully applied to the deceased.

=== Immediate aftermath ===
After shooting Walker three times, Rolfe asked if Eberl was okay. Eberl replied he was alright and then yelled at the moaning and critically injured Walker: "Oi, don't fuck around, I'll fucking smash you mate". Rolfe and Eberl then turned Walker onto his belly and pinned him to the ground while they removed the scissors from his grasp and handcuffed him. Seeing blood coming from Walker's body, Rolfe wanted to put gloves on before touching Walker further. Walker was yelling out to Oldfield for help while women around the house started to scream. Hawkings and Kirstenfeldt, armed with an AR-15 and a shotgun, were shouting at nearby residents to stay back while a handcuffed Walker was dragged out of the home.

Walker was taken to Yuendumu police station, placed in a cell and given first aid. The police barricaded themselves in the station, with Frost requesting medical assistance to be sent as the local health clinic was closed. At 8:36pm Walker died. About a hundred local people congregated outside the police station and, not receiving any information about Walker's condition, became exasperated with a few starting to throw rocks onto the police station roof. These were soon calmed by elders and persuaded to sit down.

=== Police reinforcements flown in ===
A police superintendent approved the evacuation of the station as officers in the station were concerned it could be breached. The decision to evacuate was overturned by senior officers as the officers were preparing to leave. Just after 9pm, the ambulance from Yuelamu arrived with two nurses. At 10:50pm, a plane landed at the airstrip with six police officers from Alice Springs. A convoy of three vehicles left the station to collect them, consisting of two police vehicles with an ambulance in-between the police vehicles. The ambulance was a ruse so that local people would think that the plane was the Royal Flying Doctor Service come to fly Walker to hospital. After collecting the officers, the two police vehicles left the airstrip without the ambulance. Angered by the turn of events, a man in a crowd threw a stone at the ambulance as it sped past driving back to the station, smashing the windscreen and causing a head injury to the female nurse driving. She later likened the people in the crowd to a movie scene "when you see the zombies are coming for you."

At about 1:30am, police Territory Response Group members arrived via plane from Darwin. With the police reinforcements preparing themselves in riot gear at the station, many of the local people decided to return to their homes for the night. Members of Walker's family were not notified of his death in the police cell until 8 am the next day.

Some members of the Aboriginal community have since blamed Walker's death on the absence of medical staff at the clinic or the RFDS decision not to attend the incident. Subsequently, Yuendumu elders successfully demanded that the local clinic manager, who had been out of town at the time having her vandalised car repaired, not be allowed to return.

== The Queen v Rolfe ==
=== Decision to prosecute ===
Although an investigation into the incident was initiated, senior police sought to expedite charges against Rolfe. Rather than wait for detectives to gather evidence, Deputy Commissioner Michael White, Assistant Commissioner Nick Anticich and Crime Commander Martin Dole sent the body-worn camera footage to prosecutors on 11 November – an unusual step so early in a case. On the basis of the footage alone, Director of Public Prosecutions Jack Karczewski determined that murder charges should be laid. Karczewski and senior police directed that charges be laid no later than the November, and took the unusual step of demanding investigators sign non-disclosure agreements about the case.

The Chief Minister of the Northern Territory, Michael Gunner, flew to Yuendumu on 12 November and promised the community that "consequences [would] flow".

=== Charges and plea ===
Three days after Walker's killing, Rolfe was charged with:

- murder, contrary to section 156 of the Criminal Code Act 1983 (NT);
- in the alternative, manslaughter, contrary to s. 160 of the Code; and
- in the further alternative, engaging in a violent act which caused the death of the deceased, contrary to s. 161A(1) of the Code.

After two and a half hours in a holding cell, a judge granted him bail.

The charges related only to Rolfe's second and third shots, which were considered to have been fatal. In the Northern Territory, murder carries a mandatory minimum sentence of 20 years' jail. Rolfe pleaded not guilty to all counts.

=== Legal challenges ===
In the Northern Territory, police officers are granted protection from civil and criminal liability in the performance of legally defined functions under s. 148B of the Police Administration Act 1978 (NT). The defence raised the question of whether shooting an offender in defence of a fellow officer – an act not specifically contemplated in the Act – was such a function. This question was considered by the full bench of the Supreme Court and, ultimately, the High Court of Australia. Rolfe was represented in the High Court case by high-profile barrister Bret Walker. In a unanimous decision, the full bench of the High Court held that the protection from liability applied only to "those of the common law ... and the power of arrest".

=== Murder trial ===
The court case was known as The Queen v Rolfe. Rolfe remained free on bail during the trial. Given the significant publicity surrounding the case, Rolfe's defence team successfully sought to have the trial moved from Alice Springs to Darwin.

The murder trial, before Supreme Court Justice John Burns, took five weeks. To find Rolfe guilty of murder, the jury would have to consider that the prosecution had proved that the officer intended to cause the death of the deceased or cause him serious harm. The prosecution would also need to prove:

- Rolfe was not acting in defence of himself or his partner when he fired the second and third shots;
- that his conduct was not reasonable in the circumstances; and
- that he was not acting in good faith in exercising his duty as a police officer.

The prosecution had hoped to use four previous complaints of excessive force by Rolfe during unrelated arrests as "tendency evidence"; however, Justice Burns agreed with the defence that these incidents were not relevant to the case, along with some text messages sent by Rolfe in which he suggested that there were "no rules" in policing with the semi-tactical squad. The defence argued that, while the case was tragic, Walker had been responsible for his fate. Barrister David Edwardson SC criticised the NT police executive and three of the prosecution witnesses, and said that the trial was not about non-compliance with orders, but about "what Zachary Rolfe saw, heard, felt, and perceived when he made that critical decision".

The jury deliberated for seven hours before reaching a unanimous not-guilty verdict on 11 March 2022. Following his acquittal, Rolfe told the waiting media that while he welcomed the verdict, "a lot of people are hurting today — Kumanjayi's family and his community... and I'm going to leave this space for them".

=== Report anticipating a reaction ===
Anticipating that members of the Yuendumu community would not receive closure in the event that Rolfe was acquitted, the NT Government distributed a "secret report" two days before the verdict was delivered. This report warned that Kumanjayi Walker's family, friends, and community had and would continue to experience trauma due to the nature of Walker's death. This report stated that the trauma could lead to "emotional responses being directed towards … targets including police, health, businesses".

== Media coverage ==
The shooting and trial were widely reported, both in Australia and internationally.

The national broadsheet The Australian provided extensive coverage of the case, including a podcast and documentary film, based on extensive interviews with Rolfe, police and members of the Aboriginal community in Yuendumu and Alice Springs. A series of articles about Walker's life, which portrayed him as little more than an habitual criminal, and included a description of his final moments, were published in the paper after the acquittal of the officer charged with his murder. The newspaper revealed the extent of Walker's criminal offending following the verdict, including repeated instances of domestic violence. The Australian journalist Rosemary Neill wrote that her newspaper had "long believed that only by honestly facing up to entrenched problems can solutions be found". The articles were described by several journalists, including from the ABC's Bridget Brennan, Network 10's Narelda Jacobs, and The West Australian political editor Lanai Scarr as unethical, insensitive, victim-blaming, irresponsible, and "a national disgrace". Media Diversity Australia's Madeline Hayman-Reber said that details of Walker's offending should have been suppressed because Walker's family had set "cultural protocols" to that effect at the start of the trial.

After the trial ended, outlets such as the ABC, NT News and The Guardian began publishing information about text messages sent by Rolfe, as well a previous incident where a Northern Territory court found Zachary Rolfe had deliberately injured Aboriginal man Malcolm Ryder during a violent arrest in 2018, and then Rolfe had lied about it in court. This information was not allowed as "tendency" evidence in the trial, and suppression orders made by the court had banned the media from publishing it earlier. Following the trial, Rolfe's lawyers argued it should remain suppressed, but the judge disagreed. Later, during the coronial inquest into Walker's death, NT Police stated that they had decided not to refer Rolfe to the public prosecutor for perjury charges over the Ryder arrest incident.

During the coronial inquest in September 2022, the NT Independent ran a series of articles based on a secret draft police report they obtained, authored by NT Police officer Superintendent Scott Pollock. The Pollock report makes a number of allegations of dishonesty by Zachary Rolfe as well as mismanagement and negligence by NT Police. The report was part of a brief of evidence provided to the coronial inquest, and its contents were subject to a suppression order. Following the publication of the articles, lawyers for NT Police alerted the coroner's court. The NT Independent then published an editorial defending their publication of the information. Police lawyers then labelled the publication "sensationalist inaccurate gutter reporting" and the Police Commissioner Jamie Chalker asked the court to find the NT Independent journalists in contempt of court. The NT Independent says they published their first six articles before the 6 September 2022 suppression order was in effect, and that the 12 August suppression order wasn't sent to the media, but that their reporting is in the public interest.

== Issues raised by the shooting and the trial ==
Issues were raised in the community and by media both after the shooting as well as after the trial.

While Aboriginal deaths in custody have long been a contentious issue in Australia, Walker's death was one which gained prominence during the global wave of protest over the murder of George Floyd in the United States in May 2020.

=== Police use of firearms ===
Following the verdict, Yuendumu elder Ned Jampijinpa Hargraves called for police in remote communities to be disarmed. His call was supported by the Aboriginal Peak Organisations of the Northern Territory and Aboriginal and Torres Strait Islander Social Justice Commissioner June Oscar. However, the Territory Government has ruled out this option, citing the risk to officers' safety.

=== Reasons for prosecution ===
Rolfe was the first Northern Territory police officer to be charged for the shooting death of an Aboriginal person since Robert Jongmin was shot dead by Senior Constable Robert Whittington in 2002. (Whittington was charged with "causing serious actual danger", but the prosecution was barred by a statute of limitations.) Some observers, such as Jamie McConnachie of National Aboriginal and Torres Strait Islander Legal Services, saw the trial as an opportunity to provide redress for deaths in custody more generally. Others noted that to see the trial in these terms was to ignore the facts of the case and deny the accused procedural fairness.

When Rolfe was arrested the following day at the police barracks in Darwin, one of the investigating officers noted in her police diary that she was "not comfortable with arrest and rushed process without full assessment of evidence and ability to investigate objectively". The rushed prosecution was also criticised by the union representing police.

Following suggestions of political interference in the decision to prosecute, the Territory's Independent Commissioner Against Corruption confirmed that he was considering whether to launch an inquiry into the case. Gunner denied being involved in the decision to prosecute, and characterised Police Commissioner Jamie Chalker as "an absolute straight shooter".

=== Race of jurors ===
Jurors for the case were drawn at random from the electoral roll in the Darwin area. Rolfe's defence team used the majority of their 12 challenges to remove people of colour and those of Asian descent. In the end, the jury selected were all white except for one young Asian woman. Even though Indigenous people account for 30% of the Northern Territory population, none were in the final jury. Warlpiri elders observed that no jurors in the Rolfe trial were "noticeably" Aboriginal and suggested that this may have affected the outcome.

=== Bail ===
Rolfe was not held on remand for the two years between his arrest and the verdict.

=== Justice for Walker ===
A campaign under the slogan "Justice for Walker" (#justiceforwalker) was begun in the aftermath of the shooting, with protesters rallying in Alice Springs days after the shooting, and in the capital cities of Australia in 2019. Over 1,000 people marched on the police station in Alice Springs calling for an independent investigation, with senior Warlpiri elder Harry Jakamarra Nelson addressing the crowd and stressing the peacefulness of their mission.

At a meeting at which the court adjourned the case in June 2020, the cause had gathered support as part of the Black Lives Matter protests following the murder of George Floyd in the US. Yuendumu elder Ned Jampijinpa Hargraves, who appeared on behalf of the family and community, appealed for a change to policing in remote communities, including a ban on the use of guns. Harry Jakamarra Nelson also urged for this to take place, when speaking on a panel marking the 13th anniversary of the Northern Territory intervention.

The campaign continued after the acquittal of Rolfe, led by Walker's cousin, Samara Fernandez-Brown.

=== ICAC probe ===
On 2 April 2022 the NT Independent Commissioner Against Corruption (ICAC), Michael Riches, announced that he would be examining the few days leading up to Rolfe's arrest to assess allegations of improper conduct relating to Rolfe's arrest and charge. He would then also decide on the value of a public inquiry to lay bare the matter. The allegations, made by the NT Police Association, the Country Liberal Party and Rolfe himself, suggest political interference by Chief Minister Michael Gunner or Police Commissioner Jamie Chalker. Gunner strongly denies the allegations and says he welcomes an inquiry.

== Coronial inquest ==
A coronial inquest into Walker's death was held in the Alice Springs Local Court commencing on 5 September 2022, preceded by a directions hearing on 29 March 2022 in Darwin Local Court. Crown Prosecutor Philip Strickland said that the trial had raised issues, and he expected that "evidence that could not be examined in this trial will be very carefully scrutinised at the inquest". The inquest revealed more details than the five-week trial was able to cover.

The family of Walker, who felt that the trial was unfair, and were hoping that the inquest would deliver justice for their relative's death, and were represented during the inquest by the Warlpiri Parrumpurru Committee's legal team, which included Julian McMahon KC and lawyer William "Bill" Doogue.

On 7 July 2025, Coroner Elizabeth Armitage released her findings stating that Rolfe and other officers at the Alice Springs police station "held racist attitudes", and that she could not rule out that this played a part in Walker's death.

== 2026 documentary 2.6 Seconds: Death in the Outback ==
A four-part documentary series titled 2.6 Seconds: Death In The Outback premiered on SBS TV, NITV and on SBS On Demand on 10 November 2026. Made by Darren Dale of Blackfella Films, the series documents the lead-up to the shooting, the incident itself, and the aftermath. Members of Walker's family, police officers, legal professionals, journalists, and community elders were interviewed for the series. Rolfe declined an invitation to participate in series.
