= Ron Grey =

Australian Army general (1930–2022)

Ronald Alwyn Grey
- Born: 2 July 1930; Subiaco, Western Australia
- Died: 20 January 2022 (aged 91); Canberra, Australian Capital Territory
- Relatives: Jeffrey Grey (son)
- Military career
- Allegiance: Australia
- Branch: Australian Army
- Service years: 1949–1983
- Rank: Major General
- Commands: Field Forces Command (1980–83); 7th Battalion, Royal Australian Regiment (1968–71)
- Conflicts: Korean War; Indonesia–Malaysia confrontation Vietnam War
- Awards: Officer of the Order of Australia; Distinguished Service Order; Mentioned in Despatches; Cross of Gallantry (Vietnam)
- Other work: Commissioner of the Australian Federal Police (1983–88)

Major General Ronald Alwyn Grey, AO, DSO (2 July 1930 – 20 January 2022) was a senior Australian Army officer who served as Commissioner of the Australian Federal Police (1983–88).

== Military career ==
Grey attended the Royal Military College, Duntroon, from 1948 to 1951 and served in the Australian Army until 1983, attaining the rank of major general in 1978. During his career he served in Borneo, Korea, and Vietnam.

Grey was Mentioned in Despatches in recognition of gallant and distinguished conduct in the Borneo Territories during the period 24 December 1965 to 23 June 1966.

He was awarded the Distinguished Service Order in 1971 for his role as the Commanding Officer of 7th Battalion, Royal Australian Regiment in Vietnam, and was also awarded the Vietnam Cross of Gallantry with Palm.

He served as Chief of Operations – Army, and as General Officer Commanding Field Force Command in the early 1980s. For his service in these positions, Grey was appointed an Officer of the Order of Australia.

== Commissioner, Australian Federal Police ==
Grey was the Commissioner of the Australian Federal Police from 1983 to 1988.

== Later career and death ==
In 1988, Grey was commissioned to undertake a review of the rescue services in New South Wales. The recommendations of his review were implemented by the New South Wales government in 1989.

Grey died on 20 January 2022, at the age of 91.

Military offices
| Preceded by Major General John Williamson | General Officer Commanding Field Force Command; 1980–1983 | Succeeded by Major General John Kelly |
Police appointments
| Preceded by Colin Woods | Commissioner of the Australian Federal Police; 1983–1988 | Succeeded by Peter McAulay |
