= Oberon High School =

Location
- Armstrong Creek, Victoria; Australia; 38.230°S 144.362°E

Information
- Type: Public secondary
- Motto: Shape your future, go one better
- Established: 1963
- Principal: Warren Dawson
- Staff: 100+
- Grades: 7–12
- Enrollment: 1000+
- Campus size: Suburban
- Colors: Blue, green and white
- Website: http://www.oberonhs.vic.edu.au/

Oberon High School is a secondary school located in Armstrong Creek, Geelong, Victoria, Australia. Established in 1963, in the Geelong suburb of Belmont, Oberon High is a single campus years 7–12 school, now situated in the suburb of Armstrong Creek. The current principal is Tim McMahon.

The student population is drawn from a very wide urban, rural and coastal area. It is in close proximity to three other large secondary colleges (two state and one non-government) and shares a common boundary with a state primary school.

== Extra-curricular activities ==
Students are encouraged to meet their individual interests and abilities from an extensive list of extra–curricular activities such as:

- Individual and team sport
- Annual drama production
- Jazz band, instrumental music and an extensive choir program
- An extensive camp program including; Central Australia, Tasmania, Indonesia, Germany and more
- Academic extension with science & engineering challenges
- Debating and public speaking festivals
- School for Student Leadership and Bogong Alpine Leadership opportunities
- Enviro team – coastal regeneration projects

=== Energy Breakthrough ===
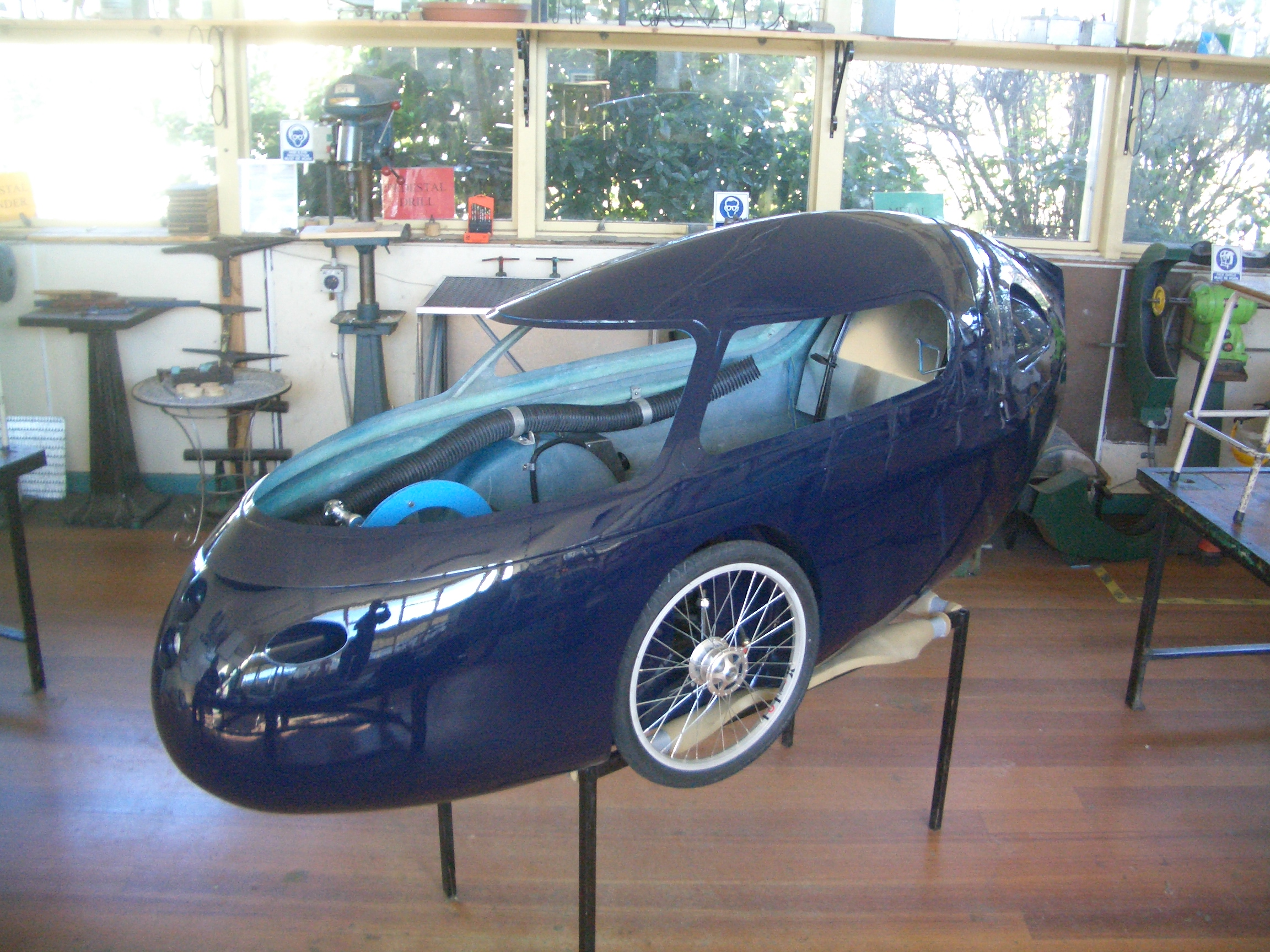
Midnight 2006 vehicle

Oberon students have competed in the RACV Energy Breakthrough. In 2008, "Midnight" finished fifth in the 24-Hour Hybrid Trial.

== Campus ==
=== Facilities ===
- an administration and library building
- three learning community buildings with adaptable spaces for a variety of learning activities
- a science arts and technology building
- a performing arts and physical education building with a competition grade double court
- four outdoor multipurpose courts and a sports oval

=== Sporting facilities ===
The school's grounds include:

- a football oval
- netball courts
- basketball courts
- handball courts
- passive recreation areas in garden settings

== Notable alumni ==
- Calum Von Moger, Australian actor and bodybuilder. He is best known for his portrayal of Arnold Schwarzenegger in the 2018 film, Bigger.
- Patrick Dangerfield, Australian rules footballer, playing for the Geelong Football Club, and formerly the Adelaide Football Club, Dangerfield's accomplishments include winning the Brownlow Medal in 2016, and finishing runner-up in 2017, the Leigh Matthews Trophy, and the AFLCA Champion Player of the Year Award. He is also a triple Carji Greeves Medallist and a Malcolm Blight Medallist. As well as receiving several media awards, he is an eight-time All Australian and has represented Australia four times in the International Rules Series. Dangerfield is also president of the AFL Players Association, and has been captain of Geelong since 2023.
- Adam Lynch is an Australian furniture designer and co-founder of Dowel Jones, a Melbourne-based studio known nationally and internationally for its furniture, lighting, and accessories.
- Travis Boak, Australian rules footballer, former captain of the Port Adelaide Football Club.
- Wendy Harmer, Australian author, children's writer, journalist, playwright, dramatist, radio show host, comedian, and television personality.
- Sarah Gross is an Australian creative director and co-founder of Storyfolk, a leading creative agency. Her work for not-for-profits, tech, and impact-driven organisations has won national and international design awards.
- Krissy Barrett, Commissioner of Australian Federal Police, 2025–
