= Reece Kershaw =

Australian police commissioner (born 1967/8)

Reece P Kershaw APM

8th Commissioner of the Australian Federal Police
- In office 2 October 2019 – 3 October 2025
- Governors General: David Hurley; Sam Mostyn
- Prime Minister: Scott Morrison; Anthony Albanese
- Minister: Peter Dutton; Karen Andrews; Mark Dreyfus; Tony Burke
- Preceded by: Andrew Colvin
- Succeeded by: Krissy Barrett

12th Commissioner of the Northern Territory Police Force (Note: Role was called: "Commissioner of Police, Fire and Emergency Services".)
- In office April 2014 – October 2019
- Administrator: Vicki O'Halloran
- Preceded by: John McRoberts
- Succeeded by: Jamie Chalker
- Chief Minister: Adam Giles; Michael Gunner

Personal details
- Born: 1967 or 1968 (age 58–59)

Reece Kershaw is an Australian police officer who was the commissioner of the Australian Federal Police from 2019 to 2025 and the commissioner of the Northern Territory Police from 2014 to 2019. Kershaw began his career with the AFP in 1988.

He was born in 1967 or 1968.

Kershaw announced his resignation as commissioner in August 2025. He was replaced by Krissy Barrett in October.
