= Australian Protective Service =

Former Australian government agency

The Australian Protective Service (APS) was an Australian Commonwealth law enforcement agency which existed between October 1984 and June 2004. The APS was created by the separation of the Uniformed Protective Service component of the Australian Federal Police (AFP) into a new agency based upon recommendations contained in the Stewart Royal Commission of Inquiry into Drug Trafficking. It was initially responsible for protecting personnel and property of the Australian government; foreign diplomatic missions in both Australia and overseas, Internationally Protected Persons (IPPs); and the provision of custodial services at immigration detention centres. The APS provided a uniformed protection presence at most sensitive government establishments through either a permanent guarding presence or mobile patrol and alarm response function.

From 1990 the APS commenced providing Counter Terrorist First Response duties at certain security-designated airports and establishments including the specialist Bomb Appraisal Officer function and, following the terrorist attacks of 11 September 2001, deployed Air Security Officers (ASOs – often referred to as 'sky marshals') on board Australian registered commercial aircraft. Close Personal Protection (CPP), or bodyguard, functions were never formally provided by the APS; where this has been a Commonwealth responsibility, the function was provided by the AFP.

Following an extensive review in 2002–2003 and as a result of the September 11 attacks, the staff and functions of the APS were reintegrated into the AFP in mid–2004 as part of Australian Government efforts to better coordinate the national response to terrorism.

== History ==
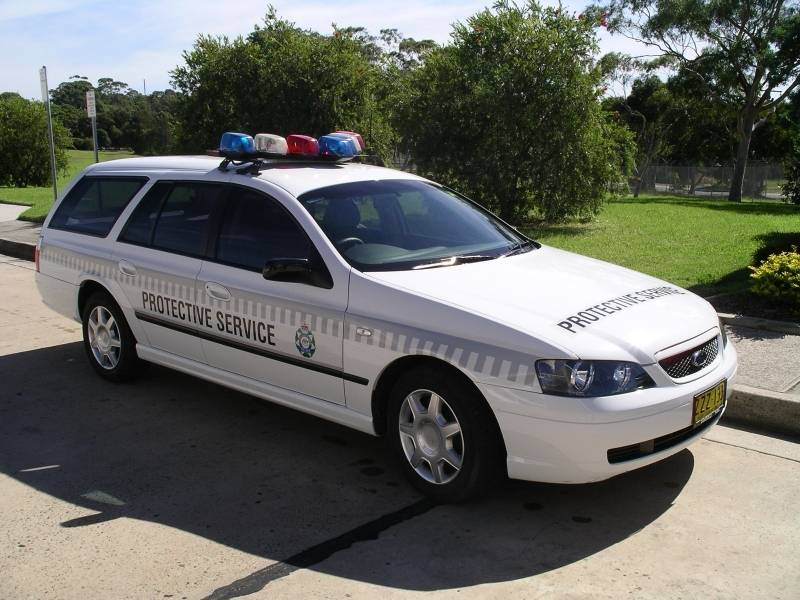
Pre 2004 APS Patrol car

The Australian Protective Service (APS) was established in 1984 when 420 Constables transferred from the Australian Federal Police.

The APS followed a tradition dating back through its predecessors the Protective Service component of the Australian Federal Police, the uniformed branch of the former Commonwealth Police and the former Peace Officer Guard. What follows is a brief history of the Commonwealth Law Enforcement and Security Service which led up to the inception of the Australian Protective Service (APS).

Australia's first Commonwealth Police Force was short lived – surviving only two years between December 1917 and 1919 being set up following an altercation between the then Prime Minister of Australia, William Morris (Billie) Hughes and a heckler at a rally in Queensland after local police sergeant declined to become involved 'in a Federal matter'. In later years discussions between Commonwealth government and state authorities resulted in the birth of the Commonwealth Investigation Service – a plainclothes unit with the responsibility of conducting investigations into specific breaches of Commonwealth legislation. The early 1930s saw the formation of the Peace Officer Guard with the aim of protecting Commonwealth property and interests. The Peace Officer Guard (POG) operated at such establishments as munitions factories, research facilities and certain Commonwealth Government departments. The Australian Security Intelligence Organisation (ASIO) came into existence in 1949, absorbing some of the functions of the Commonwealth Investigations Service and assuming new areas of responsibilities. The Commonwealth Police was re-formed in 1960, absorbing both Peace Officer Guards and Commonwealth Investigations Service officers. In 1975 the most ambitious plan to restructure Australia's national police service was attempted by the Commonwealth Government. An amalgamation of Commonwealth Police, Northern Territory Police and Australian Capital Territory Police forces, Department of Customs and Excise and Special Reports Branch of the Department of Immigration would have produced the "Australia Police". However, the amalgamation was abandoned later the same year following a change of Government. The bombing of the Hilton Hotel in Sydney during the Commonwealth Heads of Government Meeting (CHOGM) on 13 February 1978 prompted the Federal Government to commission an inquiry into Australia's national police service by former London Metropolitan Police Commissioner, Sir Robert Mark. As a consequence of this inquiry, on 19 October 1979, the Commonwealth Police and the Australian Capital Police Forces were amalgamated to form the Australian Federal Police which, shortly after, was expanded to assume the functions of the former Narcotics Section of the Bureau of Customs.

The Australian Federal Police was initially established as a two component force, with General Policing and Protective components. As previously mentioned, prior to 1960, Federal Law Enforcement was carried out by two organisations, the Commonwealth Investigative Service and Peace Officer Guard. The primary function of the Protective Service Component of the AFP was to continue the duties which were originally laid down for the POG. On 14 December 1983 the federal government decided that the Protective Service Component of the AFP should be abolished and a separate, dedicated protective security service established. Subsequently the Australian Federal Police (Amendment) Act 1984 was passed by Federal Parliament and came into force on 19 October 1984. This resulted in the abolition of the Protective Service Component and on day one (20 October 1984) the establishment of the Australian Protective Service within the Department of Administrative Services with the transfer of 420 Constables under Section 9f of the Public Service Act. The first Director of the APS was Peter Dawson, previously an Assistant Secretary of the Purchasing Division within the Department of Administrative Services.

The Australian Protective Service was the Commonwealth Government's specialist custodial, protective security and Counter Terrorist law enforcement agency. Plain clothed operations were normally restricted to members of the NSW Region Escort Response Group (ERG) and the more recently introduced Air Security Officers (Sky Marshals). However, Protective Service members in locations such as Darwin deployed regularly in the mid to late 90s to escort Immigration detainees, usually in civilian attire to blend in on domestic aircraft.

The APS was responsible for the protection of property in which the Commonwealth, a foreign country or an international organisation had an interest, persons holding office under the Commonwealth, their families and internationally protected persons. The APS also operated some functions in the contestable private sector area. With the sale of Australian airport facilities the APS contracted for the provision of Counter Terrorism First Response (CTFR) role to the airport operators.

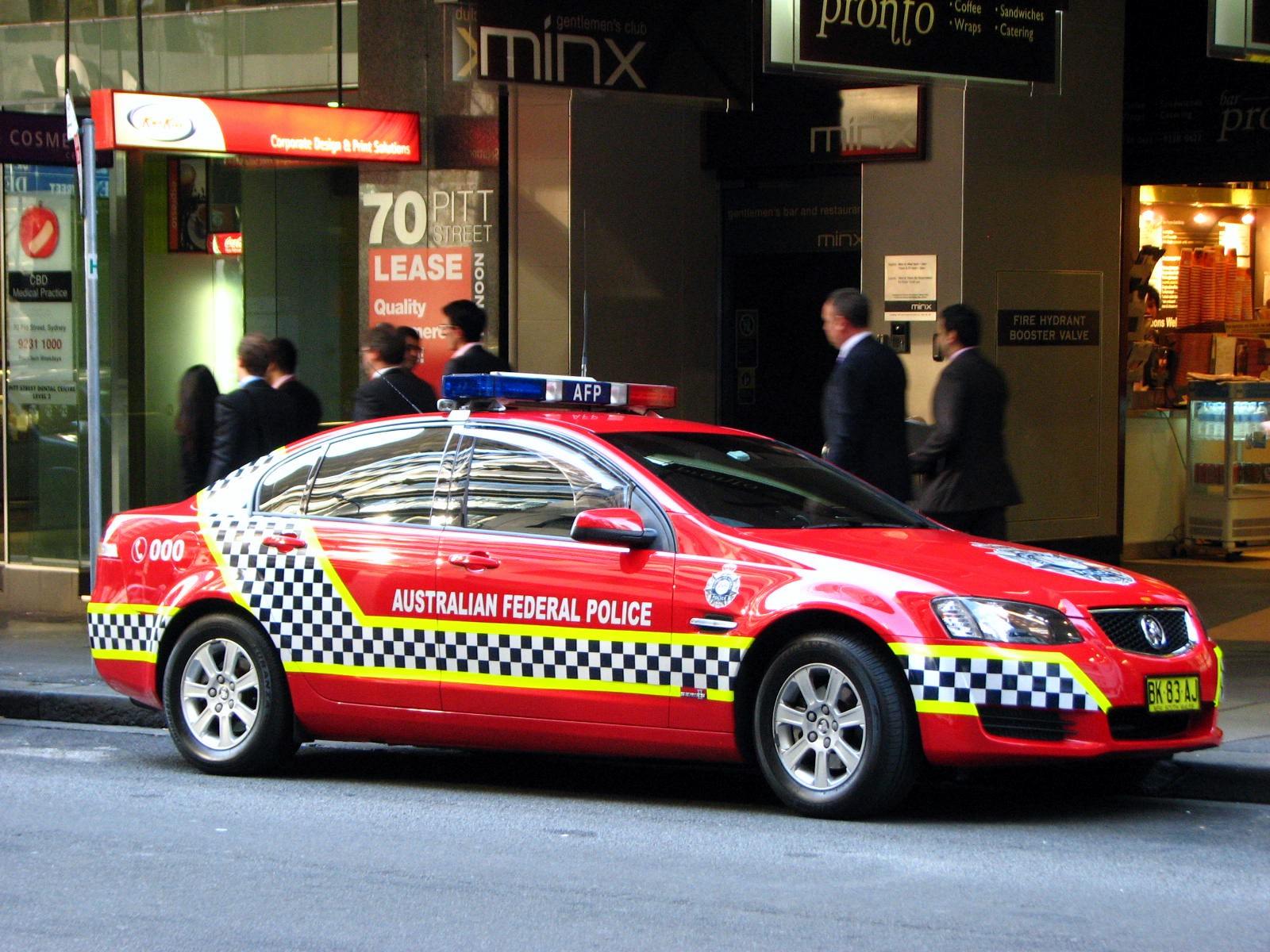
AFP Uniformed Protection patrol car (2007)

Unlike other law enforcement agencies the APS had limited internal honours and awards, the most coveted being the Australian Protective Service Directors Award conferred by the APS Director as the head of the Agency.

Following the September 11 attacks the Commonwealth Government conducted a review of counter terrorism arrangements. As a result it was decided to recombine the Australian Federal Police (AFP) and the APS in order to ensure the closest possible co-ordination between two of Australia's key counter terrorist agencies. The Australian Protective Service Amendment Bill 2002 was introduced into Parliament with the intention of making the Australian Protective Service (APS) an operating division of the Australian Federal Police (AFP). The merger occurred on 1 July 2004 when the Australian Protective Service (with 1327 employees) became an operating division of AFP, the Specialist Protective Command.

== Present ==
Protective Service Officers (PSOs) are now employed within the AFP's Specialist Protective Command. Their primary function remains the protection of sites of significance across Australia including Parliament House in Canberra; the residences of the Prime Minister and Governors-General; Foreign Embassies and Consulates in Canberra, Sydney, Melbourne and Perth; the Australian Nuclear Science and Technology Organisation, Joint defence facilities such as the Australian Defence Force Headquarters in Canberra, Holsworthy Barracks, Garden Island Naval Base, Victoria Barracks, the Pine Gap US defence installation, plus a number of sensitive covert locations in Australia and internationally. Protective Service Officers have sworn powers under Section 14 of the AFP Act 1979 to stop, request identification, search and arrest within their designated jurisdiction.

== Roles and functions ==
Some of the key roles undertaken by the APS included:

- High-level security at the residences of the governor-general and the prime minister of the Commonwealth of Australia
- Protection of Parliament House, and the Office of the Prime Minister and Cabinet
- Protection of foreign embassies and consulate offices within Australia (such as the United States Diplomatic mission to Australia)
- Protection of sensitive defence establishments, including Defence Headquarters at Russell Offices in Canberra; the joint Australian/US communications facility at Pine Gap in the Northern Territory; the former atomic testing site at Maralinga in South Australia; the Australian Defence Signals facility at Geraldton and the naval communications station at Exmouth, both in Western Australia
- Within Canberra ACT, the APS performed a uniformed protection function at The High Court of Australia, The Prime Minister's Suite, The Department of Defence Russell Offices, The Department of Prime Minister and Cabinet, Official Establishments ACT (Prime Ministers Lodge and Government House Canberra, The Government Printing Office, The Combat Data Systems Centre (CDSC) Navy Fyshwick, Campbell Park Offices, The Diplomatic Protection Unit, Air Services Australia, West Block Offices, Defence Mobile Patrol, Mobile Patrol Group/Dog Squad and the Joint Services Staff College.
- Protection of the Australian Nuclear Science and Technology Organisation (ANSTO) at Lucas Heights and other sensitive nuclear storage facilities.
- Perform security and escort protection for Commonwealth VIPs.
- Provide explosive detection and general duties canines.
- Provide a mobile patrol capability (integrated with the canine unit in Canberra) providing patrols and alarm response at government facilities within the ACT such as Comcar and the Dept of Admin Services in Fyshwick.
- Provide mobile patrol and alarm response functions at sensitive public entities within the ACT such as ACTEW (ACT Electricity and Water).
- Conduct protective security risk reviews for other Commonwealth agencies, and broader organisations dealing with Commonwealth interests.
- Security and escorting of sensitive and/or high value items in which the Commonwealth Government had an interest.
- Security and later also fire alarm monitoring for Commonwealth agencies and other entities.
- Deployment of Air Security Officers (ASOs) aboard Australian-registered commercial passenger aircraft.
- Augmentation of security at other facilities or for designated operations, including during protest activity at immigration detention centres and as part of the security arrangements for the Commonwealth Heads of Government Meeting (CHOGM) in Queensland in 2001.

In 2007, the APEC Summit hosted in various Australian states and cities including Sydney had AFP Protective Service Officer involvement regarding enforcement and protection as world leaders including John Howard, George W. Bush and other government and economic leaders were in attendance.

== The Air Security Officer program ==
In response to the 11 September incidents, the Commonwealth instituted an Air Security Officer (ASO) Program under the APS. These employees were generally referred to in the media as Sky Marshals. The ASO Programme provided a discreet anti-hijacking capability for Australian civil aviation by providing armed security personnel on board aircraft. This involves both random and intelligence-led placement of armed ASOs on flights operated by Australian registered air carriers, including domestic and international flights into and out of Australia.

The program drew from a pool of applicants that included Defence Force personnel and employees of State Police Forces and the AFP, all of whom were sworn as PSOs for the AFP.

== Peacekeeping ==
A reflection of the AFP's international obligations is its peacekeeping role. The AFP's peacekeeping efforts are principally focused on the Pacific where the organisation assists in the law-enforcing efforts of many sovereign nations. As such, AFP Protective Service Officers are routinely deployed overseas to assist with peacekeeping operations in the Solomon Islands.

Protective Service Officers were deployed along with other Australian law enforcement officers in the Solomon Islands as part of RAMSI. The peacekeeping force suffered their first casualty on 22 December 2004 when PSO1 Adam Dunning was shot and killed while deployed on official duties in the Solomon Islands. Two former members of a local militia were charged but acquitted of Dunning's murder. Officer Dunning was buried with full police honours.

The main street of a new AFP International Training Village in Canberra was named Adam Dunning Drive in his memory. The $2.8 million training facility at Majura (Google Maps -35.250362, 149.207547) just outside Canberra, has been designed to replicate situations in regional countries to which personnel might be assigned.

== See also ==
- Australian Federal Police
