= Peter McAulay =

Australian Federal Police commissioner

Peter McAulay AO QPM

Commissioner of the Australian Federal Police
- In office 15 February 1988 – May 1994
- Preceded by: Ron Grey
- Succeeded by: Mick Palmer

Personal details
- Born: 30 November 1932 Adelaide, South Australia
- Died: 14 November 1995 (aged 62) Canberra, ACT
- Profession: Police officer

Ronald Peter McAulay AO QPM (30 November 1932 – 14 November 1995) was an Australian Federal Police commissioner.

== Biography ==
Peter McAulay at the age of 13 was Assistant Paymaster for General Motors Holden. He joined the South Australia Police as a junior constable on 8 January 1951, graduating from the South Australia Police Academy in 1953. He was made inspector in 1966, and in 1968 served in United Nations Peacekeeping Force in Cyprus (UNFICYP), ultimately acting as police advisor there in 1970, and leading a contingent of a multi-national police force. He returned to the South Australian Police in 1972 and held executive roles, ultimately being promoted to Detective Chief Superintendent. On 13 October 1978 he was appointed Commissioner of the Northern Territory Police.

He was appointed Commissioner of the Australian Federal Police in February 1988, and retired in June 1994.

He died from a respiratory illness on 14 November 1995 in Canberra.

== Honours and awards ==

Officer of the Order of Australia (AO)	13 June 1988, "For public service particularly with the Northern Territory Police Force."
Queen's Police Medal (QPM)	1 January 1975 "For distinguished police service"

== See also ==
- Australian Federal Police
- Law enforcement in Australia

Police appointments
Preceded by Ron Grey	Commissioner of the Australian Federal Police; 1988–1994	Succeeded by Mick Palmer
Preceded by William James McLaren	Commissioner of the Northern Territory Police; 1978–1988	Succeeded by Mick Palmer
