= Independent Commissioner Against Corruption (Northern Territory) =

Agency of the Northern Territory Government, Australia

Office of the Independent Commissioner Against Corruption (NT)
Agency overview
- Formed: 2018
- Type: Executive agency
- Jurisdiction: Northern Territory
- Headquarters: 9 Cavenagh St, Darwin, NT
- Minister responsible: Lia Finocchiaro, Chief Minister
- Website: icac.nt.gov.au

The Independent Commissioner Against Corruption (ICAC) is the head of the Office of the Independent Commissioner Against Corruption, an integrity agency of the Northern Territory Government with responsibility for investigating corruption in the Territory public sector. Since July 2021, this position has been led by Michael Riches.

The Commissioner operates under the Independent Commissioner Against Corruption Act 2017 (NT).

== History ==
The first holder of the office was Kenneth Fleming QC. He was appointed on 13 June 2018 and commenced in the position on 2 July 2018. The office started accepting reports on 30 November 2018.

In January 2020, the office received its 1000th complaint. At that time, 274 of the 848 complaints assessed had triggered some degree of investigation or referral. An investigation undertaken by ICAC found former Speaker Kezia Purick to have been responsible for corrupt conduct and serious breaches of public trust. Purick rejected the findings and took action in the Supreme Court after claiming that she was denied natural justice.

Fleming generated controversy when he addressed a rally in Alice Springs, held in the aftermath of the death of Kumanjayi Walker, a Warlpiri man who was shot by NT police officer Constable Zachary Rolfe. In trying to assure the community of his impartiality in the matter, he stated: "One of the most important messages today is: 'black lives matter'... Anybody who says contrary to that is guilty of corrupt behaviour." The statement led to accusations of bias, and Fleming, accepting that his words had been ill-chosen, stepped aside from involvement in matters concerning the case.

Fleming announced his early retirement in January 2021, and retired in July of that year. Michael Riches was nominated for the appointment in May 2021 and took it up on 6 July 2021.

On 2 April 2022, after the trial and acquittal of Rolfe on murder charges, Riches announced that he would be examining the few days leading up to Rolfe's arrest to assess allegations of improper conduct. He would then also decide on the value of a public inquiry to lay bare the matter. The allegations, made by the NT Police Association, the Country Liberal Party and Rolfe himself, suggested political interference by Chief Minister Michael Gunner or Police Commissioner Jamie Chalker. Gunner strongly denied the allegations and said that he welcomed an inquiry.

== Governance ==
The agency operates under the Independent Commissioner Against Corruption Act 2017 (NT). ICAC reports to the Chief Minister of the Northern Territory, whose department created it.

== Commissioners ==
=== Past ===
- Kenneth Fleming QC, 2 July 2018 to 6 July 2021

=== Incumbent ===
- Michael Riches, 6 July 2021 to present

Michael Riches was formerly a solicitor for South Australia Police, before a stint at the Crown Solicitor's Office and then three years as deputy SA ICAC commissioner from around mid-2018. He holds a Bachelor of Arts in Criminology and Legal Studies and a Bachelor of Laws and Legal Practice (Honours), both from Flinders University, as well as a Diploma in Public Safety.

== See also ==
- Independent Broad-based Anti-corruption Commission
- Independent Commission Against Corruption (New South Wales)
- Independent Commission Against Corruption (South Australia)
