= Krissy Barrett =

Australian Federal Police commissioner

Krissy Barrett APM

9th Commissioner of the Australian Federal Police
- Incumbent
- Assumed office 4 October 2025
- Prime Minister: Anthony Albanese
- Minister: Tony Burke
- Preceded by: Reece Kershaw

Personal details
- Born: Krissy Lee Barrett
- Education: Oberon High School

Krissy Barrett APM is the ninth Australian Federal Police commissioner, and the first woman to lead Australia's federal police force. She replaced Reece Kershaw as the Australian Federal Police Commissioner on 4 October 2025.

== Early life and career ==
Barrett began her career with the AFP as an administrative assistant, at the age of 21, within the Melbourne office of the AFP. She has experience in transnational serious and organised crime, as well as community policing, operations, and first response counter terrorism.

Barrett has had a 25-year career in law enforcement, including the investigation of the Bali bombings, and also she was involved in policing within the Solomon Islands. Until 2025, Barrett was deputy commissioner with the AFP, and she also managed the portfolio of national security. Her appointment as AFP commissioner will last five years.

== Honours and achievements ==

Australian Police Medal	12 June 2023
Police Overseas Service Medal	2004
National Emergency Medal	
National Police Service Medal	
National Medal	
AFP Service Medal	
AFP Operations Medal	2005
ACT Emergency Medal	
ACT Community Service Medal	
