= Territory Response Group =

- Active: December 1978 – present
- Country: Australia
- Agency: Northern Territory Police Force
- Type: Police tactical group
- Role: Law enforcement; Counter-terrorism; Search and rescue
- Part of: Territory Support Division
- Headquarters: Darwin

Structure
- Officers: 31

The Territory Response Group (TRG) is the police tactical group of the Northern Territory Police Force. The TRG is tasked to provide general and specialist support to other units of the Northern Territory Police Force (NTPF).

== History ==
In December 1978, the Emergency Squad was established following the introduction of the federal government National Anti-Terrorism Plan which required each state and territory police to establish and maintain a police tactical group. The Emergency Squad was subsequently renamed as the Task Force, which was later renamed as the Territory Response Section (TRS) and was then finally renamed as the Territory Response Group (TRG).

In 2016–17, the TRG "responded to or assisted with 131 general support tasks, 12 major events and 26 high-risk incidents". General support tasks can include civil unrests in communities, outstanding offender operations, surveillance and assisting with search warrants. In 2019–20, the TRG had over 30 search and rescue deployments.

Notable incidents include the arrest of fugitive bank robber Brenden Abbott in 1998, the arrest of Jonathon Andrew Stenberg in 2012, and responding to a riot at the Don Dale Youth Detention Centre in November 2018.

=== Project Acacia ===
In 2012, the TRG received Commonwealth government funding for an additional eight members as part of Project Acacia. Project Acacia was established by the NTPF to develop and maintain a response capability for incidents at immigration detention facilities in Darwin operated by the Commonwealth government Department of Immigration and Citizenship. The Commonwealth initially provided the NTPF with funding in 2012 of A$53 million over two years for ninety-four new police officers including eight TRG members. In 2014, the Commonwealth provided additional funding of A$48 million for a further two years. The NTPF established the Metropolitan Patrol Group (MPG) a full-time riot unit of sixty-one officers to respond to riots at the facilities and to assist general duties police in Darwin when not attending to incidents at the facilities. Riot response in the NTPF had been one of the roles of the TRG. In June 2016, the Commonwealth ceased providing funding to the NTPF to maintain a response capability consequently the MPG was disbanded.

== Role ==
The Territory Response Group is responsible for the following:

- Police Tactical Group: Provides a tactical response capability to deal with the containment and resolution of violent offences beyond the capability of general duties police.
- Bomb Response Unit: Responds to civilian improvised explosive or incendiary devices incidents.
- Close Personal Protection: Responsible for the co-ordination of personal protection of witnesses or dignitaries within the Northern Territory.
- Public disorder: Provides a response to demonstrations, including prison riots, and civil unrest in remote communities.
- Search and rescue: Provide land based search co-ordination and manpower at short notice.
- Counter disaster operations: Provides survey and rescue teams to provide a framework for operations in the field in conjunction with other government departments.
- Providing general frontline policing support.

Volunteers for the TRG need to successfully complete an annual one-week selection course. In 2017, three of the seven candidates passed the selection course.

== Equipment ==
In May 2011, the TRG received a Lenco BearCat armoured vehicle, known as the 'Armoured Rescue Vehicle', funded by the Commonwealth government for use in siege or terrorist situations.

In 2015, the TRG upgraded its firearms introducing the Remington R5 RGP rifle and the SIG Sauer SIG716 designated marksman rifle.

The TRG has been equipped with Tasers since 2003. General purpose dogs provide the TRG with another tactical option to resolve incidents and were first introduced into the NTPF in 2008 with the Darwin Dog Unit.

The TRG standard uniform is in A-TACS AU (Arid/Urban) camouflage. The TRG had previously replaced their uniform in 2009 with a new dark green uniform.

== Alice Springs ==
Alice Springs formerly had a part-time police unit the Immediate Response Team (IRT) trained by the TRG to enable them to cordon and contain critical incidents while awaiting the arrival of the TRG from Darwin. The IRT consisted of approximately fifteen general duties police and was equipped with AR-15 rifles, shotguns for less-than-lethal bean bag rounds, camouflage uniforms and helmets. The IRT was initially formed in 1996 as the Cordon and Containment Team, and had several names, and ultimately was renamed the Immediate Response Team in 2017. The 2000-2001 Annual Report of the Northern Territory Police, Fire and Emergency Services reported that the TRG had provided a refresher and a basic training course to the Cordon and Containment Team. In November 2019, four IRT members deployed to Yuendumu to assist the local general duties police. An IRT member during an arrest fatally shot Kumanjayi Walker. The IRT was subsequently disbanded on 31 May 2022.

The 2003 report An Assessment of Resource Requirements of the Northern Territory Police by former Queensland Police Service commissioner James O'Sullivan commissioned by the Minister for Police, Fire and Emergency Services recommended establishing a full-time six member TRG team based in Alice Springs. The team's role was to be provision of a response capability to major incidents and the provision of general frontline policing support when they were not responding to incidents or conducting training. The 2012 report A Review of Northern Territory Police Resource Allocation Efficiency and Operation Capabilities by The Consultancy Bureau commissioned by the Chief Minister reported that the recommendation had not been implemented.

== See also ==
- Tactical Assault Groups (Australian Defence Force)
- National Counter-Terrorism Exercise
- List of police tactical units
