= Mick Palmer (police commissioner) =

Australian police commissioner (born 1941)

Mick Palmer AO, APM

Commissioner of the Australian Federal Police
- In office June 1994 – 2 April 2001
- Preceded by: Peter McAulay
- Succeeded by: Mick Keelty

Chief Police Officer of ACT Policing
- In office 1995–1999
- Preceded by: Peter Dawson
- Succeeded by: William Stoll

Commissioner of Northern Territory Police
- In office 1988–1994
- Preceded by: Peter McAulay
- Succeeded by: Brian Bates

Personal details
- Born: Michael John Palmer; 1941 (age 84–85) Coventry, England
- Profession: Police officer, lawyer

Michael John Palmer, AO, APM (b. 1941) is a retired Australian police officer and lawyer who was the Commissioner of the Australian Federal Police.

== Early life ==
Mick Palmer was born in Coventry, England, in 1941. The Palmer family moved to Australia in 1953 and in 1963 Michael "Mick" Palmer joined the Northern Territory Police.

== Policing career ==
Palmer reached the position of inspector in 1975. Between 1979 and 1982 he completed his law degree then practiced at the Queensland bar. In late 1983 he returned to the NT police as chief inspector, taking the top job as police commissioner in January 1988. Palmer became AFP commissioner in June 1994 and officially retired with the swearing-in of his replacement Mick Keelty in April 2001. Mick Palmer conducted the Palmer Inquiry, an inquiry into the unlawful detention of Australian Citizen, Cornelia Rau as an illegal immigrant.

Between 2004 and 2012 he was the Federal Government's Inspector of Transport Security, a position created after the 9/11 and Bali bombing terrorist incidents to review air, sea and land transport and off-shore critical infrastructure and advise government of the efficiency and effectiveness of existing security arrangements.

== Recognition ==
Palmer is a recipient of the Australian Police Medal and in 1998 was admitted as an Officer of the Order of Australia (AO) for his work in "advancing the professionalisation of policing through the introduction of far-reaching anti-corruption processes and management practice reform."

In 1999 the Board of Governors of Charles Sturt University conferred Palmer with the award of Doctor of Letters (honoris causa) for his contribution to advancing policing in Australia.

Officer of the Order of Australia (AO)	26 January 1998, "For service to advancing the professionalisation of policing through the introduction of far-reaching anti-corruption processes and management practice reform."
Australian Police Medal (APM)	26 January 1988, "For distinguished police service".
National Medal with Rosette	1988 and 1998. For 25–34 years of service.

== See also ==
- Law enforcement in Australia

Police appointments
Preceded by Peter McAulay	Commissioner of the Australian Federal Police; 1994–2001	Succeeded by Mick Keelty
Preceded by Peter Dawson	Chief Police Officer of ACT Policing; 1995–1999	Succeeded by William Stoll
Preceded by Peter McAulay	Commissioner of the Northern Territory Police; 1988–1994	Succeeded by Brian Charles Bates
