= Marc Oberon =

English magician

Marc Oberon is an English magician, based in Nottingham.

He has won the USA People's Trophy, European Close Up Championships, the Macmillan International Award and British Ring of the International Brotherhood of Magicians.
