= Murder of William Condon =

Australian crime in 1952

The murder of William Condon was a crime that occurred in Australia in 1952. Northern Territory policeman William Condon was shot and killed in Katherine on 9 June 1952, by Terence Charles Stapleton. Stapleton was acquitted on grounds of insanity.
