= Auberon =

Auberon (French: Oberon) may refer to:

== People ==
- Auberon Herbert (1838–1906), British writer, theorist, philosopher and son of the 3rd Earl of Carnarvon
- Auberon Herbert, 9th Baron Lucas (1876–1916), British politician and fighter pilot, and grandson of the 3rd Earl of Carnarvon
- Auberon Herbert (landowner) (1922–1974), British landowner and grandson of the 4th Earl of Carnarvon
- Auberon Waugh (1939–2001), English journalist and novelist, and great-grandson of the 4th Earl of Carnarvon

== Fictional characters ==
- Auberon (comics), the King of Faerie in the DC comic series The Sandman and The Books of Magic
- "Auberon", a short story in The Expanse series
- Auberon, the king of England in G.K. Chesterton's The Napoleon of Notting Hill
