= Jamie Chalker =

Australian police commissioner

12th Commissioner of the Northern Territory Police Force (Note: Role was called: “Commissioner of Police, Fire and Emergency Services”.)
- In office 31 October 2019 – 30 April 2023
- Chief Minister: Michael Gunner; Natasha Fyles
- Preceded by: Reece Kershaw
- Succeeded by: Michael Murphy (Acting)

Assistant Commissioner of the Northern Territory Police Force
- In office 2012–2016
- Commissioner: John McRoberts; Reece Kershaw

Personal details
- Born: Katherine, Northern Territory
- Awards: Royal Human Society Bronze Medal for Bravery

Jamie Chalker APM is a former police officer and public servant in the Northern Territory of Australia. He served as Commissioner of the Northern Territory Police Force from November 2019 to April 2023, when he resigned under pressure, seven months before his contract was due to expire.

== Career ==
Chalker was born in Katherine, Northern Territory and spent much of his early life in Alice Springs. He began his career in the Northern Territory Police Force in 1994, where he remained served in various roles, much of the time in remote localities. In 2012 he was appointed Assistant Commissioner, with several stints as deputy commissioner and acting commissioner. In 2016 he was appointed chief executive officer of the Department of Local Government, Housing and Community Development. This was around the time Police Commissioner John McRoberts was charged with, and later convicted of, attempting to pervert the course of justice in a travel agent investigation. Chalker, who had been Officer in Charge, Darwin Police Station, was his recently appointed chief of staff.

Chalker was appointed commissioner in April 2019, succeeding Reece Kershaw APM (and Acting Commissioner Michael Murphy APM), with his contract due to expire in November 2023.

Following media reports that the NT government had asked him to resign, Chalker launched legal action against Chief Minister Natasha Fyles, Police Minister Kate Worden and the NT government in a bid to prevent his dismissal. On 14 April his legal representatives filed a motion in the Northern Territory Supreme Court, requesting the court to order Fyles to provide details about "allegations made by her" in a letter sent to Chalker in late March. Chalker asked the court to be given an opportunity to respond to Fyles' allegations before any steps were taken to revoke his appointment as police commissioner.

On 29 April, in a joint press release from the NT Government and Chalker, his retirement, to take effect on 30 April 2023, was announced, avoiding a Supreme Court action which would have seen Fyles and Worden cross-examined in court. No details of any financial settlement or other conditions were released.

== Awards ==
In 1999, Commissioner Chalker was awarded a Royal Humane Society Bronze Medal for Bravery for entering flood waters and rescuing a man who had been swept down-river in Wattie Creek, near Daguragu, Northern Territory.

He holds the Australian Police Medal and has a number of career highlights through his investigations into homicide, serious drug and organised crime.

== See also ==
- Ray Whitrod, Queensland police commissioner sacked by Bjelke-Petersen government
- Harold Salisbury, South Australian police commissioner sacked by Dunstan government
