= Australian Federal Police =

Law enforcement agency

- Badge

- Flag
- Abbreviation: AFP

Agency overview
- Formed: 1979; 47 years ago
- Preceding agencies: Commonwealth Police; Australian Capital Territory Police; Australian Protective Service; Federal Bureau of Narcotics
- Employees: 8,082 (2024) (Note: Includes ongoing and non-ongoing employees for the year to 30 June 2024.)
- Volunteers: Small numbers for non-operation-related activity.
- Annual budget: A$2.3 billion (2025–2026)
- Legal personality: Police force

Jurisdictional structure
- Federal agency: Australia
- Operations jurisdiction: Australia
- Governing body: Australian Government
- Constituting instrument: Australian Federal Police Act 1979 (Cth)
- General nature: Federal law enforcement; Civilian police

Operational structure
- Headquarters: Edmund Barton Building, Canberra
- Minister responsible: Tony Burke, Minister for Home Affairs
- Agency executive: Krissy Barrett, Commissioner
- Functions: 11: Counter Terrorism; Protection Operations; Organised Crime and Cyber; Crime Operations; International Operations; Border Investigations; Technology and Innovation; Specialist Operations; Support Capability; Australian Institute of Police Management; ACT Policing
- Offices: 9: Adelaide Office; Brisbane Office; Darwin Office; Hobart Office; Melbourne Office; Perth Office; Sydney Office; Cairns Office; Winchester Centre, ACT

Website
- www.afp.gov.au
- The Australian Federal Police, while a federal agency, provides policing to dependent Australian (on and offshore) Commonwealth Territories.

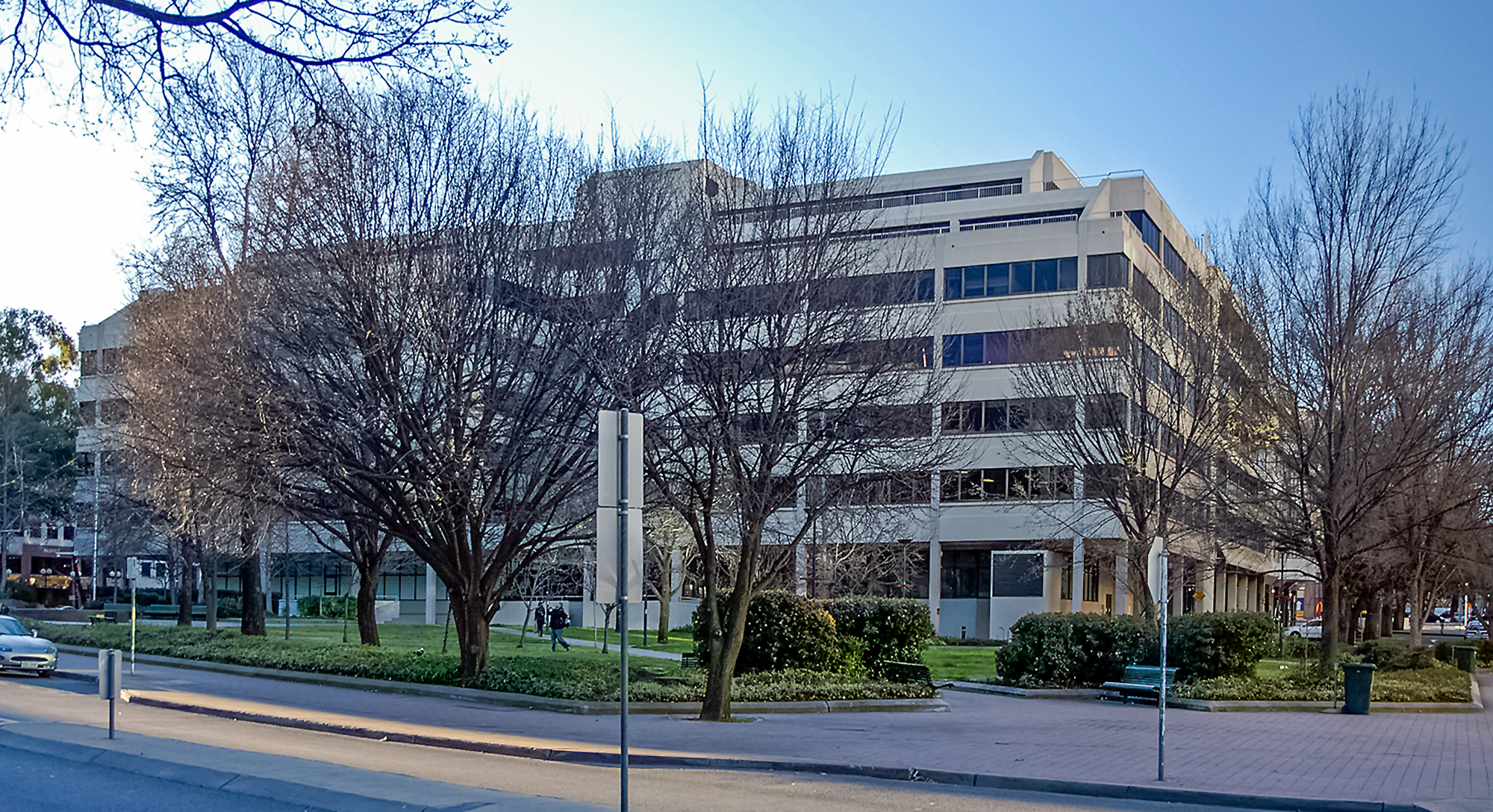
Former Australian Federal Police headquarters

The Australian Federal Police (AFP) is the national and principal federal law enforcement agency of the Australian Government, responsible for investigating crime and protecting the national security of the Commonwealth of Australia. The AFP is an agency of the Department of Home Affairs and is responsible to the Minister for Home Affairs. Since October 2025, the Commissioner of the Australian Federal Police is Krissy Barrett.

The AFP has a focus on preventing, investigating and disrupting transnational, serious, complex, and organised crime, including terrorism and violent extremism, cybercrime, child exploitation, drug smuggling, and human trafficking. The AFP is also responsible for delivering community policing in the Australian Capital Territory through ACT Policing, and to other dependent territories, providing protective security in major airports, and close protection for dignitaries. The AFP also contributes to United Nations peacekeeping around the world. It is a member of the National Intelligence Community and works closely with the Australian Security Intelligence Organisation (ASIO), the Australian Border Force, and the Australian Criminal Intelligence Commission.

== History ==
The Australian Federal Police was formed on 19 October 1979 under the Australian Federal Police Act 1979. after the merging of the former Commonwealth Police and the Australian Capital Territory Police. This followed a review of Australia's anti-terrorism capacity by Sir Robert Mark, former commissioner of the Metropolitan Police in the UK, which was commissioned by the Fraser government following the 1978 Hilton bombing. In November 1979, the Federal Narcotics Bureau was transferred to the new agency. In 1984, the protective service component of the AFP was separated, forming the Australian Protective Service (APS) under the administrative service and later governed by Attorney-General's Department. APS was transferred back to the AFP in 2004.

== Governance and oversight ==
The AFP is an independent agency of the Department of Home Affairs and is responsible to the Minister for Home Affairs and accountable to the Parliament of Australia.

The Parliamentary Joint Committee on Law Enforcement, a joint committee of members of the Australian House and Senate, has responsibility for oversight of the AFP and the Australian Crime Commission. Separately, the National Anti-Corruption Commission (NACC) is charged with investigating systemic corruption in the AFP and other commonwealth agencies.

== Functions and roles ==
The AFP's role is to enforce Australian criminal law, contribute to combating complex, transnational, serious and organised crime impacting Australia's national security, and to protect Commonwealth interests from criminal activity in Australia and overseas. Key priorities of the AFP are set by the Attorney-General, through a ministerial direction issued under the Australian Federal Police Act 1979.

The AFP has a focus on preventing, investigating and disrupting transnational, serious, complex and organised crime including terrorism and violent extremism, cybercrime, child exploitation, drug smuggling, and human trafficking. The AFP is also responsible for delivering community policing in the Australian Capital Territory through ACT Policing and to other dependent territories, providing protective security in major airports and close protection for dignitaries including the prime minister of Australia and foreign diplomatic missions, delivering law enforcement training for Asia-Pacific partner agencies, acting as Australia's international law enforcement and policing representative, and contributing to United Nations peacekeeping around the world. The AFP is also a member of the National Intelligence Community and works closely with the Australian Security Intelligence Organisation, the Australian Border Force, and the Australian Criminal Intelligence Commission.

Areas of operational emphasis include:

- investigating complex, transnational, serious, and organised crime
- protecting Australians and Australian interests from terrorism and violent extremism
- representing Australian police and law enforcement on an international level
- developing unique capabilities and exploiting advanced technology to support Australia's national interests.

Continued responsibilities include providing:

- community policing services under contracted arrangement, to the Australian Capital Territory and territories of Christmas Island, Cocos (Keeling) Islands, Norfolk Island and Jervis Bay Territory.
- a national protection capability to ensure the protection of specific individuals, establishments, and events identified by the Australian Government as being at risk.
- a national counter-terrorism first response capability focused on aviation security and protection of critical infrastructure.

=== National operations ===
Federal agents are based in each Australian state and territory, internationally, and form the largest component of the AFP staff. Federal agents chiefly perform criminal investigative duties.

Current areas of focus for the AFP:

- Illicit drug trafficking
- People smuggling;
- Human trafficking, including slavery and human exploitation;
- Serious major fraud against the government
- High-tech crime involving information technology and communications
- Prevention, countering, and investigation of terrorism
- Transnational and multi-jurisdictional crime
- Money laundering
- Organised crime
- Cyber crime

The AFP hosts a National Missing Persons Coordination Unit, and the Australian Interpol National Central Bureau.

=== Australian Capital Territory and other territories ===
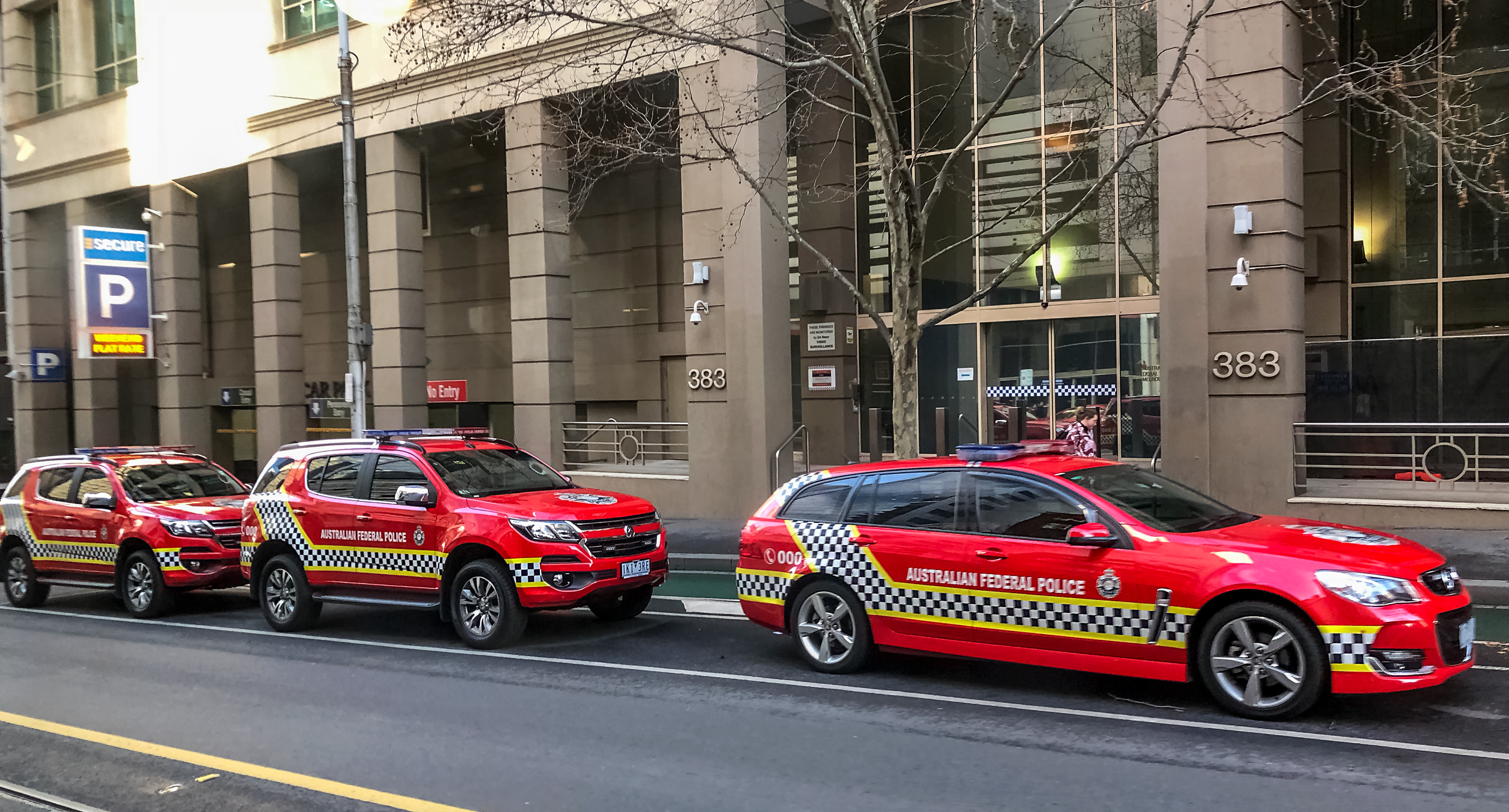
AFP vehicles in Melbourne

In addition to its federal role, the AFP provides policing services to the Australian Capital Territory and the external territories, including Christmas Island, Cocos (Keeling) Islands, Norfolk Island, and Jervis Bay Territory.

=== Specialist Protective Command ===
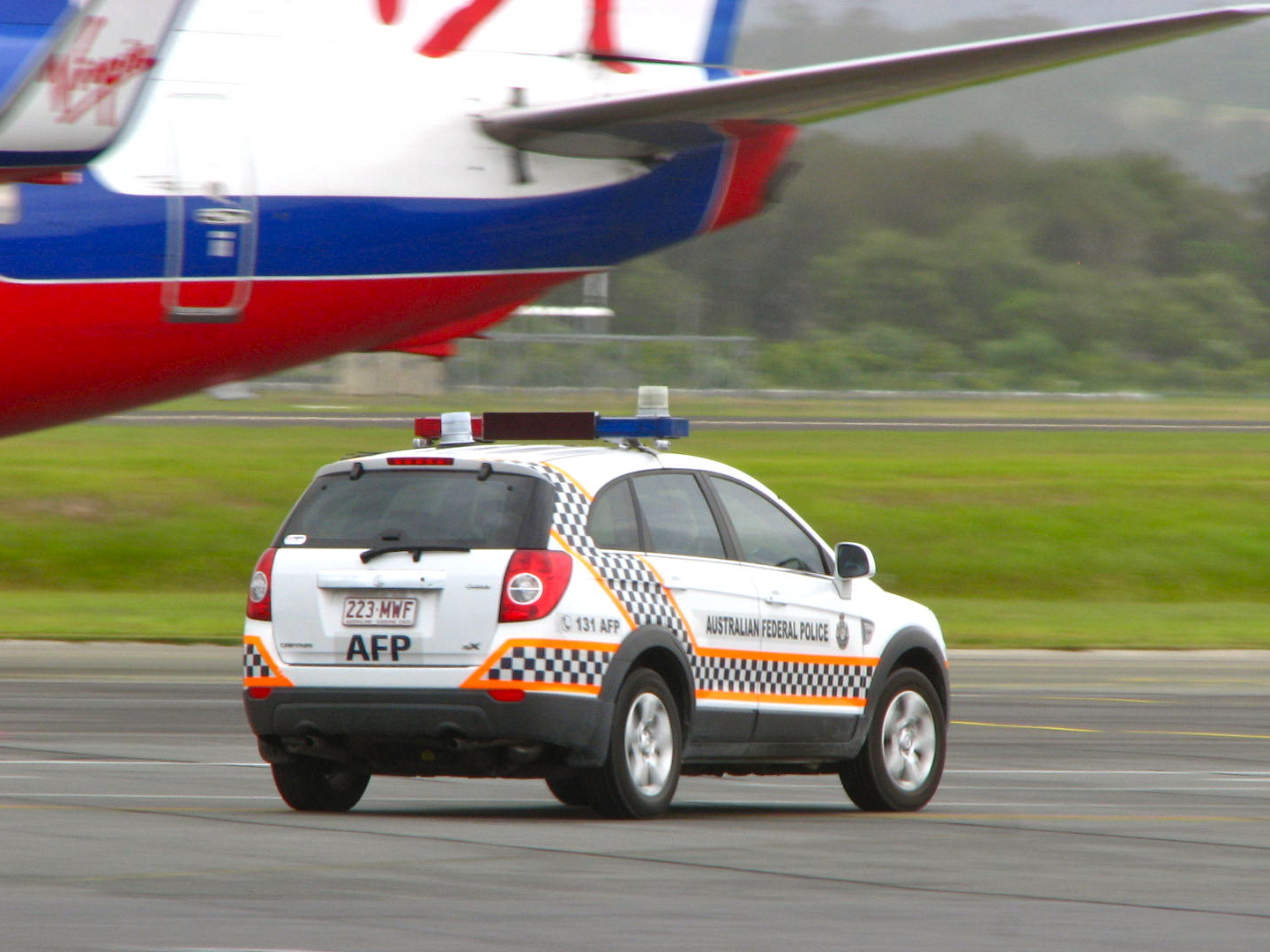
An AFP vehicle on duty at Gold Coast Airport in Queensland

The AFP Specialist Protective Command provides physical protection for the Australian government at key locations throughout Australia and internationally. Uniform protection officers (identified as Protective Service Officers or PSOs) are firearms and defensive tactics trained, and perform duties which include armed escorts, bomb appraisals, bomb detection canines, visitor control, static guarding, alarm monitoring and response, mobile, foot, and bicycle patrols, maintain civil order, security consultancy services, counter-terrorism first response at many Commonwealth establishments. Protective Service Officers have powers under Section 14 of the AFP Act 1979 to stop, request identification, search, and arrest within their jurisdiction. Uniform protection officers undertake an essential role in protecting Australia's critical infrastructure and assist in providing protection for Australian high office holders, diplomatic, consular personnel, and other foreign nationals.

Specialist Protective Command officers providing an armed uniform capability are located at federal establishments including Parliament House in Canberra; the residences of the prime minister and governor-general; foreign embassies and consulates in Canberra, Sydney, Melbourne and Perth; the Australian Nuclear Science and Technology Organisation, joint defence facilities such as the Australian Defence Force Headquarters in Canberra, Holsworthy Barracks, Garden Island Naval Base, Victoria Barracks, the Pine Gap US defence installation, and sensitive covert locations in Australia and internationally.

Aviation Uniform Police (AUP) are the primary law enforcement agency responsible for aviation security at the nine major Australian airports; Sydney, Canberra, Melbourne, Adelaide, Brisbane, Darwin, Cairns, Gold Coast and Perth. On 6 December 2019 the AFP announced that the Protective Operations Response Team (PORT) members located at the nine designated Australian airports will carry the Daniel Defense Mk.18 Short Barreled Rifle. The increase in AFP aviation protection capability was part of the Aviation Security Enhancement Program (ASEP), the short barreled firearms specifically for the purpose of delivering a Counter Terrorist First Response (CTFR) role.

=== International peacekeeping ===
Since its inception, the AFP has had a long tradition of involvement in international peacekeeping, policing, and capacity development. International Deployment Group (IDG) is an AFP portfolio that has increased rapidly in a short time since its inception in 2004. Since 1964, Australia has contributed police officers to the United Nations Peacekeeping Force in Cyprus. AFP officers have also previously served with the United Nations in East Timor (Timor-Leste) and South Sudan.

In recent years, Australian government efforts to assist neighbouring and remote countries with institutional capacity building has led to AFP deployments to Papua New Guinea, the Solomon Islands (Under the Regional Assistance Mission to Solomon Islands), Timor-Leste (Under the Timor-Leste Police Development Program TLPDP), Nauru, Tonga, Vanuatu, Afghanistan, and Samoa. Previous peacekeeping missions have included Haiti, Mozambique, Thailand, Namibia, and Somalia. IDG uses the Specialist Response Group for particular medium and high-risk planned operations or emergency incidents in addition to assisting with capacity building and force protection operations.

=== Ceremonial and protocol ===
The AFP Ceremonial and Protocol Team conducts and participates in a variety of police and community functions and ceremonies.

Ceremonial events include the annual National Police Remembrance Day Service at the National Police Memorial in Canberra on 29 September, medal presentations, parades, police funerals, memorial services, official opening of police stations and policing facilities, AFP pipes and drums concerts, inauguration events, and public relations events. The Ceremonial Team coordinates the AFP Ceremonial and Protocol Officer (CAPO) Network and the AFP Pipes and Drums to perform ceremonial duties at these functions and ceremonies.

Formerly, the Ceremonial team also included the AFP Ceremonial Mounted Cadre. The AFP Ceremonial Mounted Cadre was raised on 29 September 2006 at the dedication of the National Police Memorial. The ceremonial uniform links to former mounted policing units of the AFP's predecessor organisations, namely the Commonwealth Police and the Peace Officer guard, as well as to mounted policing units from the NSW Police Force that patrolled the geographic area of the ACT. The Mounted Cadre was disbanded shortly after their final appearance at the opening of the AFP's new Headquarters in Barton on 7 April 2011. The AFP Ceremonial and Protocol team currently provides drill instructor accreditation for both the AFP and the NSW Police Force, and ceremonial and protocol officer accreditation for all of Australia's policing jurisdictions.

=== International liaison ===
The AFP has an international network to assist with inquiries and liaise with police agencies around the world. The AFP represents Australian state/territory police agencies internationally. AFP's International Liaison Officer Network has 85 AFP appointees in almost 40 countries around the world. AFP International Liaison Officers are the Australian Government's law enforcement representatives overseas.

== Structure ==
=== Joint Counter-Terrorism Teams ===
The Joint Counter Terrorism Teams (JCTTs) in each state and territory jurisdiction consist of AFP, state and territory police, and Australian Security Intelligence Organisation officers. JCTTs conduct investigations to prevent and disrupt terrorism and violent extremism. The JCTT model can be seen as the Australian version of the United States' Joint Terrorism Task Force, Canada's Integrated National Security Enforcement Teams and the United Kingdom's National Counter Terrorism Policing Network.

The National Disruption Group (NDG) is an AFP-led interagency team that consolidates the capabilities of participating agencies to prevent, disrupt, and prosecute Australian nationals who travel or intend to travel offshore to engage in hostilities and/or undertake terrorism training and support to terrorist entities. The NDG brings together the AFP and its partner agencies to coordinate operational disruption activities nationally and internationally to counter the enduring threat posed by foreign fighters.

=== Australian Federal Police College ===
The Australian Federal Police College in Barton, A.C.T. is the main training facility for the force. As of 2026 the college offers nine nationally recognised qualifications: Some courses for Protective Services Officers take place in Pinkenba, Brisbane.

=== Counter Terrorism Online Centre ===
In May 2026, a new unit called the Counter Terrorism Online Centre (CTOC) was announced by AFP Commissioner Krissy Barrett and the Minister for Home Affairs, Tony Burke, after A$76m had been allocated for it in the government's budget. CTOC opened in Sydney in November 2026. Run jointly by the AFP and the Australian Security Intelligence Organisation (ASIO), its aim is to identify at-risk youth online, and to prevent radicalisation and grooming that leads to acts of terrorism. The centre will employ both human investigators and AI tools to improve threat detection. Using specialist intelligence analystss, counter-terrorism investigators, and covert capabilities from both agencies, ASIO and the AFP are more easily able to share intelligence and coordinate their responses to possible threats.

== Commissioners ==
The highest-ranked AFP officer is the commissioner, appointed under Section 17 of the Australian Federal Police Act 1979.

Commissioner of Australian Federal Police
- Incumbent; Krissy Barrett since 4 October 2025
- Department of Home Affairs
- Reports to: Minister for Home Affairs
- Residence: Canberra, Australian Capital Territory
- Seat: Edmund Barton Building
- Nominator: Minister for Home Affairs
- Appointer: Governor-General
- Term length: 7 years, renewable at the Governor-General's pleasure.
- Constituting instrument: Australian Federal Police Act 1979
- Precursor: Commissioner of the Commonwealth Police
- Inaugural holder: Colin Woods
- Formation: 1 August 1979
- Salary: A$720,480

Rank	Name	Post-nominals	Term began	Term ended	Time in appointment
Commissioner of the AFP
Commissioner	Sir Colin Woods	KCVO, CBE, QPM	1 August 1979	1 January 1982	2 years, 74 days
Commissioner (Major General)	Ronald Grey	AO, DSO	1 January 1982	30 November 1988	6 years, 334 days
Commissioner	Peter McAulay	AO, QPM	30 November 1988	1 June 1994	5 years, 183 days
Commissioner	Michael Palmer	AO, APM	1 June 1994	2 April 2001	6 years, 335 days
Commissioner	Mick Keelty	AO, APM	2 April 2001	2 September 2009	8 years, 123 days
Commissioner	Tony Negus	APM	7 September 2009	30 September 2014	5 years, 23 days
Commissioner	Andrew Colvin	APM, OAM	30 September 2014	1 October 2019	5 years, 0 days
Commissioner	Reece Kershaw	APM	2 October 2019	3 October 2025	6 years, 1 day
Commissioner	Krissy Barrett	APM	4 October 2025	Incumbent	1 year, 49 days

== Ranks ==
All sworn AFP members hold policing ranks whilst national sworn members are also known to use the title Federal Agent. Where applicable, qualified members are also entitled to use the Detective designation.

AFP Commissioner's Order 1 (Administration) states that every AFP Member holds a rank (as detailed below), with the corresponding title and role adopted.

Uniform and Community Policing Rank/Title	Broadband Rank	Role	National Operations Title
Constable	Constable	Team Member	Team Member, Federal Agent
First Class Constable	Constable	Team Member	Team Member, Federal Agent
Senior Constable	Constable	Team Member	Team Member, Federal Agent
Leading Senior Constable	Constable	Team Member	Team Member, Federal Agent
Sergeant	Sergeant	Team Leader	Team Leader, Federal Agent
Inspector	Inspector	Officer In Charge	Officer In Charge, Federal Agent
Superintendent	Superintendent	Coordinator	Coordinator, Federal Agent
Commander	Commander	Manager	Manager, Commander
Assistant Commissioner	Assistant Commissioner	National Manager	National Manager, Assistant Commissioner
Deputy Commissioner	Deputy Commissioner	Deputy Commissioner	Deputy Commissioner
Commissioner	Commissioner	Commissioner	Commissioner

First Class Constable is a reflection of four years of service. Senior Constable has a minimum of six years of service. Leading Senior Constable is a reflection of at least 12–15 years of service. From there, promotion to Sergeant, etc., is by application/merit and so on.

== Criticism ==
=== Bali Nine ===
The AFP was contacted by a member of the Bali Nine drug courier gang's father, and they said they would keep a watch on him. They could not stop them from travelling to Indonesia to smuggle drugs. Instead, they contacted the Indonesian police, which led to their arrest in Indonesia rather than when returning to Australia. The leaders of the gang, Andrew Chan and Myuran Sukumaran, were executed on 29 April 2015. The others were released from prison after 19 years and returned to Australia in December 2024.

=== Raids on media ===
On 4 June 2019, the AFP conducted a raid on the home of News Corp journalist Annika Smethurst, looking for information connected to a story she had written a few years earlier about new laws that would give the security forces new powers for surveillance over Australian citizens. Radio host Ben Fordham also claimed that he was under investigation for some of his reporting. The next day the police raided the Australian Broadcasting Corporation (ABC) over a story about alleged war crimes in Afghanistan. The search warrant allowed the police to "add, copy, delete or alter" any files they found on the computers.

The incidents caused an outcry of condemnation from international media outlets, including the BBC and The New York Times. On 15 April 2020, the High Court of Australia ruled that the warrant used in the Smethurst raid was invalid.

=== Lehrmann rape trial ===
The AFP withheld evidence provided by ACT Policing investigators to ACT prosecutors in 2021 Australian Parliament House sexual misconduct allegations to an inquiry into the handling of the matter due to laws preventing the agency from disclosing certain information. The inquiry was created in the wake of accusations of mishandling made by both the ACT's Director of Public Prosecutions, Shane Drumgold, and the AFP against each other.

=== Members' pay and conditions ===
In 2019, the AFP changed the rules around how firearms are checked out, after a series of suicides in their offices. The changes were criticised by the Australian Federal Police Association (AFPA) as a quick fix.

In 2022, Independent federal senator David Pocock said that the AFP should be better paid, as they were among the lowest paid of the various Australian police forces; some members were being forced to work a second job. In October 2023, the AFPA launched a campaign for wage rises of up to 20 per cent over three years. saying that many officers were leaving to move to other policing agencies. On 2 December 2024 a new enterprise agreement commenced, setting the pay for AFP national police, ACT Policing, and Protective Service Officers from 2024 to 2027, approved by the Fair Work Commission.

== In popular culture ==
The AFP has appeared in several fictional television series and documentaries. It was the focus of a documentary series called AFP, which followed AFP operations and training in Australia and internationally. AFP members have also appeared in other documentary series such as Border Security: Australia's Front Line and the Keeping Australia Safe miniseries. They are also portrayed in the true crime drama series Underbelly and in the military action series NCIS: Sydney, along with the United States NCIS.

== See also ==
- AFP (TV series)
- Australian Federal Police Association
- Australian police ranks
- Specialist Protective Services (AFP's Police Tactical Group)
- Terrorism in Australia
