= Richard Carter (actor) =

Australian actor (1953–2019)

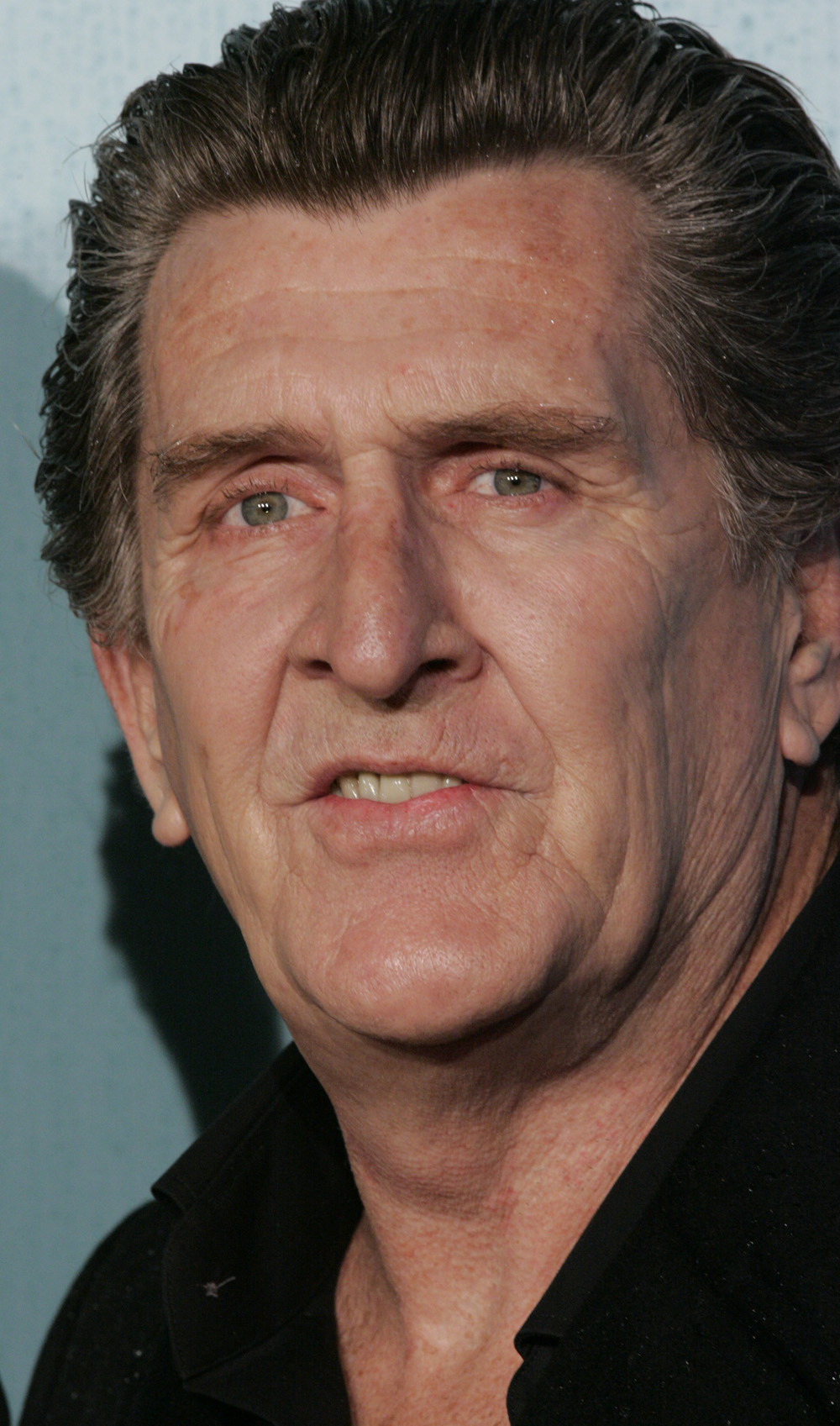
- Carter in Sydney, Australia in 2013
- Born: 11 December 1953; Sydney, New South Wales, Australia
- Died: 13 July 2019 (aged 65); Sydney, Australia
- Occupation: Actor
- Years active: 1981–2019
- Spouse: Lindsey Carter (m. 1991)
- Children: 1

Richard Carter (11 December 1953 – 13 July 2019) was an Australian actor and stand-up comedian who appeared in several television series and independent films.

== Early life ==
Richard Carter was born on 11 December 1953.

== Career ==
Carter was a Sydney Comedy Store regular who branched into acting, playing iconic roles in television and film, beginning in the early 1980s.

Some of Carter's filmography includes Babe: Pig in the City (1998), Our Lips Are Sealed (2000) with Mary-Kate and Ashley Olsen), Bootmen (2000), The Man Who Sued God (2001), Rabbit-Proof Fence (2002), crime drama Gettin' Square (2003), Hating Alison Ashley (2005) and Baz Luhrmann epic The Great Gatsby (2013). His final role was as the Bullet Farmer in George Miller epic Mad Max: Fury Road.

His regular television roles included playing Mick Corella in Rake, Mick Deakin in East West 101 and Ted Hudson in White Collar Blue. He also appeared in Wildside, Rafferty's Rules, A Country Practice and Police Rescue, as well as Kennedy Miller miniseries Bangkok Hilton alongside Nicole Kidman.

Carter also played the role of real life killer, Bradley John Murdoch in the 2007 Australian telemovie Joanne Lees: Murder in the Outback, depicting the events surrounding the murder of British backpacker Peter Falconio and the attempted murder of his girlfriend, Joanne Lees.

He also performed voiceover work, lending his voice to 2006 animated family film Happy Feet and its 2011 sequel Happy Feet 2 as well as television commercials for Victoria Bitter and Toyota.

== Death ==
Carter died in the early hours of 13 July 2019, in Sydney, Australia after a brief illness. He was survived by his wife Lindsey and daughter Amy.

== Filmography ==
=== Film ===
Year	Title	Role	Notes
1983	Hostage	Sleazy Carnival Customer (uncredited)	Feature film
1983	Undercover	Country Heckler	Feature film
1984	Fast Talking	Geography teacher	Feature film
1985	Emoh Ruo	Thommo	Feature film
1985	Rebel	Harry De Wheels	Feature film
1986	Spearfield's Daughter	2nd IRA Man	TV film
1987	Howling III	First Drunk	Feature film
1987	Outback Vampires	Stinger	Feature film
1988	Belinda	Bus Conductor	Feature film
1988	Around the World in 80 Ways	Financier	Feature film
1988	The Clean Machine	D.S. Frank Truro	Feature film
1988	Grievous Bodily Harm	Les	Feature film
1989	The Punisher	Cop	Feature film
1990	Sher Mountain Killings Mystery	Conrad	Feature film
1990	Father		Feature film
1992	Exchange Lifeguards	Al Eastman	Feature film
1993	Reckless Kelly	Police Sergeant	Feature film
1994	No Escape	Sleeping Sentry	Feature film
1994	Muriel's Wedding	Federal Policeman	Feature film
1994	Signal One	Frankie Button	Feature film
1995	On the Dead Side		Feature film
1996	Idiot Box	Big Bloke	Feature film
1997	Paws	Cafe Owner	Feature film
1998	Babe: Pig in the City	Detective (uncredited)	Feature film
1999	Two Hands	2NAX DJ	Feature film
1999	Dogwatch	Klipper	Feature film
2000	Bootmen	Gary Okden	Feature film
2000	Our Lips Are Sealed	Sidney	Feature film
2001	My Husband My Killer	Mike Hagan	TV movie
2001	The Man Who Sued God	Dirk Streicher	Feature film
2002	Rabbit-Proof Fence	Farmhouse Policeman	Feature film
2002	Heroes' Mountain	Police Inspector	TV movie
2003	You Can't Stop the Murders	Chief Carter	Feature film
2003	Gettin' Square	Craig 'Crusher' Knobes	Feature film
2005	Hating Alison Ashley	Lennie Grubb	Feature film
2007	Murder in the Outback	Bradley Murdoch	TV movie
2011	Happy Feet Two	Bryan the Beach Master (voice)	Feature film
2013	The Great Gatsby	Herzog	Feature film
2015	Mad Max: Fury Road	The Bullet Farmer	Feature film (final role)

=== Television ===
Year	Title	Role	Notes
1983	Sons and Daughters	Jim / Keith	2 episodes
1984	Bodyline	Voce	1 episode
1986–1993	A Country Practice	Big Jules / Detective Branco / Turf Cutter	8 episodes
1987	Vietnam	Policeman	2 episodes
1987–1991	Rafferty's Rules	Detective Sgt. Brown	21 episodes
1989	Bangkok Hilton	Detective King	Miniseries, 3 episodes
1990	The Flying Doctors	Doug Holland	Season 6, episode 12: Dead Reckoning
1991	Police Rescue	Vic Wilson	Season 1, episode 8: Raid
1992	Hey Dad..!	Policeman	Season 8, episode 12: Arthur McArthur, P.I.
1994	Heartland	Merv	1 episode
1994	The Ferals	Brimley Snod	Season 1, episode 15: Seasons Greedings
1994–1996	G.P.	Arthur Connolly / Commander	3 episodes
1995	Blue Murder	Lyail Chandler	TV miniseries, 2 episodes
1997	Twisted Tales	Jim Nicholson	Season 1, episode 11: Borrowing Bazza
1997	Fallen Angels	Craig Douglas	5 episodes
1997–1999	Wildside	Brian Deakin	5 episodes
1999	All Saints	Alistair Walsh	Season 2, episode 33: True Love and the Blues
1999	Water Rats	Victor Wise	Season 4, episode 25: Shark Bait
2000	The Corner	Crime Scene Officer	Season 1, episode 6: Everyman's Blues
2000–2003	Pizza	Detective / Bad Cop / Dad Stanko	4 episodes
2001	The Bill	Keith Drury	Season 17, episode 59: Beech on the Run
2001	Blue Heelers	Les Anderson	4 episodes
2001	Farscape	Ullom / Kabaah	2 episodes
2002–2003	White Collar Blue	Ted Hudson	44 episodes
2006–2008	Stupid, Stupid Man	FA / JA	2 episodes
2007	City Homicide	Larry Klein	2 episodes
2008–2011	East West 101	Mick Deakin	5 episodes
2010–2014	Rake	Mick Corella	5 episodes
2013	Housos	Narrator	Season 2, episode 1: Voucher
