= Joanne Lees: Murder in the Outback =

2007 Australian TV film

- ITV promotional trailer
- Genre: fiction
- Written by: Kate Brooke
- Directed by: Tony Tilse
- Starring: Joanne Froggatt; John Wood; Laurence Breuls
- Theme music composer: Guy Gross
- Countries of origin: Australia; United Kingdom
- Original language: English

Production
- Producers: Spencer Campbell; Matt Carroll
- Editor: Martin Connor
- Running time: 94 minutes (120 minutes including advertisements)

Original release
- Network: Network Ten
- Release: 18 March 2007
- Network: ITV1
- Release: 8 April 2007

Joanne Lees: Murder in the Outback (also known as Murder in the Outback) is a television film produced by Channel Ten and ITV Productions, which first aired in Australia on Channel Ten on 18 March 2007 and in the UK on ITV on Sunday 8 April, where it was titled Murder in the Outback. It is based on the real life disappearance of Peter Falconio.

== Synopsis ==
The film begins in 2001, when backpackers Joanne Lees and Peter Falconio were travelling around the outback in Australia in a camper van. On the Stuart Highway, near Barrow Creek, in the Northern Territory, they were waved down by Bradley John Murdoch, who was later convicted of assaulting Lees and murdering Falconio.

The opening scene is Bondi Beach in Sydney. The backpackers climb into their Kombi van and embark upon their journey into the outback. When driving on the Stuart Highway north of Alice Springs late one night, they are flagged down by a bearded man driving a ute. Falconio disappears around the back of the Kombi with the man, and tells Lees to rev the engine. She does so, and a gunshot can be heard. Lees cries out for Falconio, but he does not answer back, and he is not seen again after this point. The bearded man then appears at the front of the vehicle brandishing a gun, and attempts to kidnap Lees, tying her up in the process. Managing to escape from capture, she hides in nearby bushes.

After four hours of hiding she is finally rescued by a driver of a road train, who takes Lees to a hotel, where the police are called. Immediately, the press from the UK and Australia began gaining interest in the case, throwing doubt onto Lees' story and focusing on intense rumours that she murdered Falconio. Later, however, Bradley Murdoch is arrested and charged with Falconio's murder after Lees identifies him as the bearded man who kidnapped her.

Lees then faces Murdoch at a committal hearing, and undergoes tough questioning about her version of events and her relationship with Falconio. She is questioned at length about Nick Riley, a man with whom she was having sex without Falconio's knowledge, and to whom she continued sending e-mails even after Falconio disappeared. Eventually, however, it is decided that there is enough evidence to charge Murdoch and bring the case to trial.

Lees, unwilling at first, attends the trial and gives evidence. She demonstrates to the jury how she was able to manoeuvre her bound hands from behind her back to in front of her body, a key part of her account of her capture. Substantial DNA evidence against Murdoch is also revealed. The jury give a unanimous decision, finding Murdoch guilty of the murder of Falconio. The judge calls him a "Cold blooded killer, who's shown no remorse." He is sentenced to 28 years in prison before being eligible for parole. The film ends with a scene of Lees sitting on the beach, and text on the screen displays simply: "Peter Falconio's body is still missing".

== Cast ==
- Joanne Froggatt as Joanne Lees
- John Wood as Grant Algie
- Bryan Brown as Rex Wild
- Tom Long as Tony Elliot
- Asher Keddie as Anne Barnett
- Richard Carter as Bradley John Murdoch
- Laurence Breuls as Peter Falconio
- Damian de Montemas as PC Bantan
- Russell Kiefel as Kesby
- Mel James as the Clerk of the Court
- Toby Leonard Moore as Paul Falconio
- Denise Roberts as Helen Jones
- Gary Waddell as Vince
