= Joanne Lees =

British writer

- Born: Joanne Rachael Lees; 25 September 1973 (age 53); Huddersfield, West Riding of Yorkshire, England
- Occupation: Social worker
- Known for: Victim of attempted kidnapping subsequent to the murder of her partner
- Notable work: No Turning Back
- Television: Joanne Lees: Murder in the Outback
- Partner(s): Peter Falconio (1996–2001; his death)

Joanne Rachael Lees (born 25 September 1973) is a British woman who was attacked and subjected to an attempted abduction while travelling in Australia with her partner Peter Falconio. Lees escaped her attacker, but Falconio was never found. The attacker was identified as Bradley John Murdoch, and in 2005 he was convicted of Falconio's murder. Lees was the chief crown witness in the murder trial, which was conducted in Darwin. She later wrote a book about her experiences, which was made into a television film.

== Early life ==
Lees was born on 25 September 1973 to an English mother and Australian father, and lived her first 11 years with her mother Jenny (who had separated from her father). Her mother then remarried Vincent, who already had a son named Sam, and the new family of four lived in Huddersfield, Yorkshire, England. During high school and later studies, she had several part-time jobs as a barmaid, and bacon packer, before securing a job at her local Thomas Cook travel agency.

Lees first met Falconio in a nightclub in Huddersfield in 1996 and began living with him the following year in Brighton, England where Falconio was studying at Brighton University. She then transferred her job to a local Thomas Cook agency, before the couple took short trips to Italy, Greece, and Jamaica. From 1998, the couple had planned a trip to Thailand, Singapore, and Australia (though recent news of the backpacker murders, Port Arthur killings, and Childers Palace Backpackers Hostel fire there had made their families anxious). On 15 November 2000, the couple departed, travelling through Nepal, Singapore, Malaysia, Thailand, and Cambodia (where Lees' traveller's cheques and return ticket were stolen).

By 16 January 2001, they arrived in Sydney on a working holiday visa, and Lees then job-hunted, finally securing work at the Dymocks bookstore on George Street. After five months, in which the couple had enjoyed Sydney's nightclub scene, Falconio purchased a car for the next stage of their travel plan, a road trip from Sydney to Melbourne, Adelaide, Darwin, and Brisbane.

== Falconio murder ==
Falconio and Lees were travelling at night along the Stuart Highway near Barrow Creek (between Alice Springs and Tennant Creek) in the Northern Territory, outback Australia, on 14 July 2001, when a man in another vehicle flagged them down, and told them that he had noticed that their camper van had engine trouble. After Falconio went to the rear of the vehicle with the man to investigate, Lees heard a shot. The man then threatened Lees with a gun, and tied her up, but she escaped while he was distracted (apparently while moving Falconio's body). She hid for five hours in nearby bushes before running out onto the road and flagging down a truck driver who took her to safety.

In the aftermath of the attack, Lees was both supported and suspected by the media (as had happened in the Chamberlain case). Expert testimony presented at the trial indicated that Bradley Murdoch was the man captured in the CCTV footage at the service station. Lees identified Murdoch from police photographs shown to her in November 2002 by Northern Territory Police and finally face-to-face during the trial on 18 October 2005. This, combined with the DNA match on Lees' T-shirt, formed the case for Murdoch being charged with the murder. DNA testing procedure and this DNA result greatly assisted in the conviction of Murdoch. Murdoch was found guilty by a jury in a unanimous verdict and sentenced to life in prison. He died in July 2025 without ever revealing the whereabouts of Falconio's remains.

== Media coverage ==
In March 2002, Lees agreed to an interview for Granada TV with Martin Bashir, which was later televised in Australia, for which she was paid £50,000. She later testified in court that she had agreed to this interview to raise awareness of the case in Australia, as she felt the public profile of the case had diminished.

Lees wrote No Turning Back, a book about her life. She went to the UK for the launch of the book in October 2006 and a serialisation appeared in The Times newspaper on 2 and 3 October. A lengthy interview with Lees was aired on Andrew Denton's show, Enough Rope on 9 October 2006. The same day, Lees was interviewed on the Today programme on BBC Radio 4 by John Humphrys. On 10 October 2006, Lees was interviewed by BBC News 24.

In July 2011, Lees was interviewed by Australia's Woman's Day in the lead-up to the tenth anniversary of the murder of Peter Falconio. She stated that she was still single and living a solitary life, and had worked at a travel agency and as a social worker with disabled people. She had also studied sociology at Sheffield University.

On 12 February 2017, Australia's Nine Network presented a 60 Minutes extended interview with Joanne Lees who "is determined to honour her partner's memory by confronting the awful past." Australian sculptor Ewen Coates is working with Lees to construct a memorial for Falconio at the crime scene. Lees was interviewed alongside her Australian half-sister. As the daughter of an Australian father, Lees announced her intention to apply for Australian citizenship.

=== Telefilm ===
In March 2007, Channel Ten in Australia presented a docudrama covering events from the night of the murder through to sentencing, from Lees' perspective. The roles of Lees and Falconio were played by Joanne Froggatt and Laurence Breuls. It was also shown by ITV1 in the UK on 8 April 2007, by TV One in New Zealand on 10 June 2007 and by RTL 2 in Germany on 12 January 2009.
