= Falconio =

Falconio is a surname. Notable people with the surname include:

- Peter Falconio (1973-2001), British tourist who disappeared in the Australian outback
- Diomede Falconio (1842-1917), Italian Roman Catholic cardinal
- Placido Falconio (16th century), Italian composer
