= Sinem Saban =

Australian filmmaker

Sinem Saban is an Australian film writer, producer, director, and human rights activist. She is best known for directing and producing the film Our Generation.

== Biography ==
Saban was born to Turkish Cypriot parents who emigrated to Australia in the early 1970s. She studied Media, Aboriginal and Legal Studies at RMIT University and at La Trobe University in Melbourne whilst volunteering at her local Aboriginal culture centre in Geelong, Victoria. In 2000, her interest to find out more about traditional Aboriginal culture led her to move to Darwin where she completed her Secondary Teaching education at Charles Darwin University. In 2004, she was invited to join musician Michael Franti to film and document the human cost of war in Iraq, Palestine and Israel for his film I Know I'm Not Alone. Upon returning to Australia, she continued teaching in the Yirrkala, Maningrida and Galiwin'ku communities and followed her passion for Indigenous rights. In her spare time, Saban was invited to film and take photographs of Yolngu life, hunting, ceremonies and stories. With the Northern Territory Intervention in 2007, Saban embarked on making "Our Generation".

== Filmography ==
| Year | Title | Contribution | Note |
|---|---|---|---|
| 2010 | Our Generation | Director, editor, cinematographer and producer | Documentary film |
