= Our Generation (film) =

- Directed by: Sinem Saban; Damien Curtis
- Music by: John Butler
- Release date: August 2010
- Running time: 73 minutes
- Country: Australia
- Language: English

Our Generation is a 2010 Australian documentary film about the struggle of Aboriginal Australians in the Northern Territory to retain their land, culture and freedom.

== Overview ==
Our Generation analyzes relations between Aboriginal Australians and European Australians, from the beginning of colonisation until the present day and looks at ongoing Government policies of paternalism and forced assimilation, explores some of the issues underlying current Aboriginal disadvantage, and upholds the right of First Australians to dignity, culture and empowerment in their own country.

Throughout the documentary, many opinions and testimonies from members of the Yolngu people of Northeast Arnhem Land are shared.

The film also shows how Kevin Rudd's 2008 apology to the Stolen Generations has done nothing to alter the Australian Government's mistreatment of Aboriginal Australians. The Australian Government continues to undermine Aboriginal people's basic human rights, continuing to prevent and restrict their involvement in decisions which affect themselves and their communities, access to basic services, the ability to retain and maintain Aboriginal languages, and the ability to remain on their ancestral homelands.

== Issues ==
Our Generation explores and raises awareness of some major modern issues faced by Aboriginal Australians.

Some of the issues presented in the film are:

=== Health ===
Despite Australia being one of the world's richest nations, Aboriginal Australians have the worst health and living conditions of any Indigenous group in the world and they live, on average, 17 years less than non-Aboriginal Australians. In remote communities in the Northern Territory, infant mortality is three times higher than the rest of Australia and diseases that aren't often found in developed countries are widespread.

=== Northern Territory Intervention ===
The 2007 Northern Territory Intervention was a Government response to the 2007 Little Children are Sacred report on child abuse in Aboriginal communities. The policy rushed through parliament in 48 hours, and after five years of this policy being in place; the amount of child abuse has doubled, school attendance rates are lower, overall health is worse and there is a five-fold increase in the amount of suicides. The intervention will continue until at least 2021 under the Stronger Futures policy.

=== Homelands ===
In 2009, the Australians Government introduced the Working Futures policy, which aims to move Aboriginal Australians away from the Homelands or Outstations, which were built to enable Aboriginal Australians to live in the same areas as their ancestors, and into larger and often overcrowded townships.

=== Education ===
School attendance rates in the Northern Territory are the lowest in Australia and Aboriginal schools, especially those in remote areas, are the most under resourced. To improve school attendance rates and education quality, many Aboriginal people have requested to be more involved in the creation of culturally appropriate curricula for their children.

Recent Northern Territory government policies have led to many Aboriginal languages no longer being taught in schools.

=== Human Rights ===
The Australian Government's treatment of Aboriginal Australians has been condemned by the United Nations Special Rapporteur on Indigenous Rights, James Anaya in 2009, and again by United Nations High Commissioner for Human Rights, Navi Pillay in 2011. An Amnesty International campaign has been created to challenge the Government's homelands policy.

=== Cross-Cultural Understanding ===
To achieve genuine Reconciliation, it is noted that non-Aboriginal Australians will need to have more awareness of Aboriginal Australian cultures.

=== Respecting Traditional Law and Governance ===
Aboriginal society has long had a complex system of Law and Governance which is different and often at odds with the Westminster system introduced by Europeans. Non-Aboriginal Australians failing to respect the importance of traditional law is a major contributor to the current lawlessness and social breakdown in Aboriginal communities.

=== Constitutional Reform ===
The Australian Constitution which came into effect in 1901 permits racial discrimination and also makes no mention of the human rights of Aboriginal Australians. In January 2012, a Government appointed Expert Panel on Constitutional Reform recommended that the Constitution should recognise Aboriginal people as the First Australians, that their cultures and languages should be respected, and that racial discrimination should not be permitted. In order for changes to be made to the Constitution, it must achieve a double majority in a National Referendum.

=== Treaty and Sovereignty ===
Unlike the United States, Canada and New Zealand, no treaty was ever negotiated between Indigenous Australians and European settlers. During the European colonisation of Australia, settlers avoided signing treaties by claiming that Australia was terra nullius, or uninhabited when they arrived. Many Aboriginal people feel that their sovereignty was not and still is not respected and that a treaty should be created.

== Production ==
Our Generation was created as a response to the Howard government's controversial ‘Emergency Intervention’ into remote Aboriginal communities in the Northern Territory and the lack of mainstream media coverage of the voices and plight of people in these communities. The intervention, which was supposedly undertaken solely to protect children from abuse, saw the removal of all existing Aboriginal land rights, the suspension of the Racial Discrimination Act, and more than 70 Aboriginal communities being placed under compulsory government control, all without consulting or gaining consent from any of the people in these communities.

Production began without a script or a pre-determined story. The filmmakers talked with many Aboriginal people across the Northern Territory, and after 3 years they had compiled over 200 hours of footage. After the rough cut was completed, the film was screened in many community centres across Northeast Arnhem Land.

According to Director Sinem Saban, the film's style was inspired by Michael Moore's documentary Bowling For Columbine.

== Reception ==
Australian musician John Butler has stated, "[Our Generation] is an important film that everyone needs to see. It will change your life."

Cathy Henkel, director of The Burning Season noted that "if ever Australia had an Inconvenient Truth, this is it. Our Generation is a highly emotional, powerful journey into territory that we have chosen too long to ignore... This is a film every Australian needs to see."

Australian journalist John Pilger, who has himself made several documentaries on the subject, observed:

"Our Generation is a very fine piece of work. It's truthful, eloquent and, above all, it explains very clearly to first-timers and the many who need reminding why the Indigenous people of Australia are once again being defrauded of their human and political rights in a country calling itself a democracy."

— John Pilger, Our Generation.

== Cast ==
(As themselves)

- Tom Calma
- Harry Reynolds
- Bob Randall
- Prof. Larissa Behrendt
- Djunga Djunga Yunupingu
- Marcus Mungal Lacey
- Barmulla Burrawanga
- Rev. Dr. Djiniyini Gondarra
- John Mazower
- Dr. Paul Burgess
- Judy Gurruwiwi
- Mungul Burrawanga
- Guyuwanga Gondarra
- Brenda Mutha
- Madeleine Gaykamangu
- Reggie Wuridjal
- Gandhuwuy Garrawurra
- Guymun Dhamarranydji
- Megan Belatj Ganambarr
- Yananymul Munungurr
- Yingiya Guyula
- Joy Dindjin White
- Barbara Shaw
- John Greatorex
- Jonny Burrmula
- Judy Djanunbe
- Djiniyini Gondarra
- Les Malezer

== Broadcasting ==
Country	Network(s)/Station(s)
Australia	NITV

== Awards ==
Ceremony	Category	Result
London International Documentary Festival	Best Campaign Film	Won
2011 Asia Pacific Screen Awards		Nominated

== See also ==
- Stolen Generations
- Utopia
- The Coconut Revolution
- Crude
