= Rex Wild =

Australian Queen's Counsel

Rex Stephen Wild AO KC is a former Director of Public Prosecutions for the Northern Territory of Australia.

== Career ==
Wild was appointed to the position of Director of Public Prosecutions for the Northern Territory in 1998, retiring in 2006.

One of his most prominent trials occurred in late 2005 when he led the prosecution of Bradley John Murdoch for the murder of Peter Falconio; he said that this would be his final case as Director of Public Prosecutions, a pledge he fulfilled by retiring. He returned to private law practice when his tenure was completed.

He was co-author, with human rights advocate Pat Anderson, of the 2007 "Little Children are Sacred" report into the sexual abuse of Indigenous Australian children in the Northern Territory.

== Honours ==
In the 2019 Australia Day Honours, Wild was made an Officer of the Order of Australia (AO) for "distinguished service to the law, particularly to criminal litigation and inquiry, and to the community of the Northern Territory".
