= Stronger Futures policy =

Australian government policy

The Stronger Futures policy was a multifaceted social policy of the Australian government concerning the Aboriginal population of the Northern Territory. It was underpinned by the Stronger Futures in the Northern Territory Act 2012, which ceased 10 years after its commencement on 29 June 2012.

On 23 November 2011, the Stronger Futures legislation was introduced in the Parliament of Australia by Jenny Macklin, the Minister for Families, Community Services and Indigenous Affairs, and was subsequently supported by the Prime Minister, Julia Gillard. The policy intended to address key issues that exist within Indigenous communities of the Northern Territory such as unemployment, low school enrolment and attendance, alcohol abuse, community safety and child protection issues, food security, and housing and land reforms. Several years of similar initiatives preceded the policy, including the "Building Stronger Regions, Stronger Futures" policy, "New Local Government" policy, and the Northern Territory National Emergency Response Act 2007.

The Stronger Futures legislation maintains key components of the Northern Territory National Emergency Response Act 2007 and includes bills such as the Stronger Futures in the Northern Territory Bill of 2011, Stronger Futures in the Northern Territory (Consequential and Transitional Provisions) Bill 2011 and the Social Security Legislation Amendment Bill of 2011. The legislation proposed to extend both the time frame and the geographic scope of these measures. The Stronger Futures legislation was passed in the House of Representatives with small changes on 27 February 2012 and was passed by the Senate on 29 June. The Australian Government claimed that consultations with Aboriginal communities of the Northern Territory helped to construct the Stronger Futures.

The policy has been criticised by rights organisations such as Amnesty International and Concerned Citizens of Australia. The Stand for Freedom campaign leads the public movement against this legislation and criticises many measures of the legislation since they maintain "racially-discriminatory" elements of the Northern Territory Emergency Response Act and continue the control by the Australian Government over "Aboriginal people and their lands." In addition, the campaign is critical of the inadequacy of the Aboriginal consultations, saying that the decisions derived from these consultations rarely coincided with the actual desires of the affected communities.

== Building Stronger Regions, Stronger Futures policy ==
The Building Stronger Regions, Stronger Futures policy, launched on 3 May 2003 by the Northern Territory Community Development Minister Jack Ah Kit, involved consultation between the Northern Territory Government and Indigenous group leaders of the Northern Territory to form a regional governance system and improve service delivery outcomes within the Northern Territory. Due to the high failure rate of small councils in the Northern Territory, their increased dependence on non-Aboriginal staff for basic needs, and the corrupt and fraudulent activity within local governments, the policy created representative and administrative regional authorities and transfused local governments into twenty large and stable councils. The regional authorities would sustain initiatives of regional development, require the support of residents, supply decision-making structures and provide a culturally based electorate.

The Local Government Act of 1978, which established community governance structures in remote areas of the Northern Territory and promoted local governments in Aboriginal communities, supplied an appropriate statutory foundation for these authorities. In addition, the policy addressed capacity development in governance through the development of improved financial and service capacity monitoring, instatement of development officers and establishment of stronger administration in local and regional areas.

In 2004, at the end of the policy's first year of application, the Australian Government abolished the Aboriginal and Torres Strait Islander Commission (ATSIC), which was a "statutory based national forum for Indigenous Australians based on the election of representatives from every state and territory." Through this abolition, the Indigenous people of the NT had much lessened representation in the Commonwealth government, and the regional governments were promoted as an alternative. In mid-2005, the Northern Territory negotiated with the Australian Government to produce the "Overarching Agreement on National Affairs". This agreement detailed the collaborative goals of the Australian Government and Northern Territory and outlined the initiatives of the Building Stronger Regions, Stronger Futures policy. These were:

- "The implementation of legitimate and effective representation"
- "The establishment of Regional Authorities which would involve voluntary amalgamations of community councils based on extensive and effective consultation to ensure constitutions reflect local aspirations and have cultural legitimacy"
- "The amalgamation of community councils into Regional Authorities to effectively addresses current problems of scale, improve service delivery, reduce staff turnover and ensure greater coordination and continuity of interest in community economic and social development."

This agreement defined the anticipated outcome of the regional authorities. In late 2006, the Building Stronger Regions, Stronger Futures policy was replaced with the New Local Government Policy due to "ideological dissatisfaction and implementation difficulties experienced by government bureaucrats in trying to accommodate Indigenous regional concepts, ideas about representation for local government and consensus methods of decision making." The discussion-based approach of the Building Stronger Regions, Stronger Futures policy took time and strained the resources and capacity of both Governments.

== New Local Government Policy ==
In 2006, the Australian Government enacted the New Local Government Policy which established mandatory regionalisation within the Northern Territory and outlined nine regions, which were to be acknowledged as shires, to command a single democratic governance structure through a "one size fits all" approach. The policy exhibited similar flexibility in Indigenous governance structures and decision-making processes, compared to the Building Stronger Regions, Stronger Futures policy, yet effectively ignored culturally based processes of local governance, Indigenous governance systems and cultural geographies within the shire structure.

In order to address Indigenous input, the policy created 'transitional committees' through which the Australian Government could provide advice about shires and non-Indigenous individuals and stakeholders could participate.

== Northern Territory National Emergency Response Act 2007 ==
In August 2007, the Coalition Australian Government responded to the ALP NT government's Little Children are Sacred report, with the Northern Territory National Emergency Response Act 2007, bringing about what became known as "The Intervention". This was developed without the involvement of the NT government. Through this Act, the Australian Government seized administrative control of sixty remote Indigenous communities, attained compulsory leases on Indigenous settlements for a minimum of a five-years and enacted legislation to act on these changes. As a result, "all communities located on the Aboriginal inalienable freehold land under the Aboriginal Land Rights Act 1976 would have their permit systems revoked."

In addition, the Australian Government sent an Emergency Response Taskforce, which included the Australian Army and Department of Families, Community Services and Indigenous Affairs, to "priority communities" in order to ensure requirements of the Act were carried out and oversee health checks on Aboriginal children.

At the November 2007 federal election the ALP was voted into power, and expressed a desire to evaluate the new Act.

== Northern Territory Emergency Response Evaluation ==
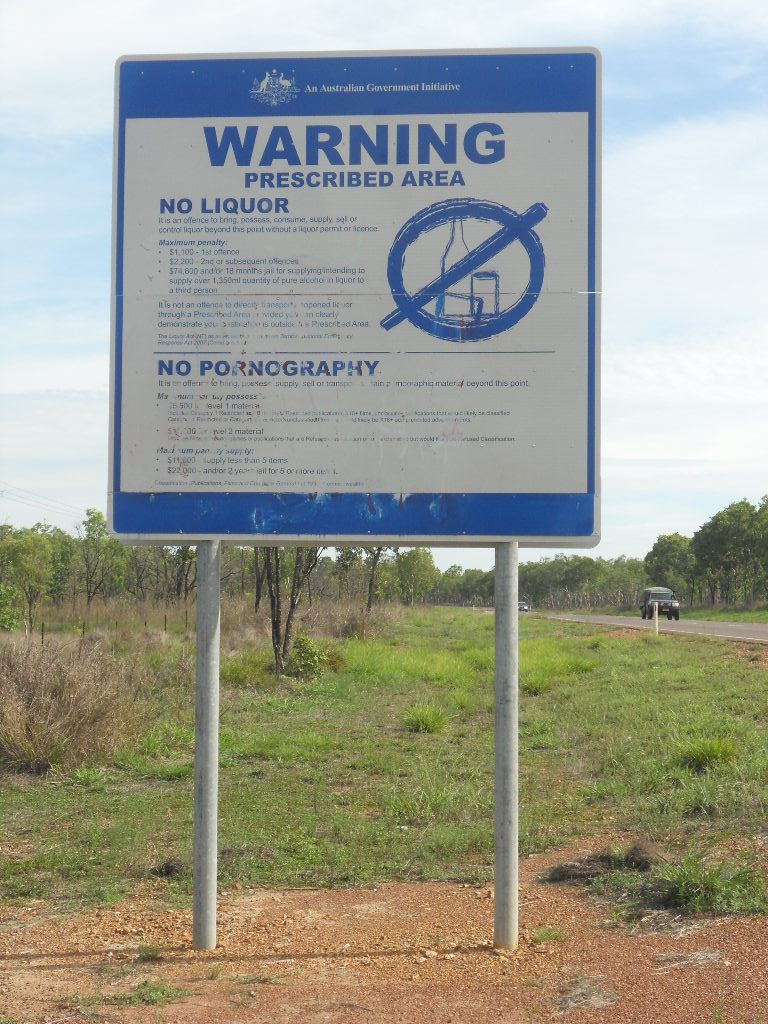
'Prescribed Area'

In October 2008, after an examination of an independent review of the Northern Territory Intervention, the Australian Government pledged to recognise the extreme disadvantage and social seclusion experienced by remote communities within the Northern Territory, form a legitimate relationship with the Indigenous people based on consultation, acknowledge Australian human rights responsibilities and reinstate the Racial Discrimination Act 1975. From June to August 2009, the Government held consultations with Aboriginal communities in the Northern Territory to identify the proper direction for the Northern Territory Emergency Response. In June 2010, as a result of these consultations, the Australian Parliament passed legislation to "reinstate the operation of the Racial Discrimination Act 1975 in relation to the Northern Territory Emergency Response, introduce a new, non-discriminatory scheme of income management, redesign the alcohol and pornography restrictions, five-year leases and community stores licensing, redesign law enforcement powers to improve and make them sustainable for the greater long-term benefit of Indigenous people."

In 2011, representatives of the Northern Territory Government and Australian Government, assisted by independent advisory groups from the community, compiled an Evaluation Report of the Northern Territory Emergency Response Act to discover if initiatives within the Intervention were effective and produced desirable outcomes. The report identified measures of the Intervention which drew positive support from Northern Territory community members such as the utilisation of Indigenous Engagement Officers, establishment of Government Business Models, increased presence of police and use of night patrols. In addition, the report revealed how the Intervention expanded educational systems, reduced school overcrowding and increased the availability of teaching positions.

Despite these improvements, the report recognised that "a key gap in the evaluative evidence that we have addressed was the systematic collection of data about the experiences and views of local peoples from the NTER communities." The report identified certain problems within the Northern Territory Emergency Response such as the blanket imposition of initiatives, especially those that demanded behavioral change such as income management, and the suspension of the Racial Discrimination Act 1975. The report identified specific issues within the Intervention such as the lack of interpreter services, persistent challenge of housing, high rates of violent crime and alcohol-related offenses, low employment rates, and low rates of school attendance. The report received widespread criticism, such as that it was a hasty reaction to allegations and not properly planned or thought through, and that it was nothing more than another attempt to control these Aboriginal communities. Through this evaluation, the Australian Government recognised the large discrepancy which persists between non-Indigenous and Indigenous peoples within the Northern Territory and has created the "Stronger Futures" Policy along with several pieces of supportive legislation to continue "closing the gap."

== Stronger Futures policy of 2011 ==
On 23 November 2011, Hon Jenny Macklin MP, the Minister for Families, Housing, Community Services and Indigenous Affairs introduced legislation to Parliament in order to address issues within the Northern Territory and released the Stronger Futures policy statement. The Stronger Futures in the Northern Territory legislation seeks to address the disadvantaged position of Aboriginal Territorians in the Northern Territory and create a collaboration between the Northern Territory Government and Aboriginal Territorians to construct a strong future together. This engagement of different governance bodies, the Aboriginal Territorians, Northern Territory Government and Australian Government, seeks to encourage reform and improve service delivery across the Northern Territory. The Stronger Futures in the Northern Territory Policy statement declares, "At the heart of this work will be the views of Aboriginal people in the Northern Territory." The Australian Government identified imperative issues within the Northern Territory such as appropriate education, rampant alcohol abuse, housing availability and the deficient supply of economic and employment opportunities.

=== Supporting legislation ===
The Australian Government intends for all legislation to occur in collaboration with Northern Territory Indigenous communities, which the Government recognises did not happen during instatement of Northern Territory Response Act. All legislative measures will continue to comply with the Racial Discrimination Act 1975.

- The Stronger Futures in the Northern Territory Bill 2011 supports the ability for Aboriginals in the NT to have families and cultivate livelihoods. The measures within the Bill express a desire to create communities in the Northern Territory where children can grow up safe and healthy.
- The Stronger Futures in the Northern Territory (Consequential and Transitional Provisions) Bill 2011 proposes repeals of Northern Territory Emergency Response Act of 2007, amendments to Commonwealth Laws to improve operation of existing measures like pornography restrictions and prohibitions on considering customary law in bail and sentencing decision.
- The Social Security Legislation Amendment Bill 2011 intends to assist disadvantaged and vulnerable Australians and improve school attendance. Certain legislative measure seek to address the issue of alcohol abuse in the Territory by allowing State and Northern Territory authorities to refer people to income management, which is an initiative that reduces the amount of discretionary funds that can be spent on harmful substances such as drugs or alcohol and ensures that money is spent on basic needs such as food and shelter. This provision is similar to the Child Protection Measure, which allows child protection workers to refer people for income management.

=== Content ===
==== Jobs ====
Through consultations with Aboriginal community members, the Australian Government recognised how unemployment continues to be a central problem in the Northern Territory yet this will be addressed through the Stronger Futures policy by a jobs package of 19.1 million in funding over four years. In terms of job creation, the Government will introduce 50 new ranger positions in the Working with the Country program, which builds on traditional Indigenous knowledge on how to manage the land, and deliver 280 existing positions in the Northern Territory. The Australian Government will provide job support to Indigenous communities to encourage the ability for Indigenous people to gain jobs in their area, rather than outsiders, and establish job brokers in the area to help skilled Indigenous people connect to businesses that are experiencing shortages. The new program called Local Jobs for Local People" creates Indigenous traineeships which will help 100 Indigenous people in the Northern Territory to fill service delivery jobs in their communities according to availability. The Australian Government supports the Northern Territory Government's initiative which awards jobs in the Australian Public Service or with organisations delivering government funded services to those who finish year 12. The policy will provide micro-enterprise support in which the Australian Government will extend the Indigenous Communities in Business Program to two additional communities.

==== School enrolment and attendance ====
In partnership with the Northern Territory Government, the Australian Government will expand the current School Enrolment and Attendance Measure, or SEAM, so that it aligns with the Northern Territory Government's strategy of Every Child Every Day. Both measures intend to promote parental responsibility in terms of children attendance and enrolment. Before SEAM implementation in communities, the Government will hold seminars for parents to explain their responsibilities under the SEAM measure and to cultivate understanding that their income entitlements may be affected if their children do not enrol in or attend school. The Government will send a letter to parents at the beginning of each school term to remind them of their responsibilities and of the SEAM arrangements.

The Government commits to holding conferences with parents if their child falls behind the benchmark for attendance and asking parents to agree to attendance plans through which additional support and links can be provided. In addition, the government will suspend income support payments of parents who don't follow attendance plan and these payments will be reinstated once they are in compliance with the attendance plan. Within the SEAM measure, the data exchange between schools and Centrelink will ensure mobile students do not fall through cracks.

==== Alcohol abuse ====
The Australian Government identified alcohol abuse as the center of dysfunction within communal and familial structures of the Northern Territory. Therefore, the "Enough is Enough" alcohol reforms intend to target problem drinking and expand opportunities for alcoholism rehabilitation and treatment. The Stronger Futures policy addresses the issues of alcohol traders by allowing the Commonwealth Indigenous Affairs Minister, under the Northern Territory Liquor Act, to request the appointment of an independent assessor to review licensee operations. In collaboration with the Northern Territory Government, the Australian Government will conduct an independent review, with Indigenous leader involvement, of alcohol laws such as the Northern Territory Government's Enough is Enough, the Stronger Future's alcohol restriction and the Northern Territory Liquor Act. The policy continues current alcohol restrictions yet strengthens penalties for grog running. The penalty for liquor offenses under 1350 milliliters will be increased to include six months imprisonment. The Stronger Futures provisions call for a continuation of signage to inform residents and visitors about alcohol rules within communities.

==== Community safety and child protection ====
The Australian and Northern Territory Governments intend to help ensure the safety of communities, in particular that of women and children residents. The Stronger Futures policy provisions propose small alterations to prohibit the consideration of customary law and cultural practice in bail and sentencing decisions for offenses against the Commonwealth and Northern Territory laws that protect cultural heritage such as sacred sites and cultural heritage objects. Under the Stronger Futures policy, additional restrictions will be applied to refused classification material in areas called prohibited material areas, which are declared by the Commonwealth Indigenous Affairs Minister. Furthermore, certain provisions will continue under Stronger Futures legislation such as the power for the Australian Crime Commission to address the violence and sex abuse against Indigenous persons and the ability for Australian Federal Police to the assume capacity and responsibility of the Northern Territory police. The policy provisions eliminate the current legislative requirements for internet filters and audits on publicly funded computers and replace them with the requirement for Commonwealth funded organisations to address and avoid the inappropriate use of publicly funded computers.

==== Food security ====
The Government will continue the licensing of community stores to ensure the availability of fresh and health food in Northern Territory communities under legislation that defines licensing arrangements, describes the necessary conditions under which licences are granted, includes business registration requirements and ascribes assessment procedures. In addition, there will be a new range of penalties for stores that breach licensing agreements such as fines and injunctions. The legislation will require licensing for stores in designated food security areas in order to ensure that remote communities have a secure access to food.

==== Housing and land reforms ====
The Australian Government is committed to providing voluntary five-year leases and will not extend the measure for compulsory five-year leases in the Northern Territory Emergency Response Act. In addition, "the Australian Government and Northern Territory Government will continue negotiate leases with Aboriginal landowners to manage social housing in remote areas." Furthermore, the legislation allows for the Australian Government to instate regulations that ease leasing on town camp and community living area land in the Northern Territory in order to encourage Aboriginal landowners to use their land for a wider range of functions such as economic development and private land ownership. The Australian Government in collaboration with the Northern Territory Government seek to ensure the establishment of fair standards for social housing provisions by non-governmental organisations. In addition, beginning in areas with township leases, both Governments ensure that building protections are applied in remote communities of the Northern Territory.

==== Sunset and review ====
The Stronger Futures Act has a sunset clause, terminating the effect of its provisions 10 years after the date of commencement. It also stipulates that there should be Independent review of Commonwealth and Northern Territory laws relating to alcohol to be begun after two years and completed within three years of commencement of the Act, as well as a review of the operation of the whole Act within three years, and submitted within four years.

== Reaction ==
=== Criticism ===
In response to the Stronger Futures legislation, Amnesty International called on the Australian Government to collaborate with the Indigenous communities of the Northern Territory and construct appropriate approaches that "respect the rights of those affected." Rodney Dillon, the Amnesty International Campaigner of Australian Indigenous Rights, referring to the Northern Territory National Emergency Response Act, states "The Government must recognise that local issues need local solutions rather than the failed one-size-fits-all Intervention policies that were imposed upon communities four years ago."

The organisation has discussed how the Australian Government must adopt a holistic approach to service delivery, which is based on the actual location of where Indigenous people live, and address the one-third of Indigenous people living in remote homelands without financial support. Amnesty International concludes that they are "calling for policies and programs to be brought in line with the minimum standards set out in the UN Declaration on the Rights of Indigenous Peoples and grounded in the free, prior and informed consent of Aboriginal people living in the Northern Territory."

The 'Stand for Freedom' campaign leads the movement against the implementation of the Stronger Futures legislation. The campaign criticises elements of the Northern Territory Emergency Response Act of being culturally and racially discriminating and claims these features remains consistent in the Stronger Futures policy. The Stand for Freedom website discusses how 450 submission were made to the Senate Committees' inquiry into legislation, from a variety of organisations including the National Congress of Australia's First Peoples and the Australian Council of Social Service, and how 95 percent of the submissions opposed the legislation. The campaign has outlined several measures that enhance government control over Aboriginals and their land:

- It excludes Aboriginal customary law and traditional cultural practices from criminal sentencing decisions
- It bans all alcohol on large swathes of Aboriginal land, and continues to suspend the permit system in Aboriginal townships, even though these measures have been opposed by the Northern Territory's Aboriginal Peak Organisations.
- It provides excessively increased penalties for alcohol possession, "including 6 months potential jail time for a single can of beer and 18 months for more than 1.35L of alcohol."
- It provides the Australian Crime Commission with "'Star Chamber' powers" when it investigates Aboriginal communities, overriding the right to remain silent.
- It provides police the right to "enter houses and vehicles in Aboriginal communities without a warrant" if they suspect alcohol possession.
- Makes laws "allowing for information to be transferred about an individual, to any Federal, State or Territory government department or agency, without an individual’s knowledge or consent."
- It bans all "sexually explicit or very violent material" on Aboriginal Land.
- It gives the Commonwealth control over "local regulations in Community Living Areas and town camps."
- It expands the School Enrolment and Attendance Measure (SEAM). Under the measure, parents of truant students (who are absent more than once a week) will receive smaller welfare payments. This action ignores "rising concerns among Aboriginal families regarding inappropriate education"
- The two thousand remaining paid Community Development Employment Program positions will be cut by April 2012. This is, in Stand for Freedom's view, "the final attack on a vibrant program which was the lifeblood of many communities, employing upwards of 7500 people before the Northern Territory Intervention."
- Changes proposed to the Social Security Act would constitute "further attacks on the rights of welfare recipients."

Several prominent figures in Australia have expressed opposition to the Stronger Futures legislation. Mick Gooda, the Aboriginal and Torres Strait Islander Social Justice Commissioner, discussed the "inadequacy" of the Aboriginal consultations within a report by the Australian Human Rights Commission, in which he identified key issues within the Stronger Futures policy including the lack of cultural competency and attention paid to the competency and ability of Aboriginal governments.

A group of Aboriginal Elders of the Northern Territory released a statement in a response to the Stronger Futures legislation which was titled, "No More! Enough is Enough!". The statement discussed their rejection of their Stronger Futures legislation and called on the Australian Government to issue an apology for the "hurt, embarrassment, shame and stigma" that Aboriginals in the Northern Territory experienced because of the measures within the Intervention. The Elders accused the Australian government of being in breach of its international treaty obligations to the First Nations people, due to its membership to the United Nations, through its inability to eliminate racial discrimination. The Elders identified several measures which would help ensure a strong future for their children, including: bilingualism in schools, rewards for attendance, leadership roles in localised school programs, a reflection of traditional knowledge in the curriculum, and the fair treatment of Aboriginal teachers in a culturally sensitive manner.

A statement by 28 leading Australians, including Professor of Anthropology Jon Altman, Hon Ian Viner, and Hon Malcolm Fraser criticised the policy since there is no apparent attempt to involve Aboriginal people or Elders and discussed how the policy lacked informed consent on part of the affected communities. The individuals wrote about the "iniquitous and demeaning nature of income management", and how SEAM is an "obvious injustice to children depriving their parents of the means of support for them." The individuals asserted that the policy violates the UN Convention on the Rights of the Child and the Declaration on the Rights of Indigenous Peoples and breaches the Racial Discrimination Act 1975. The individuals called on the Government to abandon the legislation and set up appropriate mechanisms to involve Aboriginals leaders and Elders of the Northern Territory in the decision-making processes that define their future. Despite widespread condemnation, the Stronger Futures legislation passed on 29 June 2012.

=== Support ===
The Stronger Futures policy is regarded by the Government as an important initiative to improve the quality and access of education for children in the Northern Territory through a $583 million investment, as discussed by Jenny Macklin, Peter Garrett MP, the Minister for School Education, Warren Snowdon MP, the Minister for Indigenous Health, and Senator Trish Crossin, Senator for the Northern Territory, in a joint media release. The officials detail how the policy provides for the retainment of teaching positions in remote Northern Territory schools and investment of teaching initiatives. In addition the policy will supply funding for the creation of teacher housing in remote Northern Territory communities and provide assistance to the Northern Territory Government for the professional development of Aboriginal workers in the education system. In addition, the releases states how the Stronger Futures policy will continue funding of a nutrition program that provides meals to 5,000 students in 67 schools every day.

In another media release, members of the Australian Government, including Macklin, Snowdon, Kate Ellis and Trish Crossin, suggest that the Stronger Futures policy provides an investment of more than 443 million dollars to strengthen the safety and encourage the well-being of Aboriginal children, youth and families in the Northern Territory. This funding will support sixteen women's safe houses and allow for the expansion of a number of Communities for Children sites, which offer various services such as early learning and literacy programs and child nutrition advice. The input of community members will help define what services are offered. In addition, the policy funds Mobile Child Protection teams, the employment of twelve remote Aboriginal family and community workers, and the Youth in Communities Program, which help keep youth connected to school and away from substance abuse. Advocates of the Stronger Futures policy discuss how it encourages the livelihood of Indigenous community members and increases the amount of services for Aboriginal families in the Northern Territory.

Proponents of the Stronger Futures policy claim that it increases safety within Aboriginal communities of the Northern Territory. Members of the Australian Government, such as Jenny Macklin, Trish Crossin, Nicola Roxon, and Warren Snowdon, say the policy will provide $619 million in funding to boost services such as remote policing, community night patrols and legal assistance services. The funding will support the employment of sixty full-time Northern Territory police officers and help build four police complexes in the Northern Territory. The funding will provide Substance Abuse Intelligence Desks, which are intended to help bust drug distribution from other states into the Northern Territory and reduce substance abuse in remote communities of the Northern Territory as revealed by an independent review in 2012. In response to strong community support, the Australian Government will continue funding of night patrols. In addition, the funding will support the Northern Territory Child Abuse Taskforce. Furthermore, the Stronger Futures policy includes 76 million dollars in funding to tackle alcohol abuse in terms of extending current restrictions, developing alcohol management plans and increasing penalties for grog running. The Australian Government claims that through the funding provided by the Stronger Futures policy, the safety of Aboriginal communities in the Northern Territory will increase and the degree of alcohol abuse will decline.

== 2022 review ==
The alcohol restrictions are due to end in July 2022, with the communities and town camps having the option to continue the bans for a further two years in order to further consider what the community wishes to do. The NT Government has said that some communities have opted to apply for a licence for a local venue, but that any application would have to follow the usual processes for approval. Not all NT communities fall under the Stronger Futures legislation, and some will remain dry regardless, under existing NT laws.

A 2019 report showed that the Northern Territory has the highest consumption of alcohol per capita of all states and territories of Australia, and that much crime is driven by alcohol.

== See also ==
- Declaration on the Rights of Indigenous Peoples
- Little Children are Sacred
- Racial Discrimination Act 1975
- UN Convention on the Rights of the Child
- Our Generation
