= White Collar Blue =

Australian television series

- Created by: Steve Knapman; Kris Wyld
- Directed by: Ken Cameron; Ian Watson; Lynn Hegarty; Daniel Nettheim; Roger Hodgman; Brendan Maher
- Starring: Peter O'Brien; Freya Stafford; Brooke Satchwell; Don Hany; Richard Carter; Jodie Dry; Linda Cropper
- Country of origin: Australia
- Original language: English
- No. of seasons: 2
- No. of episodes: 44

Production
- Executive producer: Sue Masters
- Producers: Steve Knapman; Kris Wyld
- Running time: 60 minutes
- Production company: Knapman-Wyld Television

Original release
- Network: Network Ten
- Release: 12 August 2002 – 22 December 2003

White Collar Blue is an Australian television series made by Knapman-Wyld Television for Network Ten from 2002 to 2003.

Starring Peter O'Brien as Joe Hill and Freya Stafford as Harriet Walker, the series dealt with a division of the police force working in the city of Sydney and the personal and professional tensions affecting their work and lives.

In the pilot episode, Harriet is introduced as the new face to Kingsway station, transferring from the 'White Collar' federal police to the 'Blue Collar' New South Wales Police. Throughout the series Harriet must deal not only with her husband's brutal murder and the revelation of his adultery, but with learning to adjust and fit into her new surroundings.

Joe is Harriet's new partner, and isn't exactly welcoming to her as an addition to the team. With two daughters from previous marriages, Joe needs to juggle his homelife, his dedication to the job and his relationship with Nicole Brown, played by Jodie Dry.

The other cops at the station are Ted Hudson, played by Richard Carter, Sophia Marinkovitch (Brooke Satchwell) and Theo Rahme (Don Hany), and each have their own secrets and problems to deal with.

The series was cancelled after two seasons; however, it can be found on cable TV both in Australia and overseas (notably in Canada and New Zealand).

== Cast ==
=== Main / regular ===
- Peter O'Brien as Det. Joe Hill
- Freya Stafford as Det. Harriet Walker
- Brooke Satchwell as Sophia Marinkovitch
- Don Hany as Snr. Const. Theo Rahme
- Richard Carter as Ted Hudson
- Jodie Dry as Nicole Brown
- Linda Cropper as Magistrate Fran Hoffmann
- Dylan Redlich as Eliot Marinkovitch

=== Recurring ===
- Ivy Latimer as Lel (14 episodes)
- Nicholas Bishop as Lachlan Shaw (5 episodes)
- Rupert Reid as Shane Duggan (5 episodes)

=== Guests ===
| Actor | Role | Eps. |
|---|---|---|
| Abbie Cornish | Antonia McAlister | |
| Alex O'Loughlin | Ian Mack | 1 |
| Angela Punch McGregor | Win Absolom | 1 |
| Anne-Louise Lambert | Valerie Dunn | 1 |
| Barbara Stephens | Edith Franke | 1 |
| Bill Hunter | Fred Logan | 1 |
| Blair Venn | Michael Clear | 2 |
| Brooke Harman | Joy Garret | 1 |
| Carole Skinner | Mrs Simms | 1 |
| Caroline Brazier | Sonia Parry | 1 |
| Damon Gameau | Michael Carl | |
| Diana Glenn | Corrine Borich | 1 |
| Emma Lung | Andrea | 1 |
| Firass Dirani | Nick Zenopoulos | 1 |
| Geoff Cartwright | Colin Meredith | |
| Glenn Butcher | Theo's Doctor | 1 |
| Grant Bowler | Steve Petrovic | 1 |
| Helen Thomson | Rita Calliope | 1 |
| Holly Brisley | Amber Flood | 1 |
| Jacqueline Brennan | Ava Syme | 1 |
| Jason Clarke | Ray Jarvis | 2 |
| Jonny Pasvolsky | Sal Olivato | 1 |
| Julieanne Newbould | Daphne Mullins | 1 |
| Justin Rosniak | Bobby Manel | 1 |
| Justin Smith | Wayne Dobson | 1 |
| Kieran Darcy-Smith | Neil Jeffries | 1 |
| Kirrily White | Bridie Heron | 1 |
| Kristy Wright | Summah Shareef | 1 |
| Lachy Hulme | Frank Conti | 2 |
| Laurence Breuls | Jason Deekes | 1 |
| Leeanna Walsman | Angie | 1 |
| Lorna Lesley | Dr Rebecca Howell | 1 |
| Lucy Bell | Mia | 1 |
| Maeve Dermody | Amanda Payne | 2 |
| Mathew Wilkinson | Paul Gill | 1 |
| Matthew Le Nevez | Larry Drevo | 1 |
| Mercia Deane-Johns | Connie Ciric | 1 |
| Michael Denkha | Marinade | 3 |
| Nathan Page | Rick Calliope | 1 |
| Ned Manning | Brendan McAlister | 1 |
| Nicholas Brown | Damien Lewis | |
| Penny McNamee | Alicia Moore | 1 |
| Peter Curtin | Gen. Gerald Sinclair | 1 |
| Rachel Gordon | Mandi Peters | 1 |
| Ray Barrett | Barry Hill | |
| Rhiana Griffith | Lilly Derwent | 1 |
| Richard Brancatisano | Darcy Worth | 1 |
| Rohan Nichol | Lester Zwick | 1 |
| Rupert Reid | Shane Duggan | 5 |
| Russell Dykstra | Dale Tindle | 1 |
| Ryan Clark | Michael Spencer | |
| Ryan Johnson | Jared 'Mungo' Muntz | 2 |
| Simon Westaway | Jack McCabe | 1 |
| Tasma Walton | Gemma Mancuzzo | 2 |
| Tim Campbell | Father Michael Connelly | 1 |
| Tina Bursill | Carole | 1 |
| Toby Schmitz | Dirk Eikmeier | 2 |
| Tony Nikolakopoulos | Stavros | 1 |
| Wil Traval | Uniformed cop / Constable Tom Saunders | 3 |

== Awards ==
| Year | Award | Category | Result |
|---|---|---|---|
| 2002 | AFI Award | Best Actor in a Leading Role in a Television Drama (Peter O’Brien) | Nominated |
| 2003 | Logie Award | Silver Logie for Most Outstanding Actor in a Drama Series (Peter O’Brien | Won |
| 2003 | Logie Award | Silver Logie for Most Outstanding Actress in a Drama Series (Freya Stafford) | Nominated |
| 2003 | Logie Award | Most Popular New Female Talent (Jodie Dry) | Nominated |
| 2004 | AFI Award | Best Television Drama Series | Nominated |
| 2003 | AWGIE Award | Television – Series Episode #14 | Won |
