= Breaking the silence NSW =

Australian Anti-Child Abuse Organization

Breaking the Silence: Creating the Future. Addressing child sexual assault in Aboriginal communities in NSW released in 2006 was the report of the Aboriginal Sexual Assault Taskforce (ACSAT) in NSW, Australia, headed by Aboriginal leader, Marcia Ella-Duncan. The Task Force was set up by the NSW Attorney General's Department to look at why child sexual assault happens in Aboriginal communities and how government and NGOs respond to it.

ANTaR (Australians for Native Title and Reconciliation) stated that the government response makes sense, but they are concerned that the government refused to fund the program.

== See also ==
- Little Children are Sacred
- Northern Territory National Emergency Response
