= Pat Anderson (human rights advocate) =

Australian human rights advocate and health administrator

Pat Anderson AO
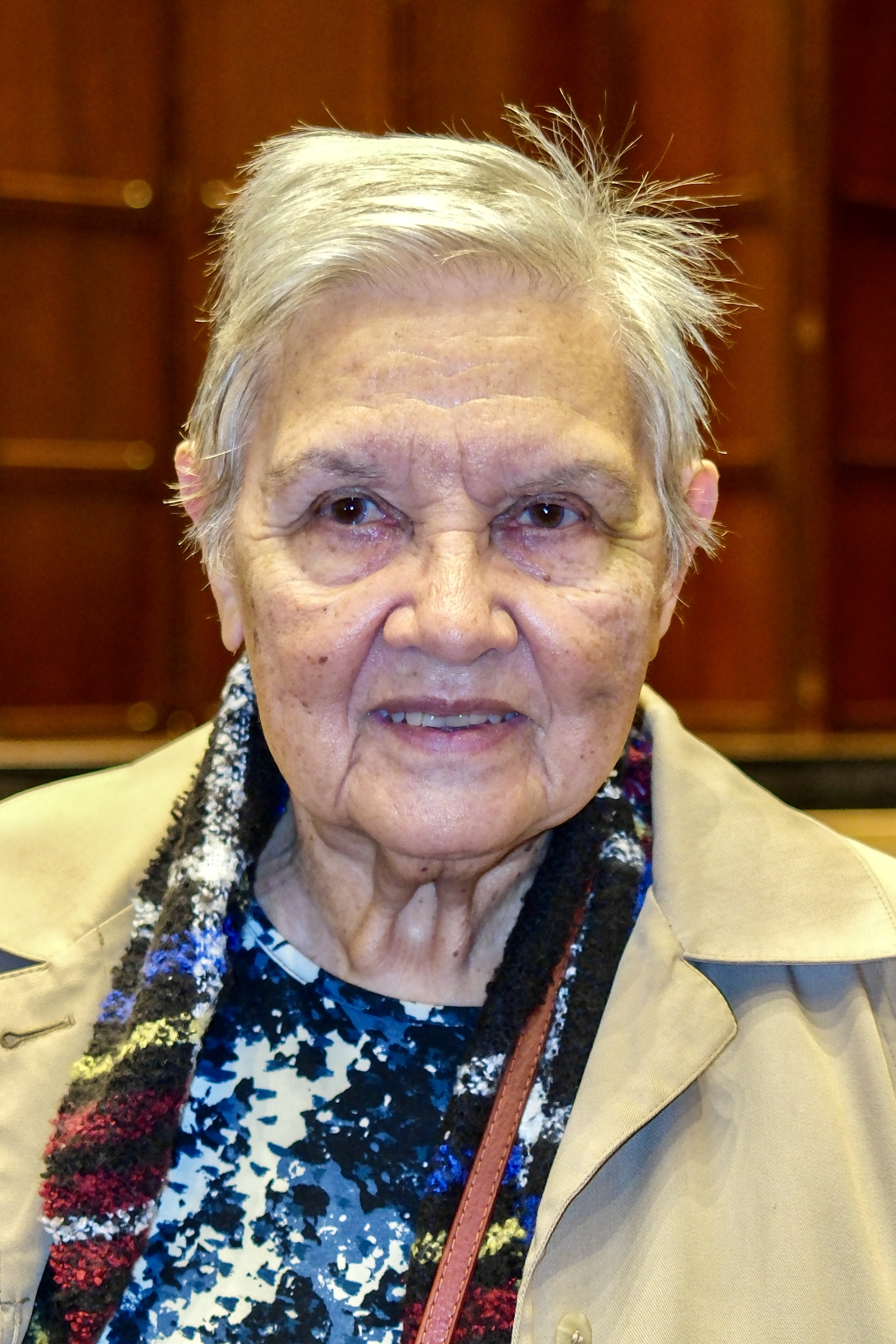
- Anderson at the Elder Conservatorium of Music on 3 June 2026
- Born: Patricia Audrey Anderson
- Education: University of Western Australia
- Occupations: Human rights advocate, health administrator

Patricia Audrey Anderson is an Australian human rights advocate and health administrator. An Alyawarre woman from the Northern Territory, she is well known internationally as a social justice advocate, advocating for improved health, educational, and protection outcomes for Indigenous Australian children.

== Early years ==
Anderson grew up in the Parap camp in Darwin, Northern Territory, encountering discrimination and racism. Her mother was part of the Stolen Generation.

Anderson was one of the first Aboriginal graduates from the University of Western Australia.

== Career and advocacy ==
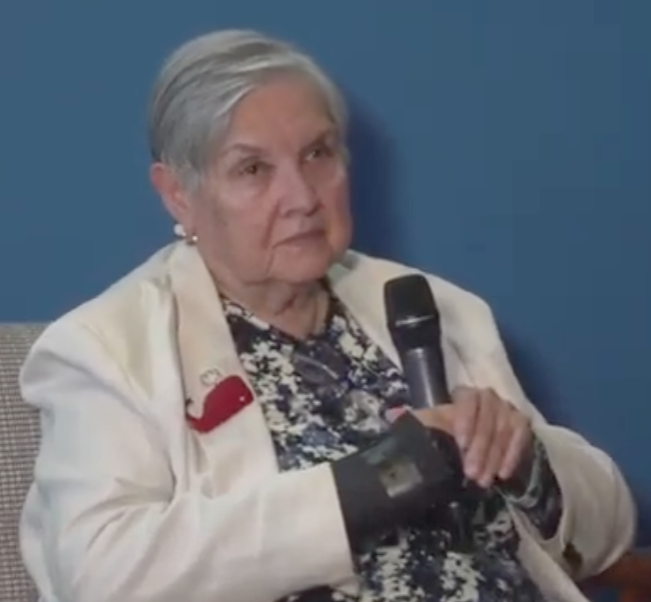
Anderson delivering the ANU's National Centre for Indigenous Genomics Inaugural Oration in 2022

"With an extensive career spanning community development, policy formation, and research ethics, Pat has dedicated her life to creating and nurturing understanding and compassion between Aboriginal and non-Aboriginal Australians" as stated by her Australian of the Year Awards biography. Anderson worked as a legal secretary for the Woodward Royal Commission into Aboriginal Land Rights. In the early 1990s Anderson became the CEO of Danila Dilba Aboriginal Health Service in Darwin. She held the positions of chair of the National Aboriginal Community Controlled Health Organisation, and executive officer of the Aboriginal Medical Services Alliance Northern Territory. She led the founding of the Cooperative Research Centre (CRC) for Aboriginal and Tropical Health in 1997, and when the Cooperative Research Centre was re-funded in 2003 as the CRC for Aboriginal Health, she took on the role of chair.

Anderson has spoken before the United Nations Working Group on Indigenous Populations. Together with Rex Wild QC, she co-authored the 2007 Little Children Are Sacred report on child abuse in the Northern Territory.

Anderson is the chairperson of the Lowitja Institute, Australia's national institute for Aboriginal and Torres Strait Islander health research. She was co-chair on the Referendum Council which consulted with hundreds of indigenous people to deliver the historic Uluru Statement from the Heart in May 2017. Anderson has also served continuously on the board of Literacy for Life Foundation, a charity which boosts literacy rates among First Nations adults through community-led adult literacy campaigns, since 2013.

In May 2020 Anderson delivered the Lowitja O'Donoghue Oration at the Don Dunstan Foundation.

== Works ==
- Priorities in Aboriginal health (1995) Aboriginal Health: Social and cultural transitions, 29-31.
- Aboriginal health : social and cultural transition, 1997
- Northern Territory. Board of Inquiry into the Protection of Aboriginal Children from Sexual Abuse; Wild, Rex; Anderson, Pat (2007), Ampe Akelyernemane Meke Mekarle: Little Children Are Sacred, Dept. of the Chief Minister, Office of Indigenous Policy, ISBN 978-0-9803874-1-4
- Research for a better future (2011), keynote address to 3rd Aboriginal health research conference.
- Beetson, J., Shwartz, M. Anderson, P. (7 December 2022), "'A life changing experience': how adult literacy programs can keep First Nations people out of the criminal justice system", The Conversation

== Awards ==
- 2007 Northern Territory Senior Australian of the Year
- 2007 Sidney Sax Public Health Medal - Public Health Association of Australia
- 2012 Human Rights Community Individual Award (Tony Fitzgerald Memorial Award)
- 2013 Honorary doctorate - Flinders University
- 2014 Officer of the Order of Australia (AO) for distinguished service to the Indigenous community as a social justice advocate
- 2015 Winner, public policy category, Australian Financial Review and Westpac 100 Women of Influence Awards
- 2016 Human Rights Medal - Australian Human Rights Commission
- 2017 Doctor of Medical Science honoris causa - Edith Cowan University
- 2018 NAIDOC Lifetime Achievement Award, for decades of advocacy for First Nations people
- 2018 Honorary doctorate in Law, University of NSW, in recognition of her lifetime campaign for social justice
- 2021 ACT's Senior Australian of the Year, "for her work in advancing the health of Indigenous people"
