= Northern Territory National Emergency Response =

Australian government intervention within indigenous Australian communities

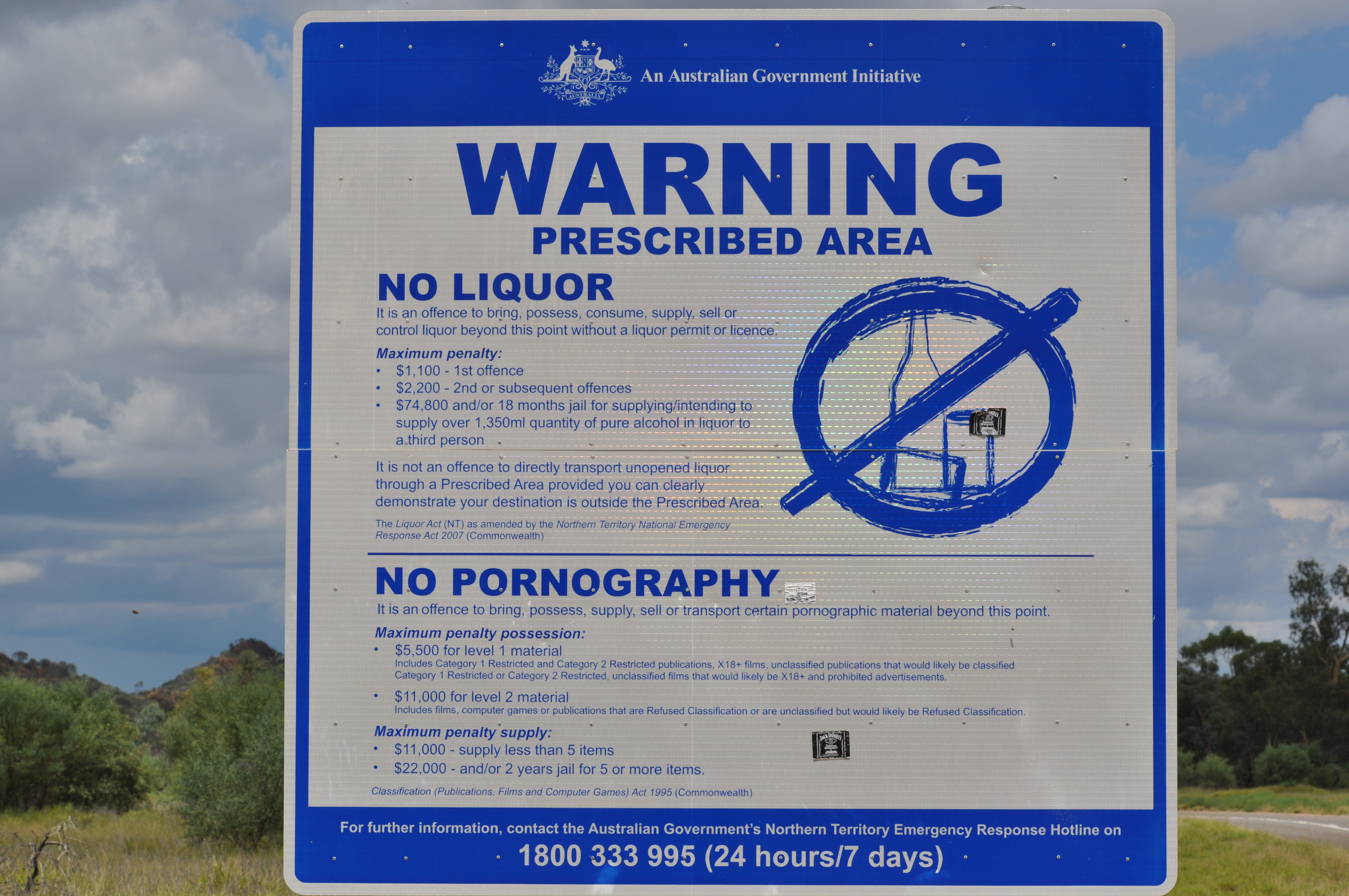
Alcohol and Pornography Ban Warning sign at an Aboriginal community near Alice Springs, Northern Territory

The Northern Territory National Emergency Response, also known as "The Intervention" or the Northern Territory Intervention, and sometimes the abbreviation "NTER" (for Northern Territory Emergency Response) was a package of measures enforced by legislation affecting Indigenous Australians in the Northern Territory (NT) of Australia, which lasted from 2007 until 2012. The measures included restrictions on the consumption of alcohol and pornography (including complete bans on both at some communities), changes to welfare payments, and changes to the delivery and management of education, employment and health services in the Territory.

The Intervention was brought about by the enactment of the Northern Territory National Emergency Response Act 2007 and several associated new Acts of Parliament, along with a raft of changes to existing laws, by the federal government of Australia. The legislation was introduced and passed by the Howard government in August 2007. The justification given for introducing the measures was the Little Children are Sacred report published in June 2007, being the findings of an inquiry into child sexual abuse in the NT commissioned by the Northern Territory Government.

The measures proved controversial, being criticised by the Northern Territory Labor government, the Human Rights and Equal Opportunity Commission and several Aboriginal leaders. A report by the Australian Human Rights Commission in 2008 said that statistics for confirmed child abuse did not appear to support the "allegations of endemic child abuse in NT remote communities that was the rationale for the NTER".

The Act was amended four times by the successive Rudd and Gillard governments, and finally repealed in July 2012 by the Gillard government, which later replaced it with the Stronger Futures in the Northern Territory Act 2012, which retains many of the measures.

== Political context ==
The Intervention was introduced during the lead-up to the 2007 federal election, at which the Coalition government led by John Howard since 1996, was defeated. Paul Toohey, writing for The Bulletin, wrote that the policy was poll-driven, although it gained the broad support of the Rudd Labor opposition and some Aboriginal leaders. Analysis of the political arguments that supported the Intervention identified three key factors which allowed easy passage of ensuing legislation. The first was the use of the Little Children are Sacred report. The second was the failure to sufficiently detail the links between the Intervention and the measures combating child sexual abuse. The third was the failure to recognise Aboriginal agency and need for consultation.

As well, the Intervention came at a time of increasing debate over the future of federalism in Australia, in particular the proper extent of federal power into areas of government traditionally managed by the states and territories. It was one of a number of federal interventions enacted in 2007. Other state responsibilities targeted by the Australian Government at the time included seaports, workplace relations, the Murray-Darling river system and public hospitals.

The policy was initially insulated from criticism because of the sensitive nature of the issue and the fact that the national parliament faced (as, in 2023, it still faces) no constitutional barriers to overruling the Northern Territory government. This is in clear contrast to the situation with Australia's state governments, all of which have constitutionally preserved areas of legislative power, against which the federal government is largely powerless to intervene.

== The Intervention timeline ==
The Intervention began with a media release by Mal Brough, Minister for Indigenous Affairs (and chief architect of the Act), on 21 June 2007. The media release served as ministerial regulation to implement a taskforce of eminent Australians, led by Magistrate Sue Gordon, chair of the National Indigenous Council. The role of the Taskforce was to oversee a list of at least 12 measures in the Northern Territory, which included discriminatory changes to welfare, compulsory health checks for all Aboriginal children, the acquisition of Aboriginal townships, and banning alcohol and pornography in prescribed Aboriginal communities. The measures also included increased policing with assistance from other jurisdictions; calling in the army for logistics and surveillance; appointing managers to all government business in designated communities; and improving housing, but establishing market-based rents for public housing.

According to Brough's media release, the implementation of the Taskforce reflected the government response to Ampe Akelyernemane Meke Mekarle, the Little Children are Sacred report, handed to Clare Martin, the Chief Minister of the Northern Territory, on 30 April 2007. The report, the result of the Board of Inquiry into the Protection of Aboriginal Children from Sexual Abuse chaired by Rex Wild and Patricia Anderson, recommended "...that Aboriginal child sexual abuse in the Northern territory be designated as an issue of urgent national significance by both the Australian and Northern Territory Governments". However, only two of 97 recommendations in the report were implemented. The Emergency Response was criticised, but it also received bipartisan parliamentary support.

The Northern Territory National Emergency Response Act 2007, introduced under Howard's fourth term as Prime Minister of Australia, received Royal Assent on 17 August 2007, and amended in September. The 2007 Act was amended four times by the successive Rudd and Gillard governments.

The Rudd government took office in 2007, and twice amended the 2007 Act in 2008. The Labor Party replaced Kevin Rudd with Julia Gillard in 2010 and the Gillard government also made two amendments to the 2007 Act. The first amendment in 2010 introduced by Jenny MacKlin, Indigenous Affairs Minister, ended the suspension of the Racial Discrimination Act 1975. In February 2011, former Howard government minister Brough argued the Intervention had become stagnant and it would not be workable unless it was revitalised.

In April 2011, Opposition Leader Tony Abbott proposed consultation with Indigenous people over a bipartisan Federal Government intervention in Northern Territory towns like Alice Springs, Katherine and Tennant Creek, which would cover such areas as police numbers and school attendance in an effort to address what he described as a "failed state" situation developing in areas of the Northern Territory.

Prime Minister Gillard toured Northern Territory communities in June 2011 and told media "I believe the Intervention has made a difference", citing the provision of meals to children, and better child health and welfare outcomes and a reduction in aggravated assaults, but she said more needed to be done in the provision of housing, and listening to Indigenous voices as input to shaping future policy.

The 2007 Act was repealed on 16 July 2012 by the Gillard government who replaced it with the Stronger Futures in the Northern Territory Act 2012. The 2012 Act remains in force as of December 2020 and retains many of the measures of the 2007 Act.

In the five years the legislation was in place before being repealed, the Department of Families, Housing, Community Services and Indigenous Affairs claims that the total number of people convicted for child sexual assaults in Intervention communities was 45, compared to 25 people in the 5 years before the Act was implemented though these reports were not made available at the time, leading some to doubt the authenticity of the Department's claims.

== Legislation ==
Legislation included:

- the Northern Territory National Emergency Response Act 2007;
- the Social Security and Other Legislation Amendment (Welfare Payment Reform) Act 2007 (still in force as of December 2020);
- the Families, Community Services and Indigenous Affairs and Other Legislation Amendment (Northern Territory National Emergency Response and Other Measures) Act 2007 (still in force as of December 2020);
- the Appropriation (Northern Territory National Emergency Response) Act (No. 1) 2007–2008; and
- the Appropriation (Northern Territory National Emergency Response) Act (No. 2) 2007–2008.

Notably, Clause 132 of the NTNER Act 2007 stated that the provisions of it are classified as "special measures" under the Racial Discrimination Act 1975 and therefore exempt from Part II of the Act. While the main elements of the Intervention were otherwise kept in place, this exemption from provisions of the Racial Discrimination Act was brought to an end in 2010.

== Measures ==
The A$587 million package came into effect with the passage of the Northern Territory National Emergency Response Act 2007 by the Australian Parliament in August 2007. The nine measures contained therein were as follows:

- Deployment of additional police to affected communities.
- New restrictions on alcohol and kava
- Pornography filters on publicly funded computers
- Compulsory acquisition of townships currently held under the title provisions of the Native Title Act 1993 through five-year leases with compensation on a basis other than just terms. (The number of settlements involved remains unclear.)
- Commonwealth funding for provision of community services
- Removal of customary law and cultural practice considerations from bail applications and sentencing within criminal proceedings
- Suspension of the permit system controlling access to Aboriginal communities
- Quarantining of a proportion of welfare benefits to all recipients in the designated communities and of all benefits of those who are judged to have neglected their children
- The abolition of the Community Development Employment Projects (CDEP).

== Reaction and debate ==
Though the plan achieved broad bi-partisan support in the Parliament, it was criticised by the Northern Territory Labor government, the Human Rights and Equal Opportunity Commission and by several Aboriginal leaders and community spokespeople. The plan was also given strong support by other community groups and Aboriginal leaders.

The Australian Human Rights Commission's Social Justice Report 2008 said that, despite the likelihood of under-reporting, the 2005–2006 ABS statistics for confirmed child abuse did not appear to support the "allegations of endemic child abuse in NT remote communities that was the rationale for the NTER".

=== Pretext ===
The use of sexual abuse as the catalyst for the Intervention has been subject to debate. One view is that sexual abuse is a Trojan horse for other purposes such as regaining government control over disputed land.

=== Racial Discrimination Act ===
The measures of the response which have attracted most criticism comprise the exemption from the Racial Discrimination Act 1975, the compulsory acquisition of an unspecified number of prescribed communities (Measure 5) and the partial abolition of the permit system (Measure 10). These have been interpreted as undermining important principles and parameters established as part of the legal recognition of indigenous land rights in Australia.

In 2010, James Anaya, a United Nations Special Rapporteur, found the Emergency Response to be racially discriminating and infringe on the human rights of Aboriginal people in the Northern Territory. Anaya acknowledged that emergency action was needed but said that measures like banning alcohol and pornography and quarantining a percentage of welfare income for the purchase of essential goods represented a limitation on "individual autonomy".

Organisations such as Australians for Native Title and Reconciliation (ANTaR) have argued that breaching the Racial Discrimination Act is not necessary in order to protect the children in the affected areas.

=== Consultation ===
More generally, a lack of consultation with Aboriginal community leaders is often cited by critics of the response, alongside the fact that the action addresses very few of the specific recommendations contained in the Little Children are Sacred Report, while introducing many measures not suggested in the Report.

While finding some support among organisations like the Australian Greens, Anaya's Report was widely condemned in Australia, with the Rudd government's Indigenous Affairs Minister, Jenny Macklin, saying that her duty to protect the rights of children was paramount. Opposition Spokesman Tony Abbott queried whether Anaya had adequately consulted with people who had lived through the Intervention; Indigenous activist Warren Mundine said the report should be "binned" and Central Australian Aboriginal leader Bess Price criticised the UN for not sending a female reporter and said that Anaya had been led around by opponents of the intervention to meet with opponents of the intervention.

=== Criticism ===
The Intervention in the Northern Territory came under fire by a variety of groups. Claims made by critics of the Intervention are as follows:

- In 1999, a report titled Violence in Indigenous Communities was prepared by Dr Paul Memmott, but was suppressed until 2001 and not acted upon.
- An inter-governmental summit on violence and child abuse was held in 2006. This pointed to the cost and blame shifting that characterised federal-territory and state relations, but no further action was taken.
- The United Nations expressed concern over the suspension of the Racial Discrimination Act, writing to Prime Minister Kevin Rudd in March 2009 following a complaint made to the UN by a collective of Aboriginal communities.

A delegation of Northern Territory Aboriginal leaders met with the UN High Commissioner for Human Rights, Navi Pillay, at Charles Darwin University in May 2011. The delegation stated that the situation had deteriorated under the Intervention. There is greater discrimination against them, Ms Pillay said they told her. Firstly, they said there's been an intervention and it started off badly without them being consulted, and secondly, there is insufficient respect for their land, she said. The delegation said Aboriginal people were under pressure from the Gillard government to sign leases over land they already own. They see that as a land grab, Ms Pillay said.

An analysis into the speeches and arguments made by the then Prime Minister and Minister for Indigenous Affairs found that the rhetoric used justified the government's extensive and contentious Intervention into the remote Indigenous communities. The speech acts implied that the Ministers were the heroes of the situation. However, it has since been documented by several sources that some of the verifying sources that instigated the events of the Intervention were fabricated by then-minister Mal Brough and coercive in nature. The rhetoric implied that the communities were helpless and incapable of responding to their own issues. By doing so, the Ministers justified ignoring the recommendations of the Little Children are Sacred report.

=== Support ===
Some Aboriginal commentators and activists, including Noel Pearson, Marcia Langton, and Bess Price, offered support, criticising aspects of the response while believing it to be necessary and worthwhile. Galarrwuy Yunupingu initially supported the response, but by 2010 had lost faith in it.

Writing in February 2008, Aboriginal academic Marcia Langton rejected arguments that the Intervention had been a "political ploy" and argued that the policy in fact marked the death of a "wrong-headed male Aboriginal ideology"; that it was the "inevitable outcome of the many failures of policy and the flawed federal-state division of responsibilities for Aboriginal Australians".

In 2011, after more than three years of the Intervention, Central Australian Indigenous leader Bess Price told ABC television that she had seen progress: among women, who could now "speak for themselves", as well as children and young people.

== Legacy ==
In 2017, a study by researchers at the Menzies School of Health Research in Darwin and the School of Economics at the University of Sydney reported that the income management scheme introduced as part of the Response was found to have a negative impact on children, with reduced school attendance and lower birth weights of infants.

After the Response formally ended in 2012, the subsequent Stronger Futures policy kept restrictions on alcohol in place for some remote communities until 2022, at which point the Northern Territory Government and individual communities were granted more authority to choose whether to keep alcohol restrictions in place. In November 2022, reports emerged of increased levels of alcohol-related harm in Central Australia and violent crime in Alice Springs. In early 2023, the Territory Government responded by introducing new partial alcohol restrictions in Alice Springs, followed by the reintroduction of blanket bans on alcohol for Aboriginal communities. Youth crime remained an issue in Alice Springs, leading to the enforcement of curfews in 2024.

The Intervention also informed steps taken towards reconciliation. The 2017 Uluru Statement from the Heart, which called for an Indigenous Voice to Parliament, was described by Stan Grant as something that "spoke for those silent voices of the 2007 intervention". However, those who endorsed the Response went on to influence public debate on the Voice to Parliament. The aforementioned Bess Price was "ostracised from her community" due to her support of the Intervention, and she and her family "gravitated towards conservative politics". Price's daughter, Jacinta Nampijinpa Price, won a seat in the Australian Senate in 2022, expressed opposition to the Voice in her maiden speech, and supported the resumption of alcohol bans in September 2022. She was regarded as the key figure in influencing the National Party to publicly oppose the Voice in November 2022. When their Coalition partner, the Liberal Party, adopted the same position several months later, the "Yes" campaign in the 2023 Australian Indigenous Voice referendum lacked bipartisan support, which was a major factor in its eventual defeat.

== See also ==
- Breaking the silence NSW
- Emergency management
- Little Children Are Sacred report
- Our Generation
- Outstation movement
- Stronger Futures policy
- Sustainable tourism
