= Little Children are Sacred =

Report by an Australian child sex abuse inquiry

Little Children are Sacred (Eastern Arrernte: Ampe Akelyernemane Meke Mekarle) is the report of a Board of Inquiry into the Protection of Aboriginal Children from Sexual Abuse, chaired by Rex Wild and Patricia Anderson. Commissioned by the government of the Northern Territory, Australia, the report was publicly released on 15 June 2007.

== Background and description ==
The inquiry into the Protection of Aboriginal Children from Sexual Abuse, chaired by former Director of Public Prosecutions for the Northern Territory Rex Wild and human rights advocate Pat Anderson was established in August 2006 and investigated ways to protect Aboriginal children from sexual abuse. The report was publicly released on 15 June 2007, the latest commissioned by the Australian government to investigate this topic. The first report that raised public attention was written by Janet Stanley in 2003.

The report, entitled Ampe Akelyernemane Meke Mekarle: "Little Children are Sacred", known commonly as the Little Children are Sacred report, concluded that neglect of children in Aboriginal communities had reached crisis levels, demanding that it "be designated as an issue of urgent national significance by both the Australian and Northern Territory governments".

=== Recommendations ===
The Little Children are Sacred report makes 97 recommendations regarding alcohol restrictions, the provision of healthcare and many other issues relating to child abuse and neglect in regional Aboriginal communities. The first two recommendations are:

1. That Aboriginal child sexual abuse in the Northern Territory be designated as an issue of urgent national significance by both the Australian and Northern Territory Governments, and both governments immediately establish a collaborative partnership, with a Memorandum of Understanding to specifically address the protection of Aboriginal children from sexual abuse. It is critical that both governments commit to genuine consultation with Aboriginal people in designing initiatives for Aboriginal communities.
2. That while everybody has a responsibility for the protection of all children, the Northern Territory Government must provide strong leadership on this issue, and that this be expressed publicly as a determined commitment to place children’s interests at the forefront in all policy and decision-making, particularly where a matter impacts on the physical and emotional wellbeing of children. Further, because of the special disadvantage to which the Aboriginal people of the Northern Territory are subject, particular regard needs to be given to the situation of Aboriginal children.

== Response ==
The Australian Government was accused of misinterpreting the significance in the distinction between neglect and abuse, a misunderstanding which led to their Northern Territory National Emergency Response, also known as The Intervention, or NTER, on 21 June 2007 (which was in turn replaced by the Stronger Futures Policy of 2011).

The Clare Martin Northern Territory government denied inaction on its part, and released its detailed response, Closing the Gap of Indigenous Disadvantage: Generational Plan of Action in August 2007.

The Howard government took few of the report's recommendations and particularly went against the advice given that action should not be "centralised," but "local". Quoting Fred Chaney, the report stipulates that:

- "And one of the things I think we should have learned by now is that you can’t solve these things by centralised bureaucratic direction. You can only educate children in a school at the place where they live. You can only give people jobs or get people into employment person by person. And I think my own view now is that the lesson we’ve learned is that you need locally based action, local resourcing, local control to really make changes.
- "But I think governments persist in thinking you can direct from Canberra, you can direct from Perth or Sydney or Melbourne, that you can have programs that run out into communities that aren’t owned by those communities, that aren’t locally controlled and managed, and I think surely that is a thing we should know doesn’t work.
- "So I am very much in favour of a model which I suppose builds local control in communities as the best of those Native Title agreements do, as has been done in the Argyle Diamond Mine Agreement, as is being done in Kununurra. Not central bureaucracies trying to run things in Aboriginal communities. That doesn’t work.
- "They’re locked into systems which require central accounting, which require centralised rules and regulations. They’re not locally tailored. The great thing about working with a mining company in an Aboriginal community is that the mining company has the flexibility to manage towards outcomes locally with that community.
- "The great thing about the education projects in which I’m involved is that we can manage locally for the outcomes that we want to achieve locally. Once you try and do it by remote control, through visiting ministers and visiting bureaucrats fly in, fly out – forget it".

The government received much criticism for the reaction to this crisis, with many viewing the responses as a political manoeuvre. It has also been said that the government's Intervention was no more than another attempt to control the Indigenous community.

The Australian Human Rights Commission's Social Justice Report 2008 said that, despite the likelihood of under-reporting, the 2005−2006 ABS statistics for confirmed child abuse did not appear to support the "allegations of endemic child abuse in NT remote communities that was the rationale for the NTER".

== See also ==
- Breaking the silence NSW
- Northern Territory National Emergency Response
- Stronger Futures Policy
- Our Generation (2010 film)
- Utopia, a documentary by John Pilger
