= Laurence Breuls =

Australian actor

- Occupation: Actor
- Years active: 1995–current
- Known for: Home and Away; Blackrock

Laurence Breuls is an Australian actor.

== Career ==
Breuls made his television debut portraying the character Nelson McFarlane on Home and Away in 1995, and his film debut playing the lead role of Jared in the 1997 film Blackrock. Breuls' performance in Blackrock was praised by David Rooney from Variety, who said Breuls "kept his intensity cranked to just the right level, making it easy to empathize with the character."

== Filmography ==
=== Film ===
Year	Title	Role	Notes
1997	Blackrock	Jared	
1999	Kick	Steve	
2000	Marriage Acts	Michael McKinnon	TV film
2006	Suburban Mayhem	Danny	
2006	The Marine	Fran	
2007	Ghost Rider	Gressil	
2007	Joanne Lees: Murder in the Outback	Peter Falconio	TV film
2008	Mockingbird	Sam	Short film
2015	Injury Time	James Moody	Short film

=== Television ===
Year	Title	Role	Notes
1995	Home and Away	Nelson McFarlane	35 episodes
1995–1997	Spellbinder	Smithy	4 episodes
1997; 2000	Water Rats	Jeremy Carter / Enrico Ranzolin	2 episodes
1998	All Saints	Scott Chambers	2 episodes
1998	State Coroner	David Randell	1 episode
2003	White Collar Blue	Jason Deekes	1 episode
2009	City Homicide	Ricky Sterling	1 episode
2009	My Place	Jack	1 episode
2010	The Pacific	1st Lt. Larkin	1 episode
