= Bradley John Murdoch =

Australian murderer (1958–2025)

- Born: 19 February 1958; Geraldton, Western Australia, Australia
- Died: 15 July 2025 (aged 67); Alice Springs, Northern Territory, Australia
- Occupations: Mechanic; Truck driver
- Height: 6 ft 5 in (1.96 m)
- Convictions: Murder; Deprivation of liberty Aggravated unlawful assault
- Penalty: Life imprisonment 28-year non-parole period

Bradley John Murdoch (19 February 1958 – 15 July 2025) was an Australian criminal who served a sentence of life imprisonment for the July 2001 murder of English backpacker Peter Falconio in Australia. Murdoch was held in Darwin Correctional Centre in Darwin, Northern Territory. He lodged two appeals against his conviction, both of which were unsuccessful. He was forbidden to talk to the press.

== Early life ==
Murdoch was born on 19 February 1958 in Geraldton, Western Australia, an unexpected third son (the others were aged 11 and 14) to parents Colin Murdoch, a mechanic, and Nancy Murdoch, a hairdresser. The family lived in nearby Northampton, before moving to Perth when he was 12 years old. Murdoch had problems adjusting to city life and soon became involved with a biker gang.

At 15 years old, he left high school and moved back to Geraldton, where he started becoming involved in biker gang criminal activities. He also had his own trucking business, but declared bankruptcy in 1983. In 1980, he met his partner Dianne, whom he married in July 1984. They had a son, but they were separated by 1986 due to Murdoch's domestic violence. He was then employed as a truck driver, and illicit-drug smuggler; he subsequently admitted in court to smuggling large amounts of cannabis. He also began to display white supremacist tendencies, particularly in the wake of the 1992 Mabo decision, alongside getting a racist tattoo. By 1998, after release from prison, he was living in Derby, running drugs and driving road trains. He later resettled in Broome and running drugs to Sedan, South Australia.

== Previous criminal charges ==
- In 1980, aged 22, Murdoch received a suspended sentence after being convicted of causing death by dangerous driving, after hitting and killing a motorcyclist at Port Pirie in South Australia.
- In November 1995, Murdoch started a 21-month imprisonment for the 20 August 1995 drunken incident of shooting at people who were celebrating at an indigenous Australian rules football grand-final match at Fitzroy Crossing in the Kimberley region of Western Australia.
- In 2003 Murdoch was charged with two counts of raping a 12-year-old girl, two counts of indecently assaulting the girl's mother, and two counts of false imprisonment. Prosecutors alleged that Murdoch had bound, gagged and handcuffed the girl before raping her and loading her into the back of his four-wheel drive. The court heard that he was armed with a gun in a shoulder holster, and abducted the mother and daughter from their property in the Riverland "as insurance" because he was on the run from police trying to frame him for Falconio's murder. Jurors heard that when he released them in Port Augusta, Murdoch told the victims he was heading to Western Australia to kill a man and then shoot himself. The jury returned a majority verdict of not guilty for two counts of rape, two counts of indecent assault, two counts of false imprisonment and one count of common assault. After the acquittal, Murdoch was immediately arrested over the Falconio killing.

== Peter Falconio trial and incarceration ==
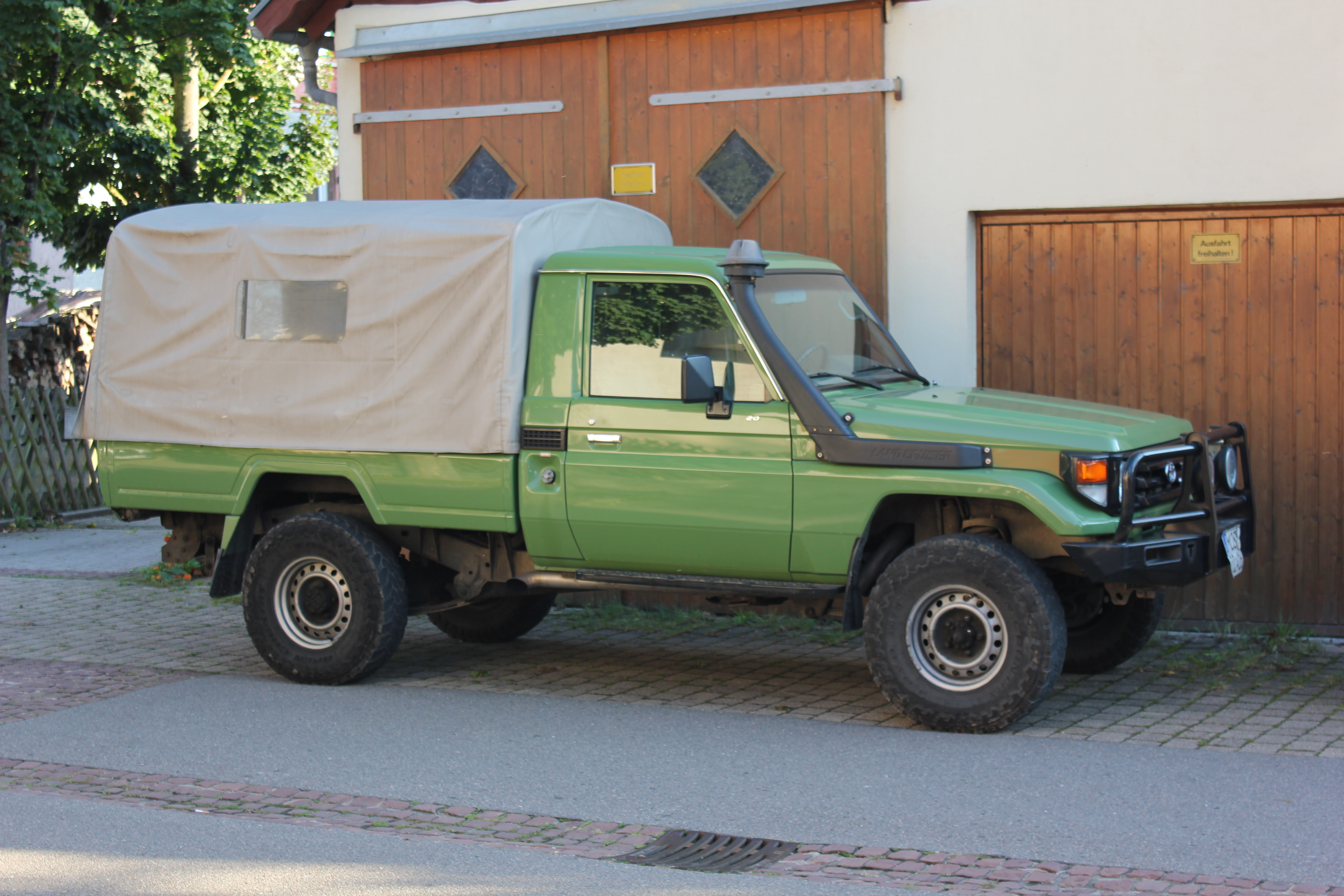
A Toyota Land Cruiser ute with canopy similar to the one used by Murdoch

Shortly after his acquittal for unrelated rape and abduction charges, Murdoch was arrested in 2003 and charged with the murder of Peter Falconio on a remote part of the Stuart Highway near Barrow Creek on 14 July 2001. The case was heard before the Supreme Court of the Northern Territory in Darwin, and began on 17 October 2005. Murdoch pleaded not guilty to charges of murdering Peter Falconio and assaulting and attempting to kidnap Falconio's girlfriend Joanne Lees. Murdoch was convicted on 13 December 2005 of Falconio's murder. He was sentenced to life imprisonment with a non-parole period of 28 years. He was also convicted of other assault-related charges on Joanne Lees.

On 12 December 2006, Murdoch appealed against his sentence in the Northern Territory Supreme Court, claiming the evidence of Lees was tainted because she had seen a photograph of him on the internet before she was interviewed by police, as well as an article linking him to the murder. The appeal was dismissed on 10 January 2007. An appeal to the High Court of Australia was unsuccessful; the court refused special leave to appeal on 21 June 2007. In mid-August 2007, some sections of the Australian media speculated that Murdoch might soon reveal the whereabouts of Falconio's remains. Specifically, the press mentioned that Murdoch did not enjoy the conditions in Berrimah Prison, on the outskirts of Darwin, and might reveal the location of Falconio's body in exchange for a transfer to a prison in Western Australia, given that all avenues of appeal had been exhausted. He launched another appeal to the Northern Territory criminal court of appeal in 2013; the appeal was later withdrawn by his lawyers in March 2014.

In June 2020, a four-part documentary TV series was broadcast on the UK's TV Channel 4 entitled Murder in the Outback: The Falconio and Lees Mystery.

=== Illness and death ===
Murdoch was diagnosed with terminal throat cancer in 2019 and received chemotherapy at Alice Springs Hospital.

On 24 June 2025, it was announced that Murdoch had been released from prison into palliative care at that same hospital, where he was allowed out on excursions in his dying days. Murdoch died there on 15 July 2025, aged 67.

It was later revealed that Murdoch was visited by Northern Territory Police Force officers at the hospital a few days after his move to palliative care, where a last-ditch attempt was made to get him to confess to where he had hidden Peter Falconio's body. However, Murdoch gruffly dismissed the officers and maintained he had nothing to do with Falconio's murder.
