= Murder of Peter Falconio =

2001 murder and attempted kidnap in the Australian Outback

- Location: 21.453294°S 133.926957°E; Stuart Highway, near Barrow Creek, Northern Territory, Australia
- Date: 14 July 2001; 19:30 ACST (UTC+09:30)
- Injuries: Joanne Lees (victim's girlfriend)
- Victim: Peter Falconio
- Charges: Murder (Falconio); Assault, attempted kidnapping (Lees)
- Verdict: Guilty
- Convicted: Bradley John Murdoch
- Judge: Brian Ross Martin

Peter Falconio was a British tourist who disappeared, and is presumed murdered, after being attacked on a remote roadside of the Australian Outback near Barrow Creek while travelling with his girlfriend Joanne Lees, who escaped an attempted kidnapping during the same incident.

In the aftermath of the backpacker murders, the case quickly attracted considerable public and legal attention both domestically and worldwide. Falconio was 28 years old at the time of the disappearance. Though his body has never been found, he is presumed dead. On 13 December 2005, Bradley John Murdoch was convicted of Falconio's murder and sentenced to life imprisonment.

== Background ==
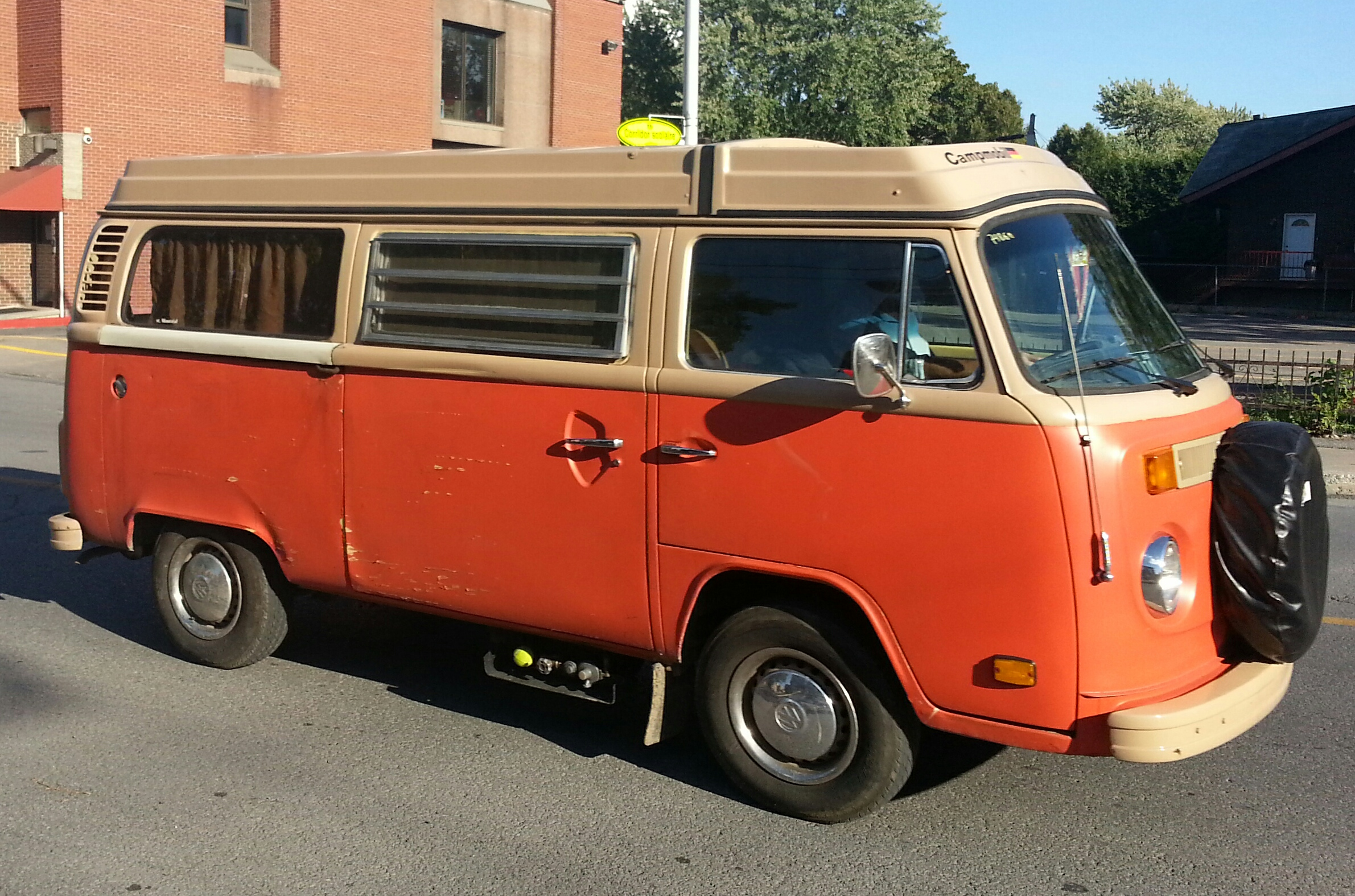
An orange Volkswagen T2 Kombi Camper van similar to the one used by Falconio and Lees

Peter Marco Falconio (born 20 September 1972) was the third of four sons in a family who lived in Hepworth, West Riding of Yorkshire, England, United Kingdom. In June 1996, he started a relationship with Joanne Lees (born 1973) after meeting her in a Huddersfield nightclub. The following year both moved to the south coast of England when Falconio began studying construction management at the University of Brighton, while Lees worked as a travel agent in nearby Hove.

On 15 November 2000, the couple embarked on a trip to Nepal, Singapore, Malaysia, Thailand, Cambodia and Australia. The recent news of the backpacker murders, the Port Arthur massacre, and the Childers Palace Backpackers Hostel fire had made their families anxious about the final leg of this trip. By 16 January 2001, the couple had arrived in Sydney on a working holiday visa and spent the next few months earning money to fund the next stage of their trip, with Lees working in a bookshop and Falconio at an office furniture company.

On 25 June 2001, the couple drove to Melbourne in an orange Kombi camper van, with the intention to travel up the center of the Australian Outback and finish their journey in Darwin. Falconio and Lees took turns driving the van and slept in the back of it while parked overnight on roadside lay-bys, and by the night of 13 July 2001 they had reached Alice Springs.

== Day of attack ==
On the afternoon of Saturday 14 July 2001, Falconio and Lees ate lunch at Red Rooster restaurant before heading north at around 4pm on the Stuart Highway, with Lees driving and Falconio sleeping in the back of the van. At around 6:30pm they stopped at Ti-Tree to buy fuel and shared a joint of cannabis while watching the sun set, then continued their journey towards the Devil's Marbles with Falconio driving. Around 7:30 pm, Falconio and Lees had been conscious of a car that had been following them for the previous 10 kilometers since they drove through Barrow Creek, and were expecting to be overtaken. However, when the vehicle – a white Toyota 4WD with a green canopy – drew alongside, the driver gestured excitedly at them to pull over. Lees noticed the interior light was on in the Toyota and a dog was sitting in the passenger seat. Despite her reservations, Falconio stopped the van and went to speak with the man, who had pulled off the road behind them. The man, who Lees later described as a tall middle aged Australian with a horseshoe moustache, explained to Falconio that he had seen sparks shooting out of the van's exhaust pipe. Leaving the Kombi engine running, the two men went to investigate the exhaust, and Lees moved into the driver's seat ready to rev the engine. As the interior light of the Kombi was illuminated, Lees' night vision was degraded and she could not see what was going on at the rear of the vehicle.

She revved the engine on Falconio's command and then heard a loud bang from the rear of the van, which she thought was the engine backfiring, and moments later the man was at the driver side door brandishing a silver handgun. The gunman climbed into the van and pushed Lees over to the passenger side, and after pressing the gun to her head secured her hands behind her back with black cable ties. The man then pushed her out onto the hard shoulder and attempted to bind her legs with cable ties, but fearing a potential rape Lees fought back violently until the man struck her in the head. She was then dragged to the Toyota and forced in the rear compartment, where a hood was placed over her head. Lees eventually managed to quietly slip out of the rear tailgate and flee approximately 60 meters into the bush while the gunman was distracted (apparently while moving Falconio's body). The gunman searched for Lees with his dog, passing nearby three times, before driving off in a southern direction. A short while later she heard gravel crunching and realised he had returned, before a vehicle engine started and again headed south. Lees remained hidden for several hours before manoeuvring her bound hands in front of her body and finally flagging down road train driver Vince Millar at around 1:00 am. Millar removed Lees' cable ties with a pair of bolt cutters, and after being informed the man who attacked her was armed decided it was safer to drive to Barrow Creek and raise the alarm rather than search for Falconio.

== Investigation ==
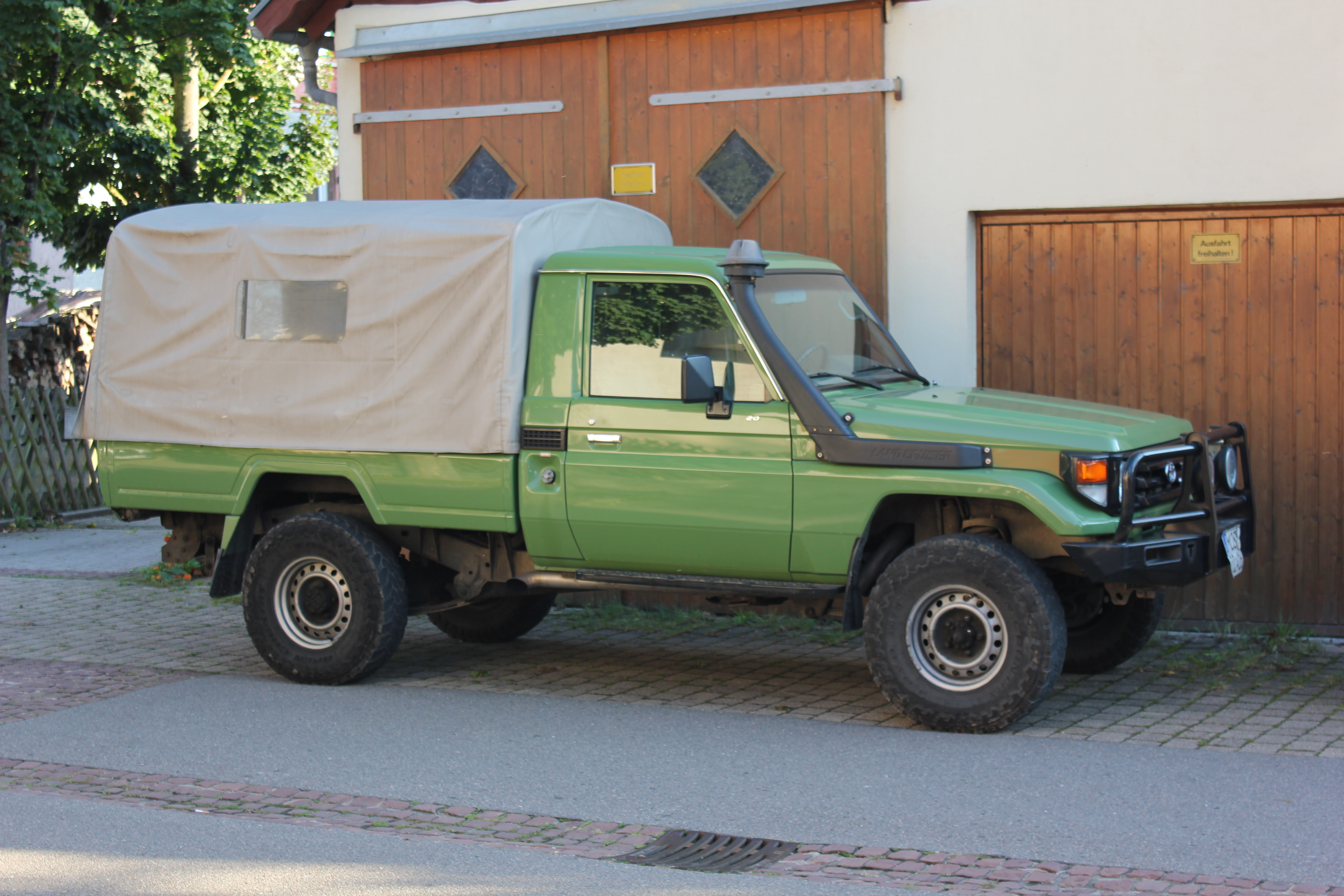
A Toyota Land Cruiser pick-up/ute with canopy similar to the one used by Bradley Murdoch

The Alice Springs Police were called around 1:30 am, arrived to collect evidence and testimonies at around 4:20 am, and (accompanied by the road train driver) commenced a search for Falconio, the Toyota, and the gunman at 7:00 am. Returning to the scene, they found a dirt-covered pool of blood on the edge of the asphalt covered road. Searching around one kilometer to the south of the crime scene, officers located the couple's Kombi hidden some 100 metres into the bush. It was not until eight hours after the rescue that roadblocks were put in place on the twelve likely roads exiting the district. Police searches of the area in the following months revealed little except Lees' footprints. Four Aboriginal trackers arrived from a nearby settlement within a few days but none of them found evidence of either Falconio or the gunman. In early August 2001, the Northern Territory Police Force released CCTV footage of a man who had stopped his white Toyota four wheel drive at an Alice Springs service station to buy fuel and supplies at 12:45am on the night in question, who they believed was connected to the attack on Falconio and Lees.

Given the unusual nature of the attack, and the lack of corroborating evidence (i.e., Falconio's belongings or body), it took the police some days to appreciate the significance of the crime. But in the wake of the backpacker case, the media were quick to sensationalise Lees' story as one of survival in a crime of unusual horror against all odds. However, inconsistencies in Lees' statements and her demeanour in the following weeks shifted attention to the veracity of her version of the incident (e.g. the perpetrator's facial composite, the type of vehicle or dog, and assumed CCTV footage of the suspect from a service station in Alice Springs), similar to what had happened in the Azaria Chamberlain case. A $250,000 reward was offered, but the only new evidence was an unidentified male-DNA trace on Lees' T-shirt, and some related DNA on the cable ties and Kombi gearstick.

Police were hopeful that the release of the CCTV footage would lead to the person shown coming forward to remove themselves from suspicion. When this did not happen, investigators began to focus on the vehicle the man was driving, which was identified as a 1991–1999 model Toyota Land Cruiser. The fact the man bought diesel fuel allowed detectives to narrow the search to a HZJ75 model, and a list of registered owners was cross referenced with the names of thirty-six men whom anonymous callers had identified in the footage. Based on these results, police interviewed Bradley John Murdoch at his apartment in Broome on 1 November 2001, though Lees' descriptions did not immediately connect the case to him and no DNA sample was collected. Murdoch also had an alibi that placed him in Broome at 4am on 16 July 2001, and detectives thought it unlikely he could have travelled the near 2000 kilometer distance in the 27 hours from the sighting at the Alice Springs service station.

On 17 May 2002, investigators caught Murdoch's drug-running accomplice James Hepi in possession of 4 kilograms of cannabis after an anonymous tipoff. In return for a reduced sentence, Hepi provided information about Murdoch's suspicious behaviour around the time of Falconio's murder, such as shaving off his long hair and mustache along with dramatically modifying his Toyota 4WD. Detectives also obtained a DNA sample from Murdoch's older brother in early August 2002, however he then phoned Murdoch to warn him police were investigating his involvement. Murdoch then went on the run, but on 22 August 2002 he was arrested and then charged with unrelated kidnap and sexual assault offences by South Australia Police.

In early October 2002, while being held on remand at Yatala Labour Prison in the northern suburbs of Adelaide, Murdoch was questioned by detectives in the presence of his lawyer regarding Falconio's murder after his DNA matched samples recovered from the crime scene, however he exercised his right to silence and refused to answer any questions. A few weeks later, Murdoch was officially designated the prime suspect and an arrest warrant was issued by Northern Territory police. On 11 November 2003, Murdoch was found not guilty by majority verdict at the District Court of South Australia in relation to counts of rape, false imprisonment, and indecent assault against a 12-year-old girl and her mother. Murdoch was then promptly re-arrested on an interstate warrant for the murder of Peter Falconio.

== Murder trial ==
After extradition, a committal hearing began in April 2005. The trial began on 17 October of that year before the Supreme Court of the Northern Territory in Darwin. To cope with the demands of the trial and the huge media contingent covering the proceedings, the court building in Darwin was renovated at a cost of A$900,000. The judge was Brian Ross Martin QC, Chief Justice of the Northern Territory. Murdoch pleaded not guilty to charges of murdering Falconio and assaulting and attempting to kidnap Lees.

=== Prosecution evidence ===
Prosecutor Rex Wild Q.C. narrated to the court how on the night in question a man driving a white pick up truck stopped Falconio and Lees campervan to say he has seen sparks emitting from its exhaust pipe. While the man and Falconio went to the rear to investigate, Lees revved the engine, after which she heard a loud noise, when suddenly the man appeared at the open drivers side door and pointed a revolver at Lees. The man then restrained Lees with homemade handcuffs made from cable ties and threw her into the back of his truck. Lees managed to escape and hide in the bush, before being rescued several hours later by passing truck drivers. A later search of the area found a large pool of Falconio's blood which had been covered over with soil, and he was missing presumed murdered by the authorities. Eyewitness Jasper Haines told the court how he was driving in the area on the night of the attack and had seen a large white vehicle, possibly Toyota Land Cruiser with a green canopy, parked at the side of Stuart Highway beside an orange campervan. Forensic experts testified that no bullet fragments or bodily tissue were found at the crime scene, which suggested a low powered cartridge such as a .22 short was fired into Falconio's head and did not produce an exit wound. The court heard from several witnesses that Murdoch owned a silver .22 caliber revolver and often carried it in his truck while traveling cross country.

Lees had identified Murdoch from police photographs shown to her in November 2002 and finally face-to-face during the trial on 18 October. She also told the court that her assailant tied her wrists together behind her then attempted to bind her legs, and when she fought back he punched her in the head. The man then frog-marched her into his ute (pickup truck) and put a sack over her head, stating that the person forced her between the seats of and into the rear of his vehicle. He told her to be quiet or he would shoot her. Lees said she escaped from the ute and fled into the dark, hiding under bushes approximately 60 meters from the road, while Murdoch and his dog tried to find her using a flash light. He eventually gave up, and Lees heard him dragging an object over the roadside gravel before driving away. Lees waited several hours before plucking up the courage to try flag down a passing vehicle, and eventually was rescued by a road train driver. Teddy Egan, an Aboriginal tracker, was involved in the search for Peter Falconio. He confirmed that Joanne Lees had hidden in the bush. Under cross examination, Lees admitted that when the gun was placed to her head the barrel didnt seem to be hot nor could she smell gunpowder, and that when she was dragged into the attacker's vehicle she did not see the dead body of Falconio at the back of their Kombi van.

Sales receipts proved Murdoch bought items at a Repco Auto Parts store in Alice Springs at the same time Falconio and Lees were eating their lunch at Red Rooster restaurant, which was directly across the road from the auto shop. Murdoch was also found to have left Alice Springs at a time and in a direction which were each consistent with him being at or around Barrow Creek at the time of the murder. Expert testimony presented at the trial indicated that he was the man captured in the CCTV footage at the service station at 12:38 am. This indication was later corroborated by Murdoch's own father as well as his drug trafficking accomplice James Helpi. The police found traces of Murdoch's DNA on a pair of homemade handcuffs used in the attack. This, combined with the DNA match on Lees' T-shirt, allowed Murdoch to be charged with the murder. The T-shirt DNA was found to be "150 quadrillion times more likely [to] belong to Murdoch" than anyone else. Low copy number DNA believed to belong to Murdoch was also found on the gearstick of the Kombi in which Falconio and Lees had been travelling, which was subsequently hidden by the perpetrator in the bush. Forensic experts told the court that Murdoch's blood on Lees' T-shirt was smudged, which implied direct contact when wet and ruled out accidental secondary contact from another location or being flicked on from distance.

=== Defence submissions ===
Taking the stand to give evidence in his own defence, Bradley Murdoch admitted he smuggled cannabis from Sedan across the country to Broome and carried firearms (including two revolver pistols) for his own protection, however he denied murdering Falconio and attempting to abduct Lees. Although he was in Alice Springs on the day in question, and claimed to have eaten at the same Red Rooster restaurant as the couple, Murdoch testified he took the Tanami Road westwards towards his hometown of Broome rather than heading north, and was hundreds of kilometres away driving through Yuendumu at the time of the attack. Murdoch also denied keeping one of Lees' hair ties as a "souvenir", while also insisting he was not the man filmed on CCTV at a truck stop in Alice Springs a few hours after the attack. However, when asked why his DNA was found on both Lees' clothing, the cable ties used to restrain her and the inside of the Kombi van, Murdoch could not give an explanation.

Murdoch's defence argued during the trial that the DNA match could have been due to accidental blood transfer from a door frame in an Alice Springs Red Rooster restaurant prior to the alleged offence, or could have been simply planted by persons unknown. Further samples were found to be contaminated and were not presented as evidence. Murdoch gave evidence that he had stopped at the restaurant at around 10:30am on the day in question to buy takeaway roast chicken baguette for himself and chicken nuggets for his dog. During the committal hearing, Lees at one stage mentioned that she and Falconio had stopped at Red Rooster.

Eyewitnesses claimed they had seen Falconio at a petrol station one week after he went missing. Prosecutor Rex Wild QC dismissed these claims, arguing that each account gave conflicting information, in particular about the man's hair colour. He pointed out that the police had followed up various eyewitness accounts, all of which had proven fruitless. Falconio's body has never been found "despite one of the most exhaustive police investigations ever seen in Australia".

=== Verdict ===
On 13 December 2005, Murdoch was found guilty by a jury in a unanimous verdict and he was sentenced to life imprisonment with a non-parole period of twenty-eight years. He was also convicted of other assault-related charges on Lees. Only after the sentencing was it revealed that Murdoch had previously been acquitted of aggravated sexual assault on a mother and daughter in South Australia some years earlier. After the verdict was delivered, Western Australia Police Force announced Murdoch would be investigated in relation to a number of cold cases, such as the Claremont serial killings.

=== Possible motives ===
Although a motive for the attack was never proven, the authorities theorised that Murdoch had first observed Lees from across the road from Red Rooster restaurant and later seen her driving north from Alice Springs while Falconio was asleep in the back of the van, and believing she was alone Murdoch had stopped the vehicle with the intention of raping Lees when he decided to murder Falconio to leave no witnesses. Murdoch had earlier gone on trial for an incident where he abducted and raped a 12 year old girl, which had similarities to the attack on Lees such as binding of the wrists with restraints made from black cable ties. An alternative theory was an amphetamines crazed Murdoch, who at the time was trafficking large amounts of cannabis from Adelaide to the Kimberley region, had spotted the same orange Kombi van on several occasions during his latest drug run and had intended to murder its occupants after becoming paranoid they were following him.

== Appeals ==
On 12 December 2006, Murdoch appealed against his life sentence in the Supreme Court. His lawyers lodged eight grounds of appeal. Murdoch claimed the evidence of Lees was tainted because she had seen a photograph of him on the internet before she was interviewed by police, as well as an article linking him to the murder. On 10 January 2007, the Northern Territory Court of Criminal Appeal (NT CCA) dismissed both limbs of the appeal.

Murdoch then applied for Special Leave to appeal to the High Court of Australia. On 21 June 2007, the High Court refused to grant Special Leave. Under the Australian judicial system, Murdoch had then exhausted all opportunities of appeal. Subsequent to the High Court of Australia refusing to grant his application for Special Leave, there was media speculation that Murdoch would lodge a further appeal. He launched another appeal to the Northern Territory criminal court of appeal in 2013.

== Later developments ==
In April 2006, The Bulletin reported that Murdoch had refused to be served chicken while incarcerated during the committal and trial, claiming he was allergic to it, and that he had a standing medical certificate at Darwin's maximum security Berrimah Prison where he had a "prison dietitian assigned to create a special menu" due to this allergy, requesting that he never be served chicken. This contradicted his defence at trial that his DNA might have been transferred onto Lees' clothing while buying chicken for himself and his dog at an Alice Springs Red Rooster restaurant.

In mid-August 2007, some sections of the Australian media speculated that Murdoch might soon reveal the whereabouts of Falconio's remains. Specifically, the press mentioned that Murdoch did not enjoy the conditions of the Berrimah Prison and might reveal the location of the body in exchange for a transfer to a prison in Western Australia, given that all avenues of appeal had been exhausted. Murdoch himself spoke out against this idea.

Author Keith Allan Noble insists Murdoch was innocent and offered a reward of £25,000 to anyone who can prove that Falconio is still alive. His 2011 book Find! Falconio outlines what he describes as "the show trial in which the jury was lied to and pressure-cooked resulting in a shocking miscarriage of justice". Noble's writings, which also cover the Port Arthur massacre, have been described by several journalists as conspiracy theories.

In April 2017, the NT News received an anonymous letter claiming that Murdoch had "cut [Falconio]'s body up" and placed it in two large bags. The letter claimed that an associate was asked to dissolve the remains in acid and dispose of them in the Swan River in Perth, but the associate had instead gone past Geraldton and buried the bags unopened in remote Western Australia. The NT News forwarded the letter to Northern Territory Police, who said they were reviewing the letter.

In June 2025, Australian police announced a reward of $500,000 for information leading to the discovery of Falconio's remains, ahead of the 24th anniversary of his murder in July.

After being diagnosed with terminal throat cancer in 2019, Murdoch was transferred from prison to palliative care at Alice Springs Hospital on 24 June 2025. He died there on 15 July, aged 67, never having revealed the location of Falconio's remains.

It was later revealed that Murdoch was visited by Northern Territory Police Force officers at the hospital a few days after his move to palliative care, where a last-ditch attempt was made to get him to confess to where he had hidden Peter Falconio's body. However, Murdoch gruffly dismissed the officers and maintained he had nothing to do with Falconio's murder.

== Media ==
In 2005, while Murdoch's trial was still under way, the film Wolf Creek was released in Australia. As the film was marketed as being "based on true events", the Northern Territory court placed an injunction on its release within the Territory in the belief that it could influence the outcome of the proceedings. However, the movie was inspired by other murders around Australia, such as the murders committed by Ivan Milat, as well as the Falconio case.

Lees agreed to a televised interview with Martin Bashir which was later televised in Australia, for which she was paid £50,000. She later testified in court that she had agreed to the interview to raise awareness of Falconio's murder in Australia, as she felt the public profile of the case had diminished.

Lees wrote No Turning Back, a book about her life. She went to England for the launch of the book in October 2006 and a serialisation appeared in The Times newspaper on 2 and 3 October. On 10 October 2006, Lees was interviewed by BBC News 24.

In March 2007, Australia's Channel Ten presented a docudrama covering the murder and trial from Lees' perspective, entitled Joanne Lees: Murder in the Outback. The roles of Lees and Falconio were played by Joanne Froggatt and Laurence Breuls, respectively. It was also shown by ITV1 in the United Kingdom on 8 April 2007, by TV One in New Zealand on 10 June 2007, and by RTL 2 in Germany on 12 January 2009. The case was also covered by Casefile True Crime Podcast on 28 January 2017.

In June 2020, Channel 4 in the UK and Australia's Channel Seven broadcast a four-part documentary series entitled Murder in the Outback: The Falconio and Lees Mystery.

== See also ==
- List of solved missing person cases (2000s)

== Bibliography ==
- And then the Darkness (2005) by Sue Williams ISBN 0733312969
- Where's Peter? (2005) by Roger Maynard ISBN 0732281679
- No Turning Back (2007) by Joanne Lees ISBN 034092442X
- Bloodstain (2011) by Richard Shears ASIN B00RWOV8G2
- Find! Falconio (2012) by Keith Allan Noble ISBN 3950313613
- Dead Centre (2020) by Robin Bowles ISBN 1863254048
