= Arbouet =

Arbouet may refer to:

- Arbouet-Sussaute, a commune in south-western France
- Kevin Arbouet (born 1977), American film director
