= Moger =

Moger is a surname. Notable people with the surname include:

- Calum Von Moger (born 1990), Australian bodybuilder
- Gabriel Móger (c. 1379 – c. 1439), Majorcan artist
- Harry Moger (1879–1927), English football player
- Philip Moger (born 1955), British Roman Catholic prelate
- Sandy Moger (born 1969), Canadian ice hockey player
- Susan Moger (born 1942), American author
