= The Hurt Business =

The Hurt Business may refer to:

- The Hurt Business (film), 2016 documentary film
- The Hurt Syndicate, professional wrestling stable currently wrestle in All Elite Wrestling formerly known as The Hurt Business in WWE
