= The Vladar Company =

Film production and distribution company based in New York City

- Company type: Private Corporation
- Industry: Entertainment; Movie studio
- Founded: 2008
- Founder: Vlad Yudin; Edwin Mejia
- Headquarters: New York, NY, United States
- Key people: Vlad Yudin, (Partner); Edwin Mejia, (Partner)
- Products: Motion pictures, television programs
- Divisions: VDN (Digital Publishing); Vladar Vision; Vladar International; Generation Iron Fitness Network
- Website: vladar.com

The Vladar Company is a film production and distribution company, led by Vlad Yudin and Edwin Mejia. Founded in 2008, the company has focused on content creation to cater to market's growing need for multi-cultural and inspirational entertainment content across multiple platforms. The company focuses on developing, financing and packaging films with its producing partners at leading Hollywood and International production studios.

== Production company ==
Vladar's film production remains the largest division of The Vladar Company. They have produced four feature films since 2008 and have multiple projects currently in production. Their most recent release, Generation Iron, opened with a weekend box office total of $245,000, making it the biggest documentary opening of 2013. It opened to positive reviews, currently holding an 80% on review aggregator Rotten Tomatoes.

=== Film releases ===
US release	Title	Genre	Director	Notes
July 24, 2008	Big Pun: The Legacy	Documentary	Vlad Yudin	distributed by EMI and Universal Home Video
October 24, 2009	Last Day of Summer	Comedy/Drama	Vlad Yudin	distributed by Entertainment One
February, 2011	Mr. Immortality: The Life and Times of Twista	Documentary	Vlad Yudin	Distributed by Entertainment One and Cinetic
July 21, 2013	Head Smash: The Prequel	Animation/Short	Vlad Yudin	
September 20, 2013	Generation Iron	Documentary	Vlad Yudin	Distributed by Vladar Vision
2015	Catskill Park	Horror/Sci-fi	Vlad Yudin	Co-production with Pipeline Entertainment
February 1, 2017	Police State	Action/Sci-fi	Kevin Arbouet	TBA

=== Upcoming productions ===
US Release	Title	Genre	Director	Notes
TBA	As Deep as the Grave	Action-adventure	Coerte Voorhees	Currently in post-production.
TBA	Head Smash	Sci-fi	TBA	Currently in development.
TBA	The French Executioner	Fantasy	TBA	Currently in development.
TBA	Untitled Jeremy Scott Documentary	Documentary	Vlad Yudin	Currently in production.
TBA	Untitled Edgar Project	Documentary	Vlad Yudin	Currently in production.
TBA	Untitled MMA Project	Documentary	Vlad Yudin	Currently in production.

== Distribution company ==
Vladar Vision is a division of The Vladar Company, focusing on acquiring and releasing multi-platform content to mainstream multi-cultural audiences through various mediums including Home Video, Digital, VOD, Cable Television and selective Theatrical.

Recent partnership with media giant American Media Inc, has broadened global appeal for Vladar's content. Vladar Vision has licensed a pipeline of feature films for worldwide distribution and has partnerships in place with major streaming video on demand service company's.

=== Vladar Vision ===
US Release	Title	Genre	Director	Notes
Fall, 2014	Death Metal Angola	Documentary	Jeremy Xido	TBA
Winter, 2014	Medeas	Drama	Andrea Pallaoro	TBA
2015	Police State (2015)	Action/Sci-fi	Kevin Arbouet	TBA
TBA	Crackheads	Comedy	Tim Tsiklauri	TBA
TBA	The Cost of Creativity	Documentary	Jon Biddle	TBA
TBA	Love Lies and Seeta	Romance	Chandra Pemmaraju	TBA
TBA	Domestic	Drama	Adrian Sitaru	TBA

== Generation Iron Fitness Network ==
Generation Iron Fitness Network was launched after the success of the film. It provides editorial content and entertainment for all things bodybuilding and fitness. Launched in July, 2014, the fitness network offers a variety of article topics such as workout routines, motivational pieces, nutrition diets, videos and exclusive news.

=== Mr. Olympia 2014 ===
The Vladar Company produced the Mr. Olympia competition for its 50th anniversary. The program was broadcast in two 90 minute specials in October 2014 by NBC Sports Group. Vlad Yudin directed the production. The program marks the first time Mr. Olympia has been televised since 1984.

== Publishing ==
The Vladar company is an active publisher of comics and graphic novels. Vladar has made appearances at many national and local comic con conventions throughout 2013 and 2014.

=== Head Smash ===
Head Smash is a graphic novel by writer Vlad Yudin, artist Tim Bradstreet, and colorist Dwayne Harris. It was published on July 31, 2013, through The Vladar Company. The story follows a superhero character in a pre-apocalyptic city. The producers of The Twilight Saga are set to co-produce the film adaptation.
