= Death metal (disambiguation) =

Death metal is an extreme subgenre of heavy metal.

Death metal may also refer to:

- Death Metal (Dismember album), 1998
- Death Metal (split album), a 1984 split album by the bands Helloween, Hellhammer, Running Wild and Dark Avenger
- Death Metal (comics), a character from the Marvel UK imprint of Marvel Comics
- "Death Metal", a song by Onslaught from the album Power from Hell, 1985
- "Death Metal", a song by Possessed from the album Seven Churches, 1985
- Dark Nights: Death Metal, 2020 crossover event of DC Comics
- Death Metal Angola, 2012 Portuguese film
- D>E>A>T>H>M>E>T>A>L, a 2000 EP and song by the English shoegaze band Panchiko
