= Police State (2017 film) =

- Film poster
- Directed by: Kevin Arbouet
- Written by: Kevin Arbouet
- Produced by: Vlad Yudin; Edwin Mejia
- Starring: Sean Young; Seth Gilliam; Kristina Klebe; Chris Riggi
- Cinematography: Jon Delgado
- Edited by: Justin Timms
- Music by: Miles Ito
- Distributed by: The Vladar Company
- Release date: February 1, 2017
- Country: United States
- Language: English

Police State is a 2017 American sci-fi and adventure film written and directed by Kevin Arbouet. The film stars Sean Young, Seth Gilliam, Kristina Klebe, and Chris Riggi.

== Cast ==
- Sean Young
- Neal Bledsoe as John
- Seth Gilliam as Officer Grady
- Chris Riggi as Carter Brooks
- Kristina Klebe as Katie
- Kelly AuCoin as Mayor

== Production ==
Filming took place primarily in Nassau County, New York.
