= Generation Iron =

- Theatrical release poster
- Directed by: Vlad Yudin
- Produced by: Vlad Yudin; Edwin Mejia Jr.
- Starring: Phil Heath; Kai Greene; Arnold Schwarzenegger; Ben Pakulski; Branch Warren; Dennis Wolf
- Narrated by: Mickey Rourke
- Cinematography: Colin Morvan; Guy Livneh
- Edited by: Justin Timms
- Music by: Jeff Rona
- Distributed by: The Vladar Company
- Release dates: September 20, 2013 (United States); November 10, 2013 (Denmark)
- Running time: 106 minutes
- Country: United States
- Language: English
- Box office: $849,523

Generation Iron is a 2013 American documentary film which follows the world's leading professional bodybuilders as they train and compete for the 2012 Mr. Olympia. Considered to be a spiritual sequel to the 1977 documentary Pumping Iron, the film gives access to the lives of the top seven bodybuilders in the sport, including Phil Heath, Kai Greene, Branch Warren, and Dennis Wolf. The film is narrated by Mickey Rourke, and features appearances by Arnold Schwarzenegger, Lou Ferrigno, and Jay Cutler.

The film is directed by Vlad Yudin and produced by Edwin Mejia Jr. at The Vladar Company and Generation Iron Brands.

== Cast ==
- Phil Heath
- Kai Greene
- Arnold Schwarzenegger
- Ben Pakulski
- Branch Warren
- Dennis Wolf
- Roelly Winklaar
- Hidetada Yamagishi
- Victor Martínez
- Mike Katz
- Lou Ferrigno
- Mickey Rourke (voice)
- Jacob Wilson

== Synopsis ==
Generation Iron chronicles seven top bodybuilders as they train to compete in the 2012 Mr. Olympia.

== Release ==
=== United States ===
Generation Iron was released in 53 cinemas across the U.S. on September 20, 2013. The film expanded to reach over 100 cinemas in various areas of the country. The release of the film coincided with the 2013 Mr. Olympia, held at the Orleans Hotel in Las Vegas on September 28, 2013.

=== Canada ===
On October 7, 2013, Generation Iron opened for a one-night-only event in 21 locations across Canada.

=== International ===
The film had its European premiere at the Copenhagen International Documentary Festival on November 10, 2013. The sold-out screening was held at the 650 seat Bremen Teater. The next day, it was announced that Generation Iron had secured distribution deals for Australia, Brazil, Germany, and New Zealand, with deals soon to be finalized with China, Finland, Italy, Norway, Spain, Sweden, and the UK.

== Reception ==
=== Box office ===
Generation Iron opened on September 20, 2013, with an opening weekend box office total of $245,000, making it the biggest documentary opening of 2013. It held its position as the No. 1 documentary in the U.S. at the box office for three consecutive weeks after its release. Its domestic total as of January 3, 2014 was $849,521.

=== Critical reception ===
Generation Iron opened to positive reviews. On Rotten Tomatoes it has an 80% approval rating based on reviews from 15 critics.

Ernest Hardy of The Village Voice gave the film a perfect score and called it "a gorgeous meditation on age-old existential concerns". The Los Angeles Times called Generation Iron "an intimate portrait of bodybuilders" and praised the film as being "compelling and energetic". Louis Black of The Austin Chronicle stated that the film is "really a triumph of intelligent, strategic filmmaking". Philip Martin, president of the Southeastern Film Critics Association, stated in the Arkansas Democrat-Gazette that Generation Iron is not just a film for bodybuilding fans and that "like all good stories, this movie about bodybuilding is really about much more".

Generation Iron also received some mixed reviews. Nicole Herrington of The New York Times gave the film 2.5 stars and wrote, "For a documentary about extreme discipline, the filmmakers lack restraint: the movie, about 20 minutes too long, undercuts much of its own momentum." Nick Schager of The Dissolve expressed disdain for how the film "goes into absolutely no detail regarding the specifics of how [the bodybuilders] design their diets or their workout regimens". Film critic Tim Falkenberg of MXDWN praised the film for the same reasons, stating that "much in the way Ron Howard's Rush, released earlier this year, was about the competitors, not understanding Formula 1 competition, the documentary Generation Iron largely eschews educating its audience on the intricacies of its subject matter in favor of focusing on the competitors themselves".

=== Accolades ===
Awards
Award	Category	Recipients and nominees	Result
Buffalo Niagara Film Festival	Audience Award	Vlad Yudin, Edwin Mejia Jr.	Won
Nevada International Film Festival	Platinum Reel Award	Vlad Yudin, Edwin Mejia Jr.	Won
Rincon International Film Festival	Best Documentary Film	Vlad Yudin, Edwin Mejia Jr.	Won
Accolade Competition	Award of Excellence (Best Feature Documentary)	Vlad Yudin, Edwin Mejia Jr.	Won
Accolade Competition	Award of Merit (Best Voice-Over Talent)	Mickey Rourke	Won
Flex Magazine	Steve Stone Vanguard Award	Vlad Yudin	Won
Synchrotones Awards	Best Individual Cue	Jeff Rona, "Stress Relief"	Won
Copenhagen International Documentary Festival	Audience Award	Vlad Yudin, Edwin Mejia Jr.	Nominated

=== Top ten lists ===
- The Huffington Post film critic Jon Eig listed Kai Greene's performance in Generation Iron as his #1 moment in film in 2013.
- Inside Pulse listed Generation Iron #2 on their list of the top 10 films of 2013.
- Tribeca Film Institute listed Generation Iron as #6 on their top 10 documentary 'Power Rankings'.
- Indiewire reported Generation Iron finished 2013 as the No. 7 highest grossing documentary, finishing with $849,521.

== Home media ==
The Vladar Company released an extended director's cut on Blu-ray and DVD exclusively for sale on their website on April 4, 2014. Starz Inc. released the theatrical version of Generation Iron digitally on iTunes on April 4, 2014 and VOD/Amazon on April 15, 2014. Anchor Bay Entertainment released the theatrical version of Generation Iron on DVD on May 13, 2014.

== Music ==
Jeff Rona composed the original score for Generation Iron. A soundtrack album was released on Milan Records.

Additional songs featured in the film include:

- "Never Gonna Stop" by Mind the Gap featuring Quan, also used in the film's official trailer
- "Some Say" by SolarDrive & TC
- "In Da Gym" by Melle Mel
- "Size" by Melle Mel
- "Double Life" by Sixth Gate
- "Unattached Human" by Sixth Gate

== See also ==
- Generation Iron 2, a 2017 sequel film
