= Pouliquen =

Pouliquen is a Breton surname. Notable people with the surname include:

- Yves Pouliquen (1931–2020), French ophthalmologist
- Yvon Pouliquen (born 1962), French footballer and manager

== See also ==
- Poliquin
