= Head Smash =

2013 graphic novel by Vlad Yudin

- Author: Vlad Yudin (writer), Tim Bradstreet (artist), Dwayne Harris (colorist)
- Language: English
- Genre: Graphic novel
- Publisher: Arcana Studio, The Vladar Company
- Publication date: July 31, 2013
- Publication place: United States
- Media type: Print
- Pages: 146 pages
- ISBN: 1771351624

Head Smash a graphic novel by writer Vlad Yudin, artist Tim Bradstreet, and colorist Dwayne Harris. It was released on July 31, 2013 through Arcana Studio. The story follows a superhero character in a pre-apocalyptic city. A film adaptation of Head Smash is in development.

== Synopsis ==
"Head Smash" is set in an alternate reality in the pre-apocalyptic city of Ares where the government has all but disappeared and ruthless criminal organizations vie for control of the streets. Of the gangs battling for control of the city, The Horde is the most brutal and merciless. Their red-skull wearing members patrol the streets, meting out punishment to any that oppose their authority. The leader, Maurice, with his coiffed hair and pressed suits is willing to go to any means necessary to solidify The Horde's hold on the city. He adopts a young violent orphan by the name of Smash and raises him up to be the perfect most callous soldier. Smash knows only the Horde, they are his family, and he is dutifully loyal. That is until one day, while on a mission for his masters, he's ambushed by his own brethren and left for dead. Were it not for the unexpected help of a mysterious hermit that rescues Smash from his death bed, he would never have survived. Now with the few friends he has left and the gift of a powerful serum that gives him super human strength, Smash sets out to repay his former comrades for their treachery.
