= Chris Riggi =

American actor (born 1985)

- Born: Christopher Riggi; September 18, 1985 (age 40); New York City, New York, U.S.
- Education: Walnut Hill School
- Occupation: Actor
- Years active: 2008–present
- Spouse: Stephanie Koenig (m. 2022)
- Children: 1

Christopher Riggi (born September 18, 1985) is an American actor, known for his role as Scott Rosson in the teen drama television series Gossip Girl, and Jacob White in the Twilight parody film Vampires Suck which was released in the US on August 18, 2010. Riggi was writer, director, editor, cinematographer, and actor in the film, "Abduct," released April 2, 2025.

Riggi was born in New York City, New York and is the son of philanthropists Michele and Ron Riggi. He started his career in 2008 in the short film Brotherhood as Jared, before moving onto screen works such as the independent films Toe to Toe and Dare. Additionally, Riggi made guest appearances in several TV series such as Human Giant and Lipstick Jungle.

Riggi played a role in The Wolf of Wall Street.

== Filmography ==
Film
| Year | Title | Role | Notes |
|---|---|---|---|
| 2008 | Brotherhood | Jared | Short film |
| 2009 | Toe to Toe | Jason | |
| 2009 | Dare | Josh | |
| 2009 | The Ministers | Boy | Uncredited |
| 2010 | Vampires Suck | Jacob White | Lead role |
| 2012 | Hated | Freddie | |
| 2012 | To Redemption | Joey Reed | |
| 2012 | Bazaaro | Benjamin Bazaaro | Short film; also director and producer |
| 2013 | Adult World | Josh | |
| 2013 | Chrysalis | Jake | Also producer and executive producer |
| 2013 | 36 Saints | Dominic | |
| 2013 | Contest | Ned | |
| 2013 | The Wolf of Wall Street | Party broker #1 | |
| 2014 | Red Butterfly | Henri Stone | |
| 2014 | Fairfield | Fenton | |
| 2014 | Living with the Dead | Roland | |
| 2014 | Lily & Kat | Colin | |
| 2014 | Police State | Carter Brooks | |
| 2015 | Get Happy | Charlie | |
| 2015 | Welcome to the Wage Theft Zone | Payment Man | Short film |
| 2016 | The Good Girl | Skip | Short film |
| 2017 | Bad for Clowns | Clown | Short film |
| 2018 | Curtis: Single Gay Friend | Chris | Short film |
| 2018 | Grandmother's Gold | Chris | |
| 2019 | Web Series: The Movie | Matthew Giacommi | Online release |
| 2020 | Overlook | Reed | |
| 2020 | Good Luck with Everything | Kace | |
| 2022 | A Spy Movie | Mumbling Man | |
| 2022 | Ambrosio | Luca | |
| 2025 | Abduct | "Chris" | Writer, Director, Editor, Director of Photography, Actor |

Television
| Year | Title | Role | Notes |
|---|---|---|---|
| 2008 | Human Giant | Brandon Stillman | Episode "I Want More Corn Chowder" |
| 2008 | The Guiding Light | Sleazy | Season 1, episode 15.530 |
| 2008 | Lipstick Jungle | Paul | Episode: "Chapter Seventeen: Bye, Bye Baby" |
| 2009 | Gossip Girl | Scott Rosson | 6 episodes |
| 2009 | Important Things with Demetri Martin | Praxitilles | Episode: "Coolness" |
| 2012 | Americana | Vince Banning | Unsold ABC pilot |
| 2014 | The Emperors | Vic | Television film |
| 2015 | CSI: Cyber | Juice Jacker #2 | Episode: " LOM1S" |
| 2015 | Eye Candy | Lou | Pilot episode |
| 2021 | Impeachment: American Crime Story | Jake Tapper | Episode: "Do You Hear What I Hear?" |
| 2023 | Minx | Dustin | Episode: "A Stately Pleasure Dome Decree" |
| 2023 | Just for Showmance | Joe Wright | Television film |
| 2024-2025 | English Teacher | Nick | 6 episodes |

Web series
| Year | Title | Role | Notes |
|---|---|---|---|
| 2016 | Go-Go Boy Interrupted | Griff | 3 episodes |
| 2019 | Johnno and Michael Try | Johnno's Evil Twin/Guy Fieri | 2 episodes, Funny Or Die release |
