= Generation Iron 2 =

- Directed by: Vlad Yudin
- Produced by: Vlad Yudin; Edwin Mejia
- Starring: Kai Greene; Calum von Moger; Rich Piana; Iris Kyle
- Edited by: Matthew Adams
- Release date: May 12, 2017
- Running time: 106 minutes
- Country: United States
- Language: English

Generation Iron 2 is a 2017 documentary film and sequel to Generation Iron. The film follows the next generation of bodybuilders as the industry opens up to viral internet stars as well as younger bodybuilders pushing the limits of how massive the human physique can become. The film features Kai Greene, Calum Von Moger, Rich Piana, and Flex Wheeler, among other athletes.

Generation Iron 2 was released in limited theatrical, DVD, and Video On Demand on May 12, 2017.

== Cast ==
- Kai Greene
- Calum von Moger
- Rich Piana
- Iris Kyle
- Flex Wheeler
- Mamdouh Elssbiay
- Hidetada Yamagishi
- Brandon Curry
- Dana Linn Bailey

== Synopsis ==
Generation Iron 2 is the sequel to the 2013 documentary film Generation Iron. The follow-up film, directed by Vlad Yudin, follows the top five bodybuilding and fitness mega-stars on the journey to build the ultimate physique. Exploring the world of social media and internet, the film depicts how the rules have changed as to what makes a successful "mass monster" bodybuilder. A new generation, new bodybuilders, new world, and new people carve their own path to physique perfection.
