= Last Day of Summer (film) =

- Theatrical release poster
- Directed by: Vlad Yudin
- Written by: Vlad Yudin
- Produced by: Larry Strong; Kevin Arbouet; Vlad Yudin; Edwin Mejia
- Starring: DJ Qualls; Nikki Reed; William Sadler
- Cinematography: Partyk Rebisz
- Edited by: Susan Graef
- Distributed by: E1 Entertainment Distribution
- Release date: October 24, 2009
- Running time: 105 minutes
- Country: United States
- Language: English

Last Day of Summer is a 2009 drama-dark comedy film written, produced and directed by Vlad Yudin of The Vladar Company, featuring DJ Qualls, Nikki Reed, and William Sadler.

== Plot ==
Gregory (a.k.a. "Joe") (DJ Qualls) is a disturbed fast-food worker, who has reached the end of his mental tether after being tormented and humiliated by his cruel boss, Mr. Crolick (William Sadler). Fed up with Joe’s ineptitude, Crolick fires Joe. Joe soon hatches a deadly plot for revenge and returns to the restaurant only to become side-tracked when he catches the eye of Stefanie (Nikki Reed), a beautiful female patron. However, Joe completely misinterprets his encounter with Stefanie and ends up unintentionally kidnapping her.

== Cast ==
- DJ Qualls as Joe/Gregory
- Nikki Reed as Stefanie
- William Sadler as Mr. Crolick
- Joe Van Mater as Fast Food Employee #1
- Richard J. Brightman as Car Driver #1
- Alek Dykeman as Guy With Sandwich #1

== Reception ==
Critical reception for Last Day of Summer was generally negative, with the film holding a 17% approval rating on Rotten Tomatoes based on six reviews. The New York Times reviewer considered that it "had a chance to be a decent movie, but Vlad Yudin, who directed and wrote it, couldn't resist a potty joke. A long, grating potty joke." A reviewer for The Village Voice felt that the film "promises what it has no intention of delivering".
