= Death Metal Angola =

2012 Portuguese biographical film

- Directed by: Jeremy Xido
- Produced by: Joseph Castelo; Jeremy Xido; Travis Burgess; David Gallagher (executive); Vlad Yudin (executive); Edwin Mejia (executive)
- Starring: Wilker Flores; Sonia Ferreira
- Cinematography: Johan Legraie
- Edited by: Todd Holmes
- Music by: Christian Frederickson
- Distributed by: The Vladar Company
- Release date: December 13, 2012 (Dubai International Film Festival)
- Running time: 83 minutes
- Language: Portuguese
- Box office: $2,500

Death Metal Angola is a 2012 Portuguese music biographical film directed by Jeremy Xido.

== Cast ==
- Wilker Flores
- Sonia Ferreira

== Release ==
Death Metal Angola was released theatrically in the US on November 7, 2014.

== Reception ==
Death Metal Angola received unanimous acclaim during its festival run. The Huffington Post's E. Nina Rothe called Death Metal Angola a "must-watch film" and "a cult-classic in the making." indieWIRE film critic Matt Mueller called it an “absorbing, beautifully shot documentary" and a "superb film.” The Hollywood Reporter's Neil Young wrote, "Jeremy Xido's US-Angolan documentary traces how an extreme form of rock music has taken root in war-torn corner of south-west Africa" and stated that the film is "raucously crowd-pleasing."
