= The Hurt Business (film) =

Mixed martial arts documentary

- Film poster
- Directed by: Vlad Yudin
- Produced by: Edwin Mejia; Vlad Yudin
- Starring: Rashad Evans; Jon Jones; Sara McMann; Michael "Joker" Guymon
- Narrated by: Kevin Costner
- Cinematography: Kevin Israel Castro; Kristin Mendez; Eliana Álvarez Martínez
- Edited by: Matthew Adams
- Music by: Nate Kohrs
- Production companies: The Vladar Company; Generation Iron Fitness Network
- Distributed by: The Vladar Company
- Release date: 29 September 2016
- Running time: 107 minutes
- Country: United States
- Language: English

The Hurt Business (stylized as THE HURT BUSINE$$) is a 2016 American documentary film about mixed martial arts, its history, and rise from a stigmatized, fringe event to a mainstream sport. It is directed by Vlad Yudin and narrated by Kevin Costner.

== Participants ==
- Luke Adams
- Ben Askren
- Josh Barnett
- Charles Bernick
- Bruce Buffer
- Donald Cerrone
- Michael Chandler
- Scott Coker
- Bill Cole
- Daniel Cormier
- Randy Couture
- Rachael Cummins
- Clint Santiago Dahl
- Robert Emerson
- Rashad Evans
- Urijah Faber
- Patricia Fahy
- Kenny Florian
- Don Frye
- Howard Gelb
- Gary Goodridge
- Rorion Gracie
- Mike Guymon
- Nicole Guymon
- Rosa Delia Guymon
- Ariel Helwani
- Jay Hieron
- Michael Hutchison
- Scott Ispirescu
- Jon Jones
- Shannon Knapp
- Kimo Leopoldo
- Chuck Liddell
- Jason Manly
- Alan Marcus
- Israel Martinez
- Ian McCall
- 'Big' John McCarthy
- Justin McCully
- Sara McMann
- King Mo
- Phil Nurse
- Robert Oristaglio
- Tito Ortiz
- Rory Ransom
- Glenn Robinson
- Luke Rockhold
- Ronda Rousey
- Bas Rutten
- Matt Serra
- Ken Shamrock
- Danny Shulmann
- Tyrone Spong
- Georges St-Pierre
- Phil Steck
- Fabricio Werdum
- Vernon Williams
- Michelle Waterson
- Angela Lee
- Toka Doundobeli

== Reception ==
A review by The Hollywood Reporter described it as "a scattered intro that offers some history and introduces a few of the players who are currently big on the scene, but hardly inspires a disinterested viewer to drop everything and set the DVR for the next UFC bout. Some faithful fight fans may rally for the doc's theatrical bookings, but even on VOD, it promises to underwhelm most for whom the names Jon Jones and Sara McMann mean something."
