= Rich Piana =

American bodybuilder and internet personality (1970–2017)

- Professional bodybuilder

Personal info
- Born: September 26, 1970; Glendale, California, U.S.
- Died: August 25, 2017 (aged 46); Clearwater, Florida, U.S.

Best statistics
- Height: 6 ft 1 in (185 cm)
- Weight: 221–330 lb (100–150 kg)

Professional (Pro) career
- Pro-debut: National Physique Committee (NPC) Mr. California, 1998

Richard Eugene Piana (September 26, 1970 – August 25, 2017) was an American bodybuilder, businessman, and YouTuber. He won the National Physique Committee (NPC) Mr. Teen California title in 1989, NPC Mr. California in 1998, and NPC competitions in 2003 and 2009.

Piana was popular in the weightlifting community for his bodybuilding achievements, openness about steroid use in bodybuilding and its associated consequences, and over-the-top extroverted personality. He maintained a successful YouTube channel which featured motivational speaking, personal life stories, exercise montages, special guest appearances, and insights into his daily life. In his videos, he often spoke of the mentality and drive of "the 5%", which he said is the percentage of people who are willing to do whatever it takes to achieve their goals. Piana openly discussed using anabolic steroids and hormones, including trenbolone.

In August 2017, at the age of 46, Piana collapsed and spent two weeks in a coma before dying. According to his autopsy report, both his heart and liver weighed twice the average amount for an adult male; it was also noted that he had "mild atherosclerotic disease". However, the autopsy report was ultimately inconclusive on the cause and manner of his death due to the hospital's disposal of all toxicology specimens.

== Early life ==
Richard Eugene Piana was born in Glendale, California, on September 26, 1970. He was of Italian descent through his father and Armenian descent through his mother. He was raised by his mother in Sacramento, California. His love of bodybuilding began when he was six years old, as he would often go to the gym to watch his mother train for her bodybuilding contests. He was influenced by both her and bodybuilder Bill Cambra. At age 11, he began lifting weights. Four years later, he started competing in bodybuilding contests. During his senior year at Encina High School, he lived with his father in La Crescenta, California.

== Career ==
Piana started his professional career by winning the NPC Mr. Teen California competition in 1989. At the age of 18, Piana started a common steroid cycle practice known as "test and deca" that combines testosterone and Deca-Durabolin. In 2014, he stated that due to the dramatic results he achieved with steroids, he got "hooked" on them. In 1998, he was named NPC Mr. California. He continued to compete on and off until 2011, winning NPC competitions in the 2003 Los Angeles Super-Heavyweight division, 2009 Sacramento Super-Heavyweight division, and the 2009 Border States Classic Super-Heavyweight division and overall championship. He was featured on the cover of the November 1998 issue of Ironman magazine and the Summer 2015 issue of Muscle Sport magazine.

Piana had a cameo appearance as Hulk in an episode of the television series Scrubs, and played an oiled-up muscle man named Marcus in a 2004 episode of Malcolm in the Middle (without any spoken lines). He also appeared in the 1999 episode of The Parkers titled "The Boomerang Effect". He was one of the main focuses of the 2017 bodybuilding documentary Generation Iron 2.

In 2014, Piana asserted that he had experienced some side effects from his use of steroids, including hair loss, gynecomastia (enlarged breasts, which he had treated with medication), and signs of liver toxicity. In a 2016 video, Piana backed up his decision to use steroids but advised viewers not to use them, stating, "If you have the choice to do steroids or stay natural, stay natural. There's no reason to do steroids. You're only hurting your body and hurting yourself." He then said that professional bodybuilders have no such choice, since they cannot win at that level without using the drugs. He said, "I was competing on stage and I was getting to the point where I was going to keep getting blown off the stage if I didn't do them. So I took that step and that's the road I chose, and here I am."

Piana offered advice on how to use steroids for those he said were going to use them anyway. He said that when he was competing at the national level, he was taking 20 international units per day of Serostim, a synthetic form of human growth hormone, which would cost about $8,000 per month at ordinary prescription prices (although he was sometimes getting it for free or for about $2,000 through connections with people who had prescriptions for it to fight HIV infection).

Piana quit bodybuilding competitions in his final years to spend his time as a YouTuber and businessman, with his nutrition product line called Rich Piana: 5% Nutrition. The meaning of "5%" in the name of the brand is that "5% represents the percentage of people that are out there actually doing whatever it takes to fulfill their dreams, to accomplish their goals, and to live the type of life they want to live". In his post-competition life, he promoted his brand and frequently spoke about the use of steroids and hormones and the associated consequences. He made appearances at fitness expos; in videos posted on YouTube, he gave advice about diet and fitness routines. He had 1.2 million followers on Instagram and hundreds of thousands of subscribers on YouTube.

== Personal life ==
Piana was married twice. His first marriage ended in divorce after he had an affair. He then had a longstanding on-again, off-again relationship with American fitness model Chanel Jansen. He married Icelandic bodybuilder Sara Heimisdóttir in 2015. They separated in 2016, and he later accused her of using him to qualify for a U.S. green card and stealing money from him. Their marriage was annulled for having taken place under false pretenses, and he resumed his relationship with Jansen, who was his partner at the time of his death. According to Jansen, Piana had struggled with opiate addiction at some point.

== Death ==
At 1:30 p.m. on August 7, 2017, Piana collapsed while having his hair cut by Jansen at his home in Clearwater, Florida. He was standing at the time and hit his head when he collapsed. Jansen called the emergency number 9-1-1 and followed the operator's instructions to attempt CPR, until paramedics arrived about 10 minutes into her call. The paramedics confirmed that Piana's heart was not beating properly. His heartbeat was eventually restored, but so much time had passed that brain damage had set in from lack of oxygen. After the discovery of crushed white powder along with a straw and a credit card on the table in his home, paramedics administered naloxone, a medication used to counteract a possible opiate overdose. There was later speculation about possible recreational drug use, foul play, or other unknown factors involved in his death. However, Jansen denied that cocaine, heroin, or other drugs were involved, saying that Piana had sometimes snorted a high-caffeine pre-workout supplement and that he did not use recreational drugs. Twenty bottles of testosterone were reportedly found in his home. Jansen later said that Piana's brain had been deprived of oxygen for over 30 minutes, and that in the last few days before his collapse he had exhibited some unusual symptoms including shortness of breath and nausea. She said she was later told these may have been warning signs of an impending cardiac arrest.

After spending two weeks in an induced coma to try to reduce swelling to the brain, Piana died on August 25 at the age of 46. An autopsy revealed "significant heart disease" and that his heart and liver weighed over twice the average amount for an adult male. Jansen said Piana was well aware that his organs were enlarged, and that this was a known side effect of the steroids and hormones he had been taking, but said he was not aware that this put him at risk for a sudden cardiac arrest. The autopsy was ultimately inconclusive on the cause and manner of death. No toxicology analysis was performed for the autopsy, and no access to any toxicology analysis from the period of his hospital treatment was made available to the medical examiner for study; the hospital had discarded the specimens needed for a later toxicology analysis, despite specific requests to preserve them for analysis. This led to conspiracy theories about a possible cover-up of the true circumstances and cause of his death. The autopsy report said there was no evidence of recent injury, appearing to rule out physical trauma as a significant factor in his death.
