= Jeremy Scott: The People's Designer =

2015 film by Vlad Yudin

- Theatrical release poster
- Directed by: Vlad Yudin
- Written by: Vlad Yudin
- Produced by: Edwin Mejia; Vlad Yudin; Matt Kapp; Patrick Solomon
- Cinematography: Colin Morvan
- Edited by: Matthew Adams
- Music by: Sebastián Kauderer
- Distributed by: The Vladar Company
- Release date: September 18, 2015
- Running time: 110 minutes
- Country: United States
- Language: English

Jeremy Scott: The People's Designer is a 2015 documentary film directed by Vlad Yudin detailing the life of American fashion designer Jeremy Scott and his rise in the fashion industry.

The film was released on September 18, 2015. It features appearances by CL from 2NE1, Jared Leto, Miley Cyrus, Rihanna, Lady Gaga, Devon Aoki, Katy Perry, Rita Ora, Paris Hilton, ASAP Rocky, and Nicky Hilton.

Jeremy Scott: The People's Designer was not widely reviewed prior to its initial limited run in theaters. Adam Tschorn of Los Angeles Times was mixed in his review. He highlighted it for "offer[ing] a odd thumbnail sketch of the reigning crown prince of fashion," but predicted Scott's fan to be "frustrated by the film because the brush strokes are broad, and the focus feels more about the scrum and swirl around the man than the man himself".
