= Bigger (film) =

2018 film directed by George Gallo

- Directed by: George Gallo
- Written by: George Gallo; Brad Furman; Ellen Furman; Andy Weiss
- Produced by: Steve Lee Jones; Scott LaStaiti; Camilo Castro; Eric Weider
- Starring: Tyler Hoechlin; Aneurin Barnard; Julianne Hough; Victoria Justice; Calum Von Moger; Tom Arnold; DJ Qualls
- Cinematography: Michael Negrin
- Music by: Jeff Beal
- Production company: Bee Holder Productions
- Distributed by: Freestyle Releasing
- Release dates: September 13, 2018 (Las Vegas premiere); October 12, 2018
- Running time: 107 minutes
- Country: United States
- Language: English

Bigger (styled as Bigger: The Joe Weider Story) is a 2018 American comedy drama film by director George Gallo about the life of real life bodybuilders Joe and Ben Weider.

== Plot ==
Brothers Joe and Ben Weider were the architects of Muscle. Against all odds, they launched an empire. Along the way they discovered Arnold Schwarzenegger, inspired female empowerment, championed diversity, and started a movement that changed the world of bodybuilding in the United States.

Before Ben's Jewish funeral in 2008, Joe tells the story to a writer, and the events of his life are shown in flashbacks. Joe's mother didn't want him, and after he sneaked into the circus with Ben in 1932 Montreal, she beat him. Bullies steal the money Joe earned by his hard work as a boy, so Joe begins working out, inspired by the magazines of Bill Hauk. Joe also draws men with muscles, and he becomes a competitive weightlifter. Though his father is supportive, his mother thinks he is wasting his life, and he leaves home with Ben.

Joe studies bodies and fitness and intends to teach people to be their best selves, and not just in competition, with his own magazine. He meets his first wife at the university library, but they break up over his obsessive behavior and her unwillingness to let him improve himself. Joe also quits a job working for an anti-Semitic restaurant owner.

During World War II, Ben enlists, but Joe is told his work to make people fit can do more good than actually serving, since the military needs men who are fit. Roy Hawkins invites Joe to New York City and says he wants Joe's magazine to be part of his company. In New Jersey, Joe builds a successful business.

Joe enters several men in the Mr. Universe contest but is told they can't compete because they are professionals. Joe threatens to have his own competition, and his men are allowed to continue. Soon, Ben is running the International Federation of Body Building and has the goal of making bodybuilding an Olympic event.

Joe and Ben move to California where there is more interest in fitness. At Jack LaLanne's gym, Joe meets the pretty Betty and they begin a relationship, eventually getting married.

Bill ridicules Joe throughout the movie, but his associate Jerry finally has had enough, and he goes to work for Joe and Ben, who start their own fitness competition called Mr. Olympia. This happens despite Hawkins' business going under, forcing the brothers to go out on their own. And Ben has to take another job at first.

As Joe looks at photos of interested men, he sees the ideal man, the man he drew as a child. His name is Arnold, and he is from Austria. No one wants to try to pronounce his last name. Joe goes to Austria and asks Arnold to come to California. People like him, and he enters the Mr. Olympia contest and wins.

Arnold Schwarzenegger becomes a major movie star, and Joe's company succeeds.

Ben is praised at the funeral.

== Cast ==
- Tyler Hoechlin as Joe Weider
- Aneurin Barnard as Ben Weider
- Julianne Hough as Betty Weider
- Victoria Justice as Huguette "Kathy" Weider (Based on Hedwiges "Vicky" Uzar)
- Steve Guttenberg as Louis Weider
- DJ Qualls as Michael Steere
- Tom Arnold as Roy Hawkins
- Calum Von Moger as Arnold Schwarzenegger
- Colton Haynes as Jack LaLanne
- Max Martini as Jerry George
- Kevin Durand as Bill Hauk
- Robert Forster as Joe Weider in 2008
- Stan De Longeaux as Claude Regine
- James Adam Madsen Jr. as Bill Pearl
- Sergio Oliva Jr. as Sergio Oliva Sr.

== Reception ==
On review aggregator Rotten Tomatoes, the film holds an approval rating of 20% based on 10 reviews, and an average rating of 4.3/10. On Metacritic, the film has a weighted average score of 37 out of 100 based on 5 critics, indicating "generally unfavorable" reviews. Michael Rechtshaffen of Los Angeles Times wrote: "Without a sturdier script featuring fully dimensional characters... the performances prove to be as unconvincing as their ethnic accents and period wigs."
