= Poliquin =

Poliquin is a surname. Notable people with the surname include:

- Bruce Poliquin (born 1953), American businessman and politician
- Charles Poliquin (1961–2018), Canadian strength coach and fitness author
- Daniel Poliquin (born 1953), Canadian novelist and translator
- John Poliquin (born 1986), Canadian film director
- Laurent Poliquin (born 1975), Canadian poet
