= The Poliquin Principles =

1997 book by Charles Poliquin

Cover of the second edition of The Poliquin Principles, which was published almost a decade after the first

The Poliquin Principles: Successful Methods for Strength and Mass Development is a 1997 bodybuilding and strength training book by Charles Poliquin, former strength and conditioning coach of the Canadian Olympic team, and strength coach of several athletes competing in the NHL and other professional and amateur sporting organizations. The book contains a basic formatting of Poliquin's training methods and regimens. Intended for the purpose of helping athletes to improve at their sport and non-athletes to gain muscle mass, it has become a well-known work in its field.

The Poliquin Principles has been described as being accessible to the beginner, and also of use to the more advanced trainer. The book is extremely well researched and contains references to studies done on several continents. Other reviews were positive overall, but criticized the layout and poor photos which did not serve much illustrative purpose.
