= Charles Poliquin =

Canadian strength coach and author

- Born: March 5, 1961; Ottawa, Ontario, Canada
- Died: September 26, 2018 (aged 57)
- Occupations: Strength coach, fitness author

Charles R. Poliquin (March 5, 1961 – September 26, 2018) was a Canadian strength coach, author and low-carbohydrate diet advocate. He was known within the bodybuilding community for his articles on strength training and for his unconventional meat and nuts diet.

== Early life and education ==
Charles Poliquin was born on March 5, 1961, in Ottawa, Ontario, Canada and started strength training at an early age. He earned a master's degree in exercise physiology.

== Career ==
Poliquin began working as a strength coach while he was in graduate school in Canada. He helped popularize German Volume Training. In the late 1990s, Poliquin founded Poliquin Performance, opening the first Poliquin Performance Center in Phoenix, Arizona in 2001, and the Poliquin Strength Institute in East Greenwich, Rhode Island, in 2009. Throughout this time he certified coaches in the Poliquin International Certification Program (PICP), which includes a body hormone profiling method, which he invented, called BioSignature Modulation. In September 2013 Poliquin parted ways with Poliquin Performance (now renamed Poliquin Group). He subsequently founded another fitness company called Strength Sensei. He trained numerous Olympic and professional athletes.

Poliquin published articles in peer-reviewed journals of exercise science and strength and conditioning. His training theories were introduced to the bodybuilding community in 1993 through his articles for Muscle Media 2000 magazine, and after 1998 through the online and print versions of Testosterone Magazine (now known as T-Nation). He coined the phrase "the myth of discipline" to suggest that fitness results depend on how motivated a gym-goer is. As a columnist, he penned over 600 articles in numerous publications. Additionally, he is the author of eight books, many of which have been translated into 12 different languages, including Swedish, German, French, Italian, Dutch, and Japanese. His first book, The Poliquin Principles formatted a basic summary of his training methods and provided insight into the training regimens of some of the world's top athletes.

== Diet ==
Poliquin promoted a low-carbohydrate meat-based diet. His diet was known as the "meat and nuts" diet as it emphasized the consumption of red meat, chicken or fish at breakfast with almonds, hazelnuts and macadamia nuts. When questioned about the best dietary option for energy and optimal leanness, Poliquin commented that "it’s simple, try the Meat and Nuts Breakfast".

== Death ==
Poliquin died on September 26, 2018, at the age of 57. The cause of death was not officially stated. A tribute to Poliquin on a weightlifting website to which he was a contributor indicated he died of a heart attack. Friend and former client Gary Roberts stated, “He lost his father early to a genetic heart disease. He knew he had this in his family. He had a heart attack previously, so he was on top of his nutrition as a result. I knew that was a concern for him.”

Poliquin was survived by his daughter.

== Selected list of trainees ==
- Helen Maroulis, first American female wrestler to win an Olympic gold medal
- David Boston, NFL Pro Bowl wide receiver
- Al MacInnis, Retired NHL defenseman, Norris Trophy winner
- Joe Nieuwendyk, Florida Panthers, Conn Smythe Trophy winner, Stanley Cup winner
- Chris Pronger, Anaheim Ducks, Stanley Cup winner; winner of Norris and Hart Trophies
- Connor Dunlop, Bradshaw Cup Winner
- Canadian short-track speed-skating team
- Dwight Phillips, Olympic Gold Medalist long jumper
- Nanceen Perry, World Record Holder 4 x 200 metre
- Michelle Freeman, former number 1 ranked hurdler in the World.
- Larry Vinette, World Champion Bodybuilder & Trainer
- Chris Thorpe, Olympic Silver & Bronze Medalist, Double's Luge
- Adam Nelson, World Champion & Olympic Gold Medalist, Shot Put
- Ben Pakulski, Top Canadian Bodybuilder and Trainer
- Gary Roberts, NHL player—Roberts credits Poliquin with having helped him make a successful return to the NHL after 2 of his previous return attempts failed due to physical injury.

== Books ==
- The Poliquin Principles - 1997, 2006
- The German Body Comp Program - 1997, 2005
- Manly Weight Loss - 1998
- Modern Trends in Strength Training - 2000, 2001, 2005
- Winning the Arms Race - 2000, 2001, 2005
- Applied Strongman Training for Sport (with co-author Art McDermott) - 2006
- Ask Coach Poliquin (Volumes I and II) - 2006
- Arm Size and Strength: The Ultimate Guide - 2015
