= Calum Von Moger =

Australian actor and bodybuilder (born 1990)

- Professional bodybuilder
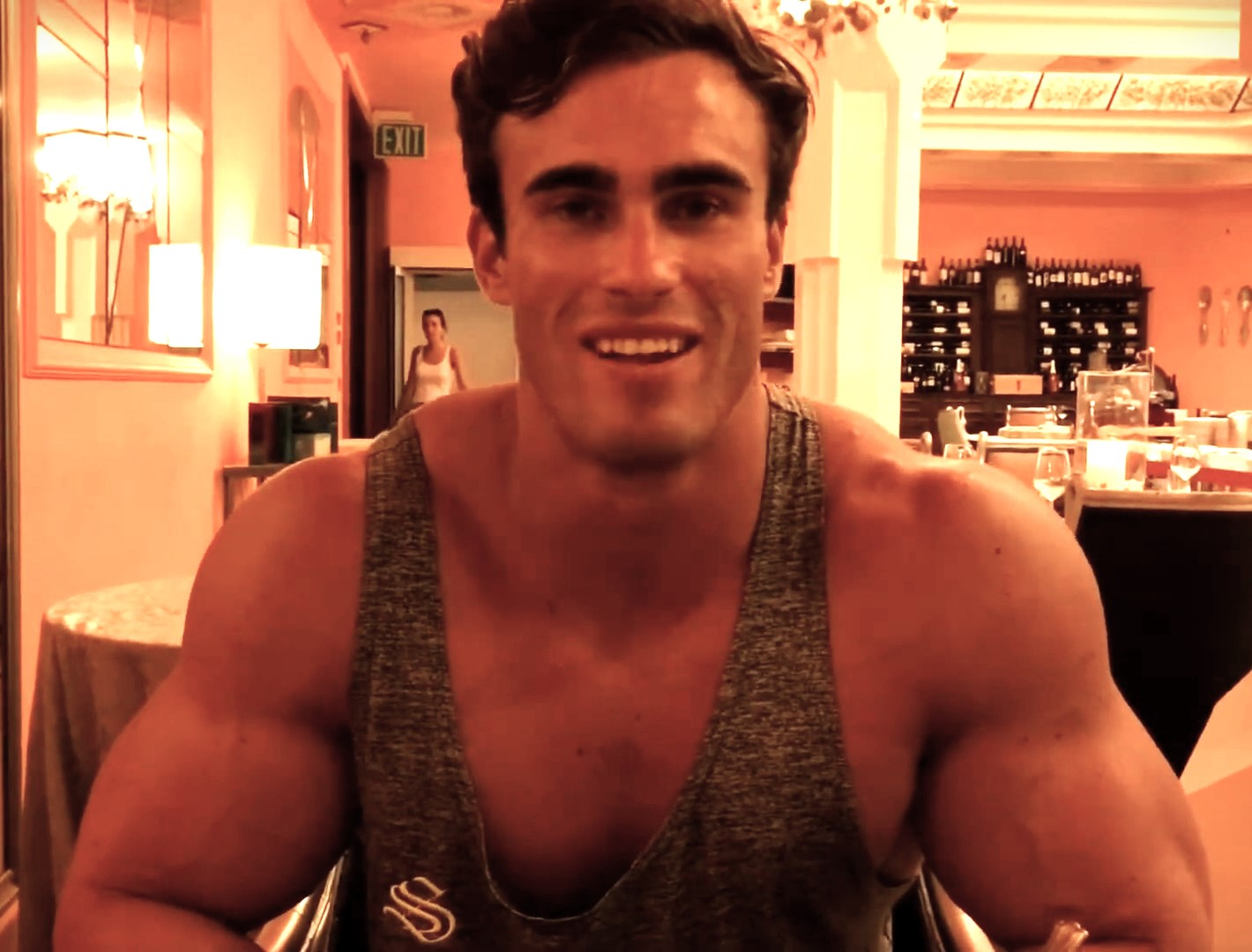
- Von Moger in 2017

Personal info
- Born: Calum Jose Von Moger; 9 June 1990 (age 36); Anglesea, Victoria, Australia

Best statistics
- Height: 6 ft 1.5 in (187 cm)
- Weight: (Stage Weight) 235 lb (106-108 kg) (Off-season) 255-260 lb (117 kg)

Professional (Pro) career
- Pro-debut: WFF Pro Mr Universe; 2015
- Best win: WFF Mr Universe; 2011, 2014, 2015
- Predecessor: Klaus Drescher
- Successor: Rob Borgonha

Calum Jose Von Moger (born 9 June 1990) is an Australian actor and IFBB and WFF/NABBA Pro bodybuilder. He is best known for his portrayal of Arnold Schwarzenegger in the 2018 film, Bigger.

== Bodybuilding career ==
- 1st - NABBA Junior International Championships, 2011, Melbourne
- 3rd - NABBA Junior Southern Hemisphere Championships, 2011, Gold Coast, Australia
- 1st - WFF Junior Mr Universe, 2011, Baden, Austria
- 1st - NABBA Class 1 International Championships in May 2013 in Melbourne
- 3rd - NABBA Class 1 Southern Hemisphere Championships in May 2013 in Gold Coast, Australia
- 5th - WFF Universe – Superbody, 2013, Thessaloniki
- 1st - WFF Mr Universe, 2014, Seoul, South Korea (WFF/NABBA Pro Card)
- 1st - WFF Mr Universe, 2015, La Ciotat, France
- 1st - WFF Pro European Championships, 2015, Tuscany, Italy
- 1st - Venice Muscle Beach Contest, Novice, 2016, Venice Beach, California
- 1st - NPC Irongames Championships, Classic Physique, 2016, Culver City, California
- 1st - NPC Classic Physique Universe, 2020, Charleston, South Carolina (IFBB Pro Card)

== Personal life ==
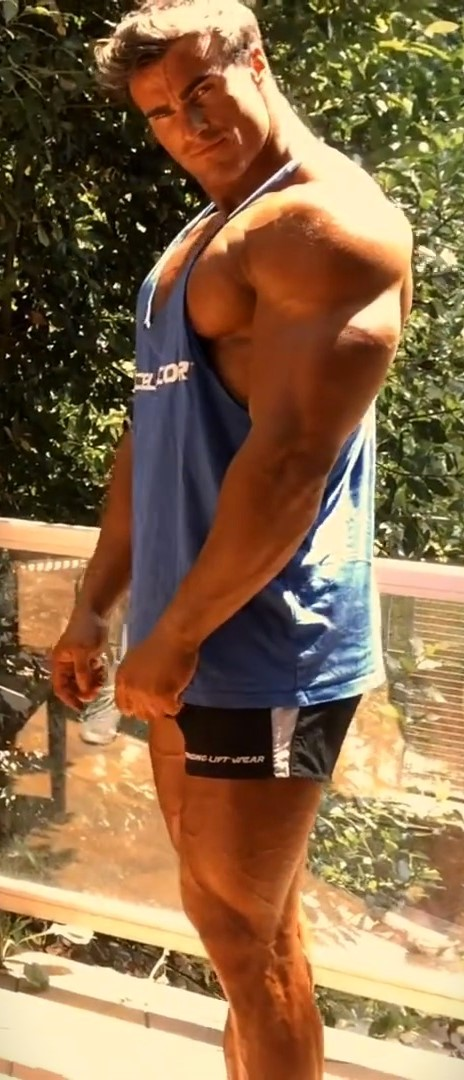
Von Moger in 2017

Von Moger was born on 19 July 1990 in Anglesea, Victoria, Australia and grew up on a farm in Geelong. His family are from Austrian and Dutch descent. He started training at a young age with his older brother and his friend at a local gym which they used to sneak into after hours. After training for a few years, he started his competitive career in NABBA. In his first year he won the amateur Mr Universe and decided to take up bodybuilding full time. Calum has won the Mr Universe title four times.

In October 2014, he moved to Los Angeles where he started working at GNC (store). He began dating model and fitness influencer Karina Elle. Von Moger was signed by Muscular Development Magazine in 2014, and quickly gained the nickname Arnold 2.0 when fans started to compare his physique to that of Arnold Schwarzenegger. He was sponsored by supplement company Cellucor from 2014-2016 and served as the face of the brand, attending expos and events. Von Moger went on to sign an exclusive management contract with Edwin Mejia Jr. Generation Iron. Generation Iron featured Von Moger in 'Generation Iron 2' which showcased on Netflix. He then starred as himself in the biography titled Calum Von Moger: Unbroken, produced and distributed by Generation Iron.

Generation Iron went on to book Von Moger in the 2019 Pre-Fall Gucci Campaign as a model and engaged Calum in the breakout role as a young Arnold Schwarzenegger in the feature film, Bigger. An animal lover, Von Moger has had several pets, including a goldfish named Coleslaw, a dog named Rex and a lizard named Baz.

Von Moger suffered several injuries in a space of six months. In November 2017, he tore his biceps while barbell curling 140 kg in Gold’s Gym, Venice, with Classic Physique Bodybuilder Chris Bumstead. In April 2018, Von Moger tore his quad while rock climbing and was found to have blood clots which resulted in surgery.

He has a son named Kyros (born 2020) who lives in Los Angeles with the mother, Nicola Segura. They had a legal battle over the custody of their child, which was eventually settled.

In 2020, Von Moger returned to competing and won his IFBB Pro card after winning the NPC Universe in Classic Physique.

He ran a supplement company called Staunch, which he closed down in 2021. In October 2021, he moved back to Australia and opened a gym, which soon closed.

On 6 May 2022, Von Moger sustained injuries, requiring ICU treatment, after jumping out an apartment window.

On 26 May 2022, Von Moger pleaded guilty to possession of testosterone, cannabis and methamphetamine. He received a $500 fine from the magistrate and had to undergo rehabilitation.

== Acting career ==
- Generation Iron 2 as himself (2017)
- Bigger as Arnold Schwarzenegger (2018)
- Calum Von Moger: Unbroken as himself (2019)
