= Ben Pakulski =

Canadian bodybuilder

- Professional bodybuilder

Personal info
- Nickname: The Pak-Man; Big Ben; BPak
- Born: March 18, 1981 (age 45); Toronto, Ontario, Canada

Best statistics
- Height: 5 ft 10 in (1.78 m)
- Weight: Contest: 280 lb (130 kg), Off season: 300 lb (140 kg)

Professional (Pro) career
- Pro-debut: Finished 3rd in IFBB, Tampa; 2009
- Best win: Mr. Canada; 2008
- Predecessor: Vincent Wawryk
- Successor: Gregory Ulysse
- Active: 2005-2017

Benjamin "Ben" Pakulski (born March 18, 1981, in Toronto, Ontario), nicknamed the Pak-Man, is a Canadian IFBB professional bodybuilder and winner of the 2008 Mr. Canada competition. In the IFBB, he finished 2nd twice in 2008. He has increased his standing in the Arnold Classic competition, placing 2nd in 2013, after a 4th-place finish in 2012 and a 10th-place finish in 2011. In the 2012 Mr. Olympia contest, his first-ever, he finished 11th.

== Biography ==
According to his website, Pakulski began his interest in nutrition at 14 years old, when he read about vegetarianism and experimented with it for two years. He began weightlifting at 15 in Macks Gym in Toronto. Around that time, he was mentored by Tom Hall, who taught him more effective approach to training and mindset. At the age of 18, Ben secured his first Muscletech contract and was with the company until he turned pro in 2008. Pakulski also credits the deceased Peter Chiasson, a health professional with a background in Engineering and human biomechanics, for leading him toward and intelligent approach to muscle building early in his career. Pakulski began watching professional events at 17, when his father took him to the 1998 Mr Olympia in NYC. He received coaching from Charles Poliquin and Charles Glass, two highly-influential figures in the bodybuilding world. His favorite bodybuilders growing up were Lee Priest and Dorian Yates. Pakulski has two children. He stated in an interview with Team MD Poland that he is Polish, and his father is from Lublin, Poland.

Ben Pakulski attended the University of Western Ontario. On his website, he attributes his relationship with Peter Chiasson and Tom Purvis, as well as his relentless commitment to mastery for making his name "synonymous with an intelligent and healthy approach to bodybuilding." He teaches seminars and coaches aspiring bodybuilders with his education in nutrition and exercise science. As per his website, since November 2012, he has been actively writing courses, articles, and ebooks on bodybuilding.

== Performances ==
Pakulski's first pro-bodybuilding event is generally listed as 2009 at the IFBB in Tampa, Florida. He finished third in that event and qualified for a 2009 Olympia invitation, which he chose to turn down. Pakulski said in a Feb 18, 2013, Bodybuilding.com interview that the dieting necessary to prepare for an event would have cost him valuable training time and energy, and chose to take on only 2 professional events a year in 2008 and 2009. A 2009 feature story on Pakulski alongside Fouad Abiad, entitled "The Canadian Invasion", publicized them on entering the pros internationally. The title came from the potential the two rookies had to overtake professional titles and represent Canada, which has not been known for many bodybuilders.

Muscular Development reviews of Pakulski have commended his legs as sizeable, but his upper body as lacking. A review given in 2009 stated similarly that he had a "Scandinavian look" and "huge legs", but "could stand to have a meatier back." In 2012, Pakulski competed in the Mr. Olympia contest, his first-ever, and won 11th place. He qualified for the 2013 Arnold Classic contest and a writer for Flex magazine speculated that Pakulski would win the contest. The writer justified his prediction by the lack of an incumbent champion, as leading pros Branch Warren (the 2011 and 2012 Arnold winner), the reigning Mr. Olympia Phil Heath, Jay Cutler, Kai Greene, Evan Centopani, and Victor Martinez would be out of the competition. In the article, Dexter Jackson was reasoned to be a serious contender, but his performance in a grueling Masters Olympia contest weeks before would make him vulnerable to a fresh competitor like Pakulski.

== Muscle Insider cover ==
Muscle Insider broke its own rule to display Pakulski on the cover of its magazine in 2012. Scott Welch, its President, stated that the move was to support Pakulski as Canada's #1 IFBB bodybuilder. Welch admitted, "This was the first time we chose a non-Olympia winner for our cover but as a Canadian magazine, we felt it was very fitting to have Ben on it." Welch explicitly told a writer in 2011 that its cover page was reserved to Mr. Olympia winners, saying, "To get on the cover of the best bodybuilding magazine in the industry, you need to win the best bodybuilding competition in the industry! Only winners of the Olympia make it on the cover of Muscle Insider." Welch defended the change in decision, saying that amazing bodybuilders would need to be recognized and he felt that Pakulski was not far from winning the Mr. Olympia crown someday.

== Personal life ==
The July 2013 issue of Muscle Mag reported that Pakulski underwent a hernia surgery for a protrusion that had affected him for years.

== Bodybuilding titles ==
September 2008 - Canadian Championships Overall Winner and Pro Card Victory in Montreal Quebec.

August 2009 - (First Pro Show) - Pro Bodybuilding Weekly, Tampa - 3rd

May 2010 - New York Pro - 7th

February 2011 - FLEX Pro - 5th

March 2011 - Arnold Classic - 10th

March 2011 - Australia Pro - 4th

February 2012 - Flex Pro - 2nd

March 2012 - Arnold Classic - 4th

September 2012 - Mr.Olympia - 11th

March 2013 - Arnold Classic - 2nd

March 2014 - Arnold Classic - 7th

March 2015 - Arnold Classic - 8th

June 2016 - Toronto Pro Show - 4th

July 2016 - Vancouver Pro Show - 1st

== See also ==
- List of male professional bodybuilders
