= Arbouet-Sussaute =

Arbouet-Sussaute Arboti-Zohota
- Commune
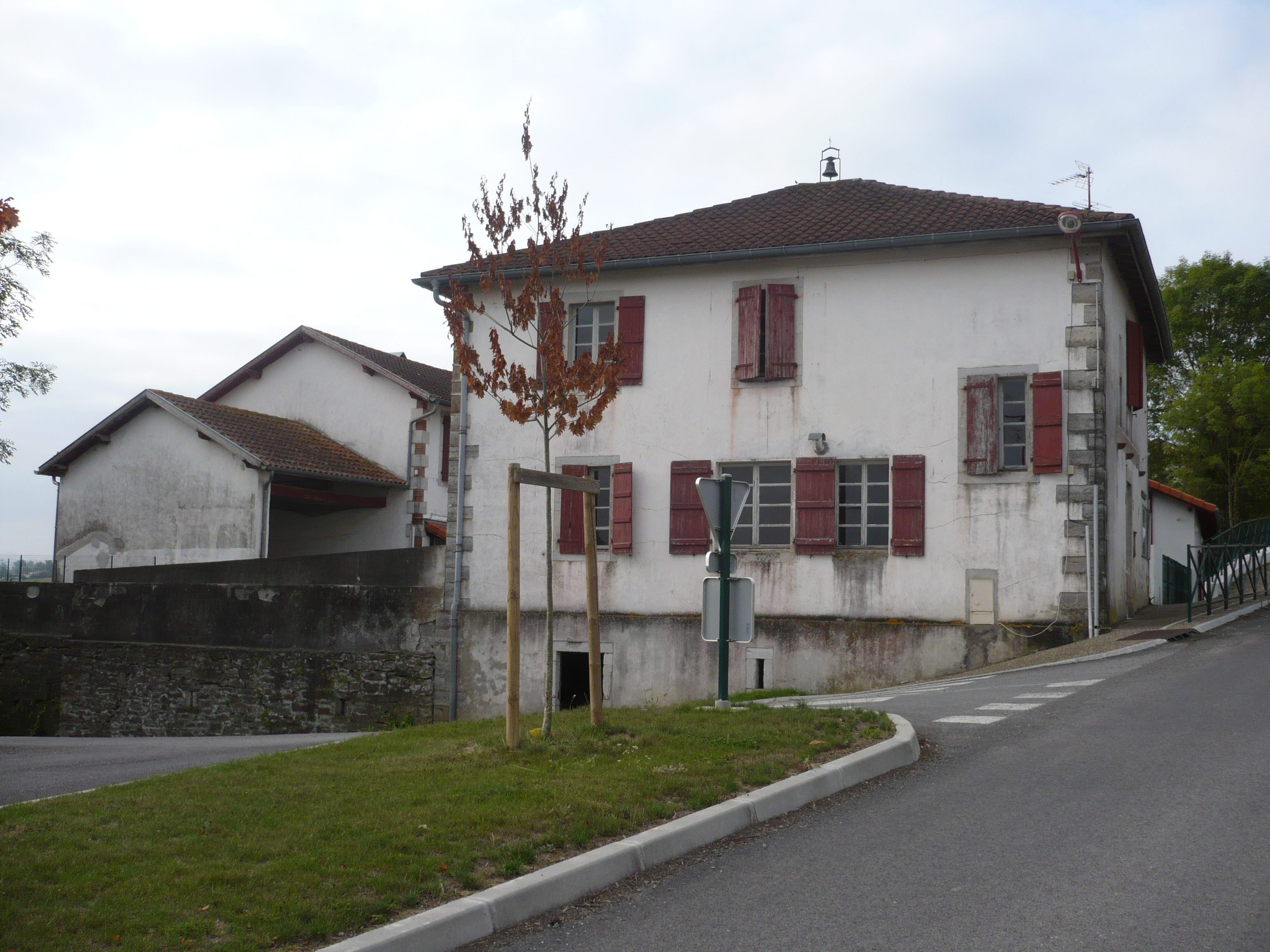
- School (left) and Town Hall

- Coat of arms
- Location of Arbouet-Sussaute
- Location within France Location within Nouvelle-Aquitaine
- Coordinates: 43°22′17″N 1°00′00″W
- Country: France
- Region: Nouvelle-Aquitaine
- Department: Pyrénées-Atlantiques
- Arrondissement: Bayonne
- Canton: Pays de Bidache, Amikuze et Ostibarre
- Intercommunality: CA Pays Basque

Government
  - Mayor (2020–2026): Éric Narbais-Jauréguy
- Area^{1}: 14.55 km^{2} (5.62 sq mi)
- Elevation: 105 m (344 ft)
- Highest elevation: 195 m (640 ft)
- Lowest elevation: 56 m (184 ft)
- Population (2023): 313
  - Density: 21.5/km^{2} (55.7/sq mi)
- Time zone: UTC+01:00 (CET)
  - Summer (DST): UTC+02:00 (CEST)
- INSEE/Postal code: 64036 /64120
- ^{1} French Land Register data, which excludes lakes, ponds, glaciers > 1 km^{2} (0.386 sq mi or 247 acres) and river estuaries.

Arbouet-Sussaute (French pronunciation: [aʁbwɛt sysot]; Basque: Arboti-Zohota; Occitan: Arbouet-Tremolar) is a commune in the Pyrénées-Atlantiques department in the Nouvelle-Aquitaine of south-western France.

The inhabitants of the commune are known as Arbotiar.

== Geography ==
Arbouet-Sussaute is located in the former province of Lower Navarre some 30 km south-east of Peyrehorade and 5 km north-east of Saint-Palais. The D933 road from Saint-Palais in the south-west passes north through the western part of the commune and continues to Osserain-Rivareyte. Access to the village is by the D134 road from the D29 in the north passing south through the village and the commune and continuing south to join the D11 just west of Domezain-Berraute. The intercity bus network of Pyrénées-Atlantiques currently has a stop on its route 865 which goes from Saint-Palais to Orthez. There is also the hamlet of Sussaute to the south-east of the village. A disused line of railway passes from the north to the south-west through the commune.

Located in the Drainage basin of the Adour, the commune is traversed 3 by tributaries of the Bidouze: the Ruisseau de Récalde and the Lauhirasse and its tributary the Berd.

=== Historical places and hamlets ===
- Achtokotcho
- Ahutchunia
- Alguria
- Amensteya
- Arbouet
- Arosteguy
- Arracouenia
- Arracumbeheria
- Arrain
- Beheity
- Bel Air
- Bellaix
- Berhamborda
- Bidetoua
- Bordagnia
- Celhay
- Chapar
- Church of Sussaute
- Copaenia
- Elgart
- Etchart
- Gallos
- Hachgarat
- Harambure
- Idiartia
- Iratchetoa
- Joanconia
- Lacounia
- Landutchia
- Larramendy
- Laugueroteguia
- Léchénia
- Lessaho
- Mendibure
- Mendiscoua
- Mendiskoborda
- Mitchot
- Ochaharretta
- Orania
- Oxobiçale
- Pochulia
- Putchetenia
- Salanbeheria
- Sallaberry
- Saspithurry
- Sussaute
- Urchamendy

== Toponymy ==
The commune name in basque is Arboti-Zohota.

According to Jean-Baptiste Orpustan Arboti is the spelling preserved in basque but the meaning is uncertain. If it is from the Latin (borrowed from arbor(e)), the name may signify a wooded place. For Zohota (Sussaute) he suggests a basque origin of zozoeta meaning "Place of blackbirds".

The following table details the origins of the commune name and other names in the commune.

| Name | Spelling | Date | Source | Page | Origin | Description |
|---|---|---|---|---|---|---|
| Arbouet | Arbet | 1119 | Orpustan | 67 | | Village |
| | Arbut | 1125 | Orpustan | 67 | | |
| | Sanctus martinus de arbut | 1160 | Orpustan | 67 | | |
| | Arbbet | 1268 | Orpustan | 67 | | |
| | Arboet | 1316 | Orpustan | 67 | | |
| | Arboet | 1350 | Orpustan | 67 | | |
| | Arboet | 1413 | Orpustan | 67 | | |
| | Arboet | 1472 | Raymond | 9 | Notaries | |
| | Arbuete | 1621 | Raymond | 9 | Biscay | |
| | Arbuet | 1621 | Raymond | 9 | Biscay | |
| | Arboüet | 1750 | Cassini | | | |
| Sussaute | Sansctus martinus de sosaute | 1160 | Orpustan | 66 | | Village |
| | Sosaute | 1219 | Orpustan | 66 | | |
| | Sosaute | 1350 | Orpustan | 66 | | |
| | Sosaute | 1384 | Raymond | 165 | Navarrenx | |
| | Sossaute | 1405 | Raymond | 165 | Navarrenx | |
| | Sossaute | 1413 | Orpustan | 66 | | |
| | Susauta | 1513 | Raymond | 165 | Pamplona | |
| | Susaute | 1519 | Raymond | 165 | Mixe | |
| | Sußaute | 1750 | Cassini | | | |
| | Sussante | 1793 | Ldh/EHESS/Cassini | | | |
| Beheity | Béhéity | 1863 | Raymond | 26 | | Hamlet |
| Élichetche | Eliceche | 1621 | Raymond | 58 | Biscay | Farm |
| Etcheverry | Etcheverry | 1863 | Raymond | 63 | | Fief falling under the Kingdom of Navarre |
| Mauhourat | Mauhourat | 1863 | Raymond | 110 | Biscay | Hamlet |
| Sallaberry | Salaverri | 1621 | Raymond | 153 | Biscay | Farm |

Sources:

- Orpustan: Jean-Baptiste Orpustan,New Basque Toponymy p. 66-67
- Raymond: Topographic Dictionary of the Department of Basses-Pyrenees, 1863, on the page numbers indicated in the table. (in French)
- Cassini: Cassini Map from 1750
- Ldh/EHESS/Cassini: Des villages de Cassini aux communes d'aujourd'hui: Commune data sheet Sussaute, EHESS (in French).

Origins:

- Notaries: Notaries of Labastide-Villefranche
- Biscay: Martin Biscay
- Navarrenx: Notaries of Navarrenx
- Pamplona: Titles of Pamplona
- Mixe: Titles of Mixe

== History ==
The village of Sussaute was joined with Arbouet on 14 June 1842.

== Administration ==
List of Successive Mayors

| From | To | Name |
|---|---|---|
| 1995 | 2001 | Jean-Marie Larroque |
| 2001 | 2026 | Éric Narbais-Jauréguy |

=== Inter-communality ===
The commune is part of six inter-communal structures:

- The Communauté d'agglomération du Pays Basque;
- the AEP association of Mixe Country;
- the Education regrouping association of Arbérats-Sillègue, Arbouet-Sussaute, Aroue, and Etcharry;
- the Energy association of Pyrénées-Atlantiques;
- the inter-communal association for the functioning of schools in Amikuze;
- the association for the promotion of Basque culture.

== Demography ==
In 1350 there were 11 fires in Sussaute.

The fiscal census of 1412–1413, made on the orders of Charles III of Navarre, compared with the census of men and weapons that are in this Kingdom of Navarre below the ports in 1551 reveals a demography with strong growth. The first indicated the presence in Arbouet of 12 fires, the second with 31 (24 + 7 secondary fires). Similarly in Sussaute, the census of 1412-1413 had 7 fires while that of 1551 had 23 (19 + 4 side lights).

The census of the population of Lower Navarre in 1695 counted 52 fires in Arbouet and 50 in Sussaute.

The population data given in the table and graph below include the former commune of Sussaute, absorbed in 1842.

Historical population

| Year | Pop. | ±% p.a. |
|---|---|---|
| 1793 | 615 | — |
| 1821 | 572 | −0.26% |
| 1846 | 510 | −0.46% |
| 1872 | 475 | −0.27% |
| 1901 | 437 | −0.29% |
| 1926 | 373 | −0.63% |
| 1946 | 368 | −0.07% |
| 1962 | 320 | −0.87% |
| 1968 | 324 | +0.21% |

| Year | Pop. | ±% p.a. |
|---|---|---|
| 1975 | 293 | −1.43% |
| 1982 | 289 | −0.20% |
| 1990 | 252 | −1.70% |
| 1999 | 227 | −1.15% |
| 2007 | 253 | +1.36% |
| 2012 | 296 | +3.19% |
| 2017 | 322 | +1.70% |
| 2023 | 313 | −0.47% |

Source: EHESS and INSEE

== Economy ==
The commune is part of the Appellation d'origine contrôlée (AOC) zone of Ossau-iraty.

== Culture and Heritage ==
=== Religious heritage ===
The Parish Church of Saint John the Baptist (1860) is registered as an historical monument.

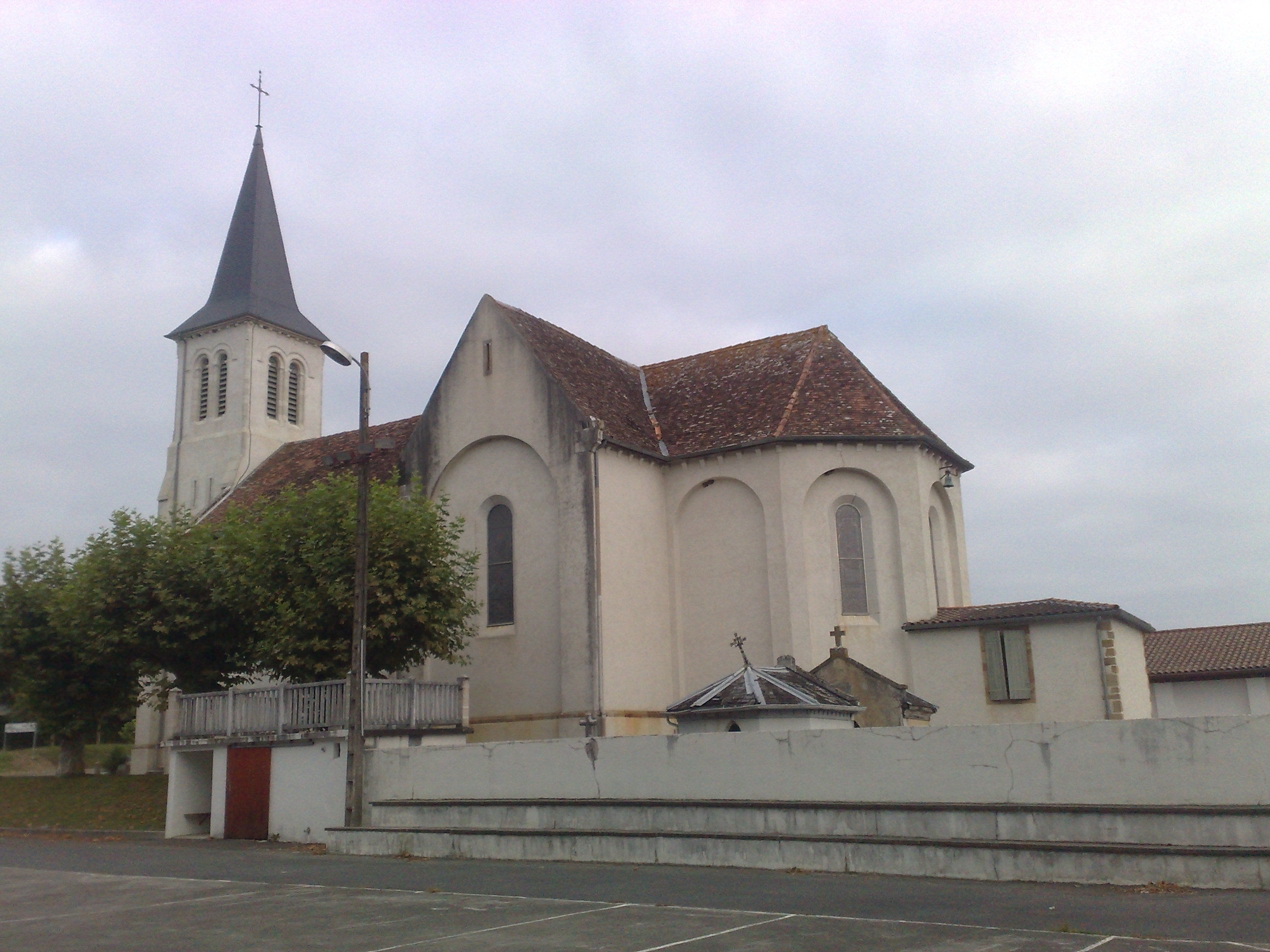
The church front

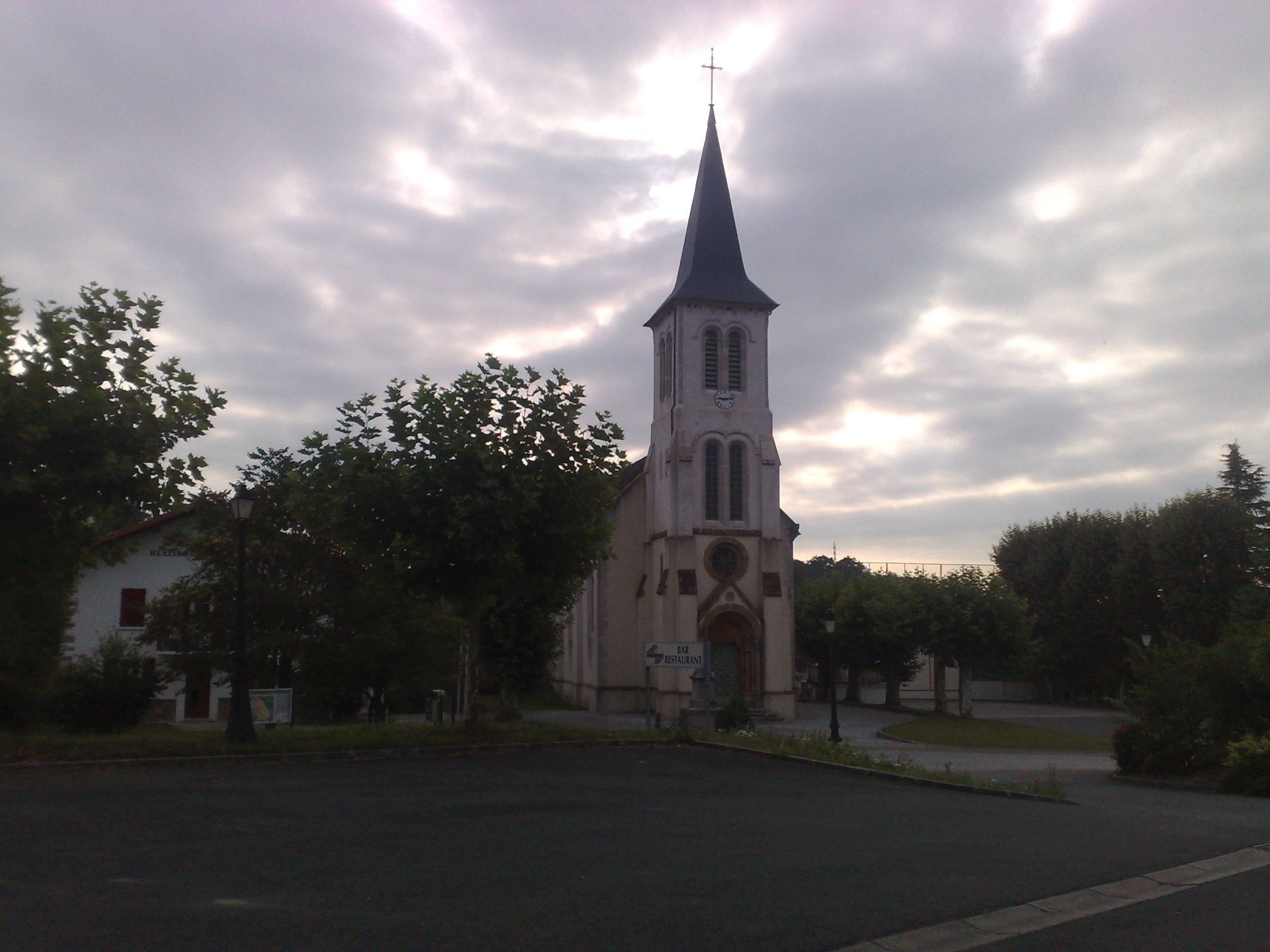
The Church Steeple

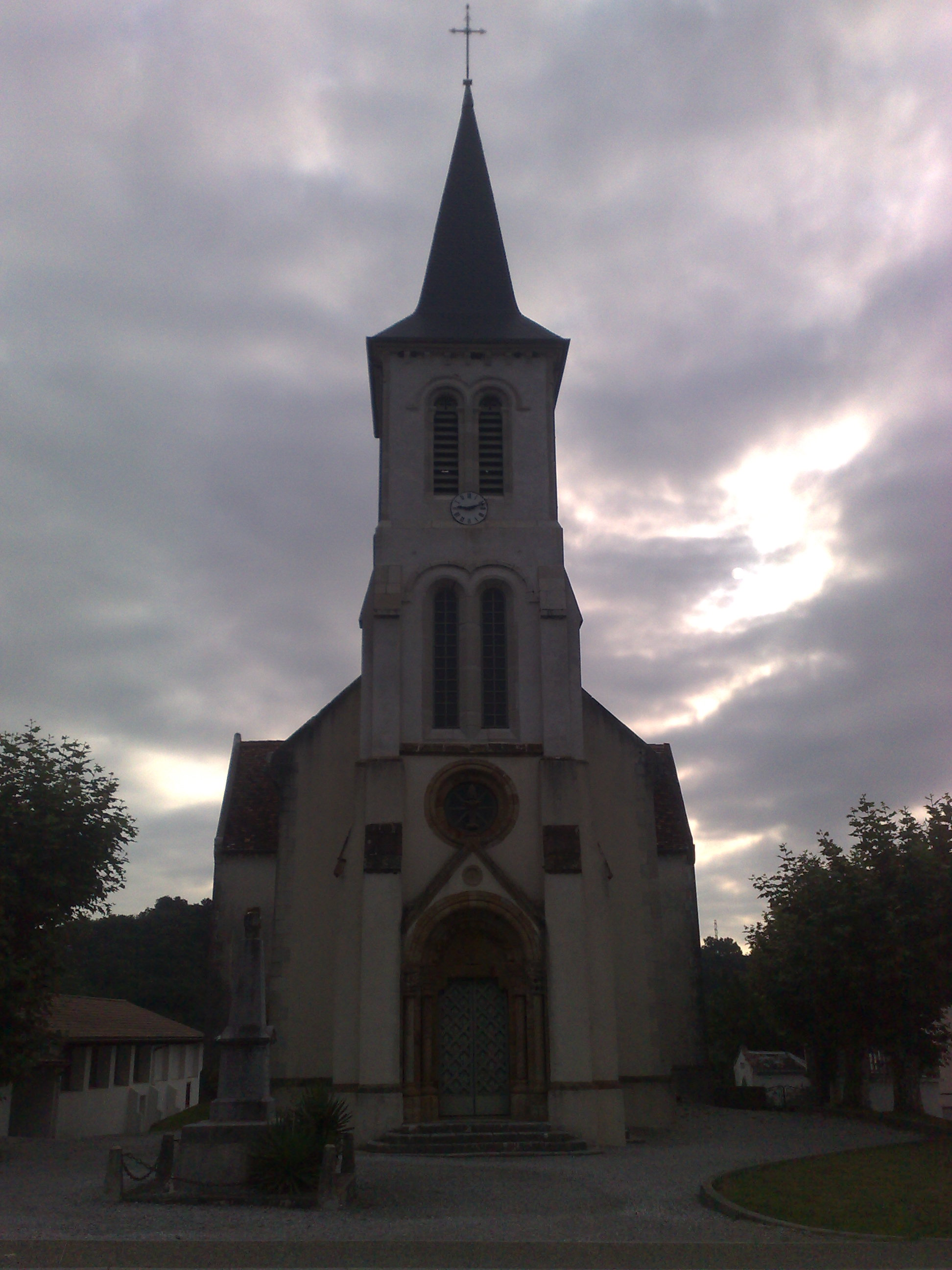
The Church Steeple and War Memorial

== Amenities ==
=== Education ===
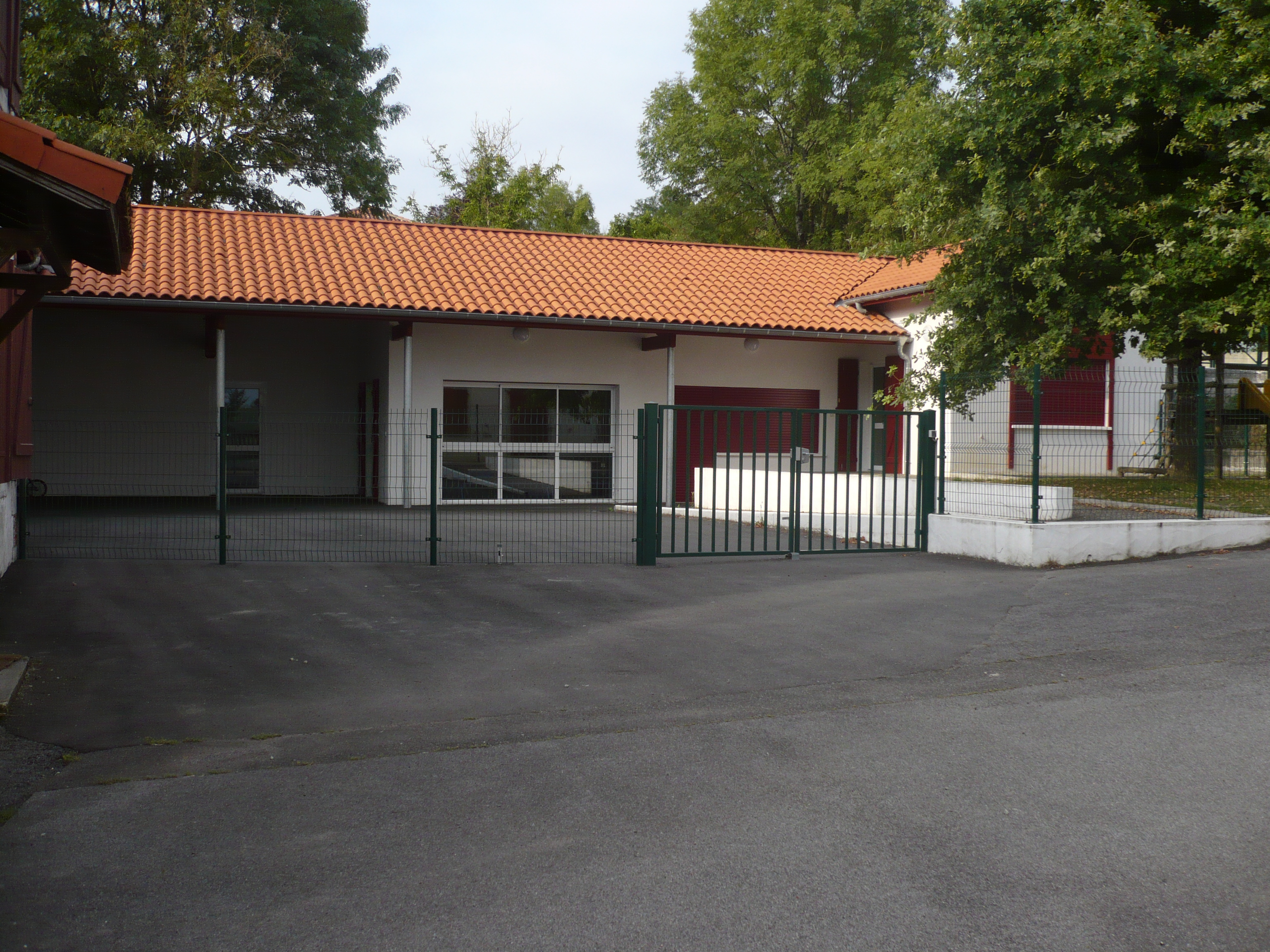
The school in Arbouet

The town has a kindergarten.

== Picture Gallery ==
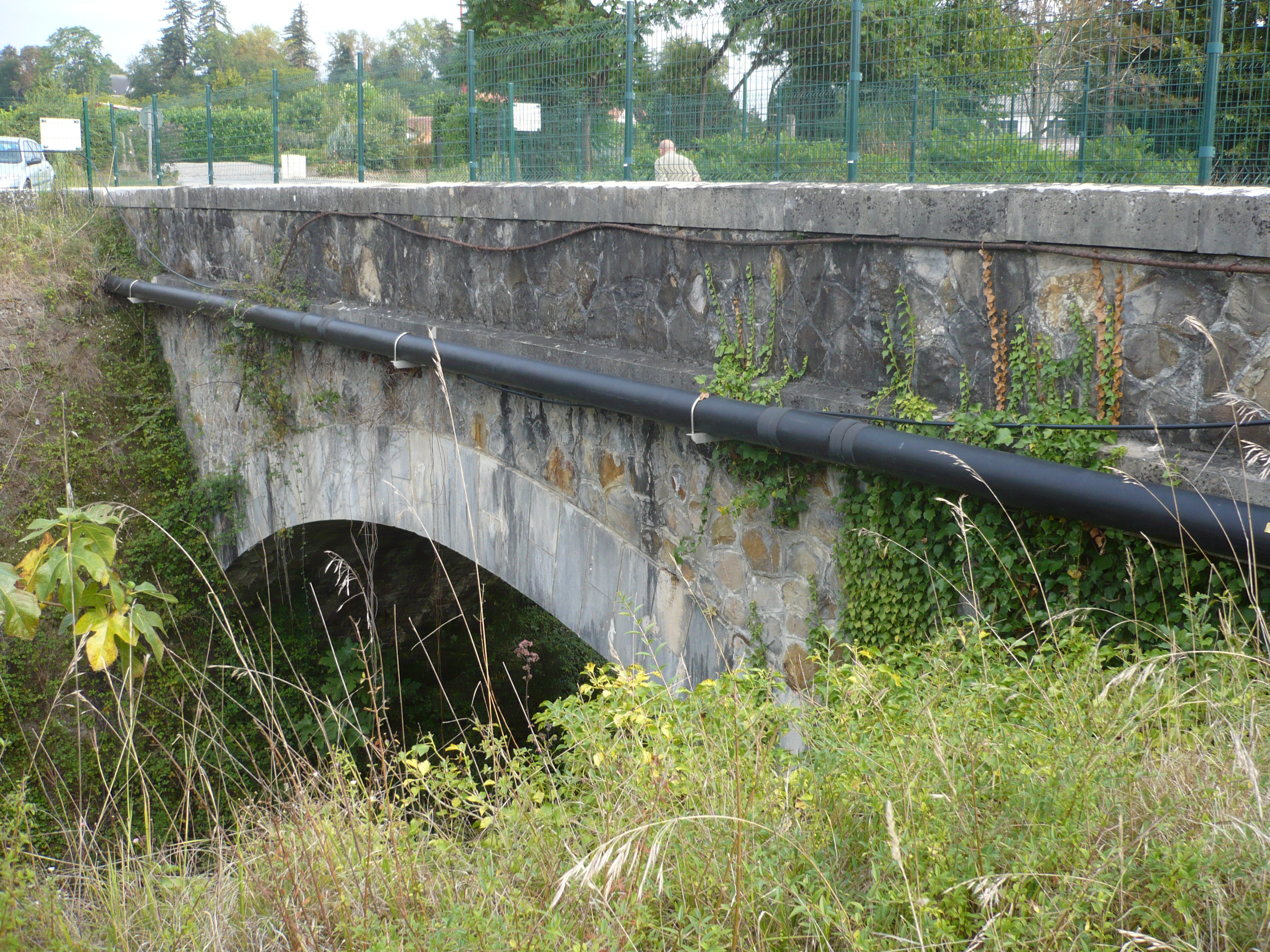
D134 road bridge over the old railway cutting

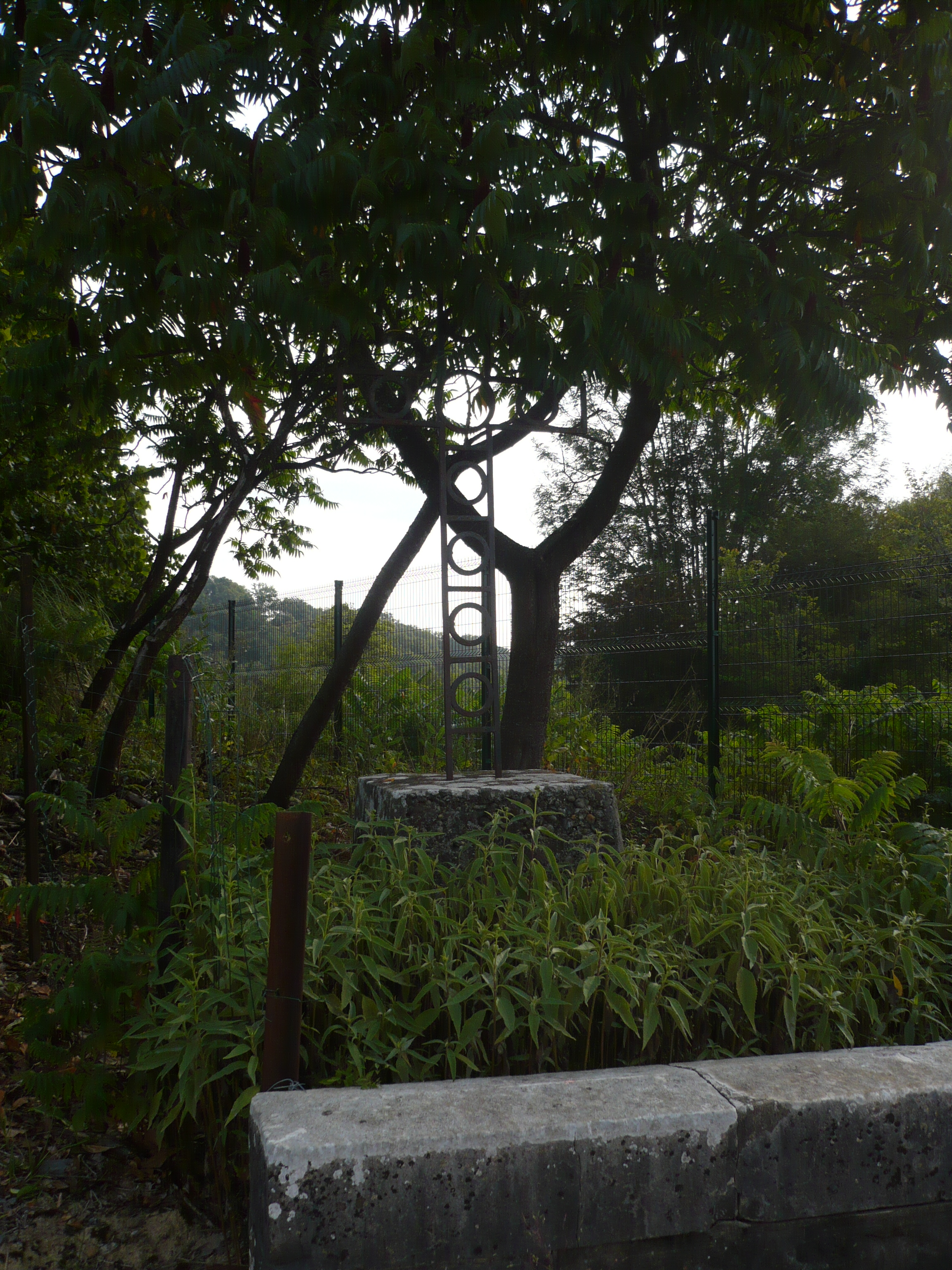
A cross near the railway cutting

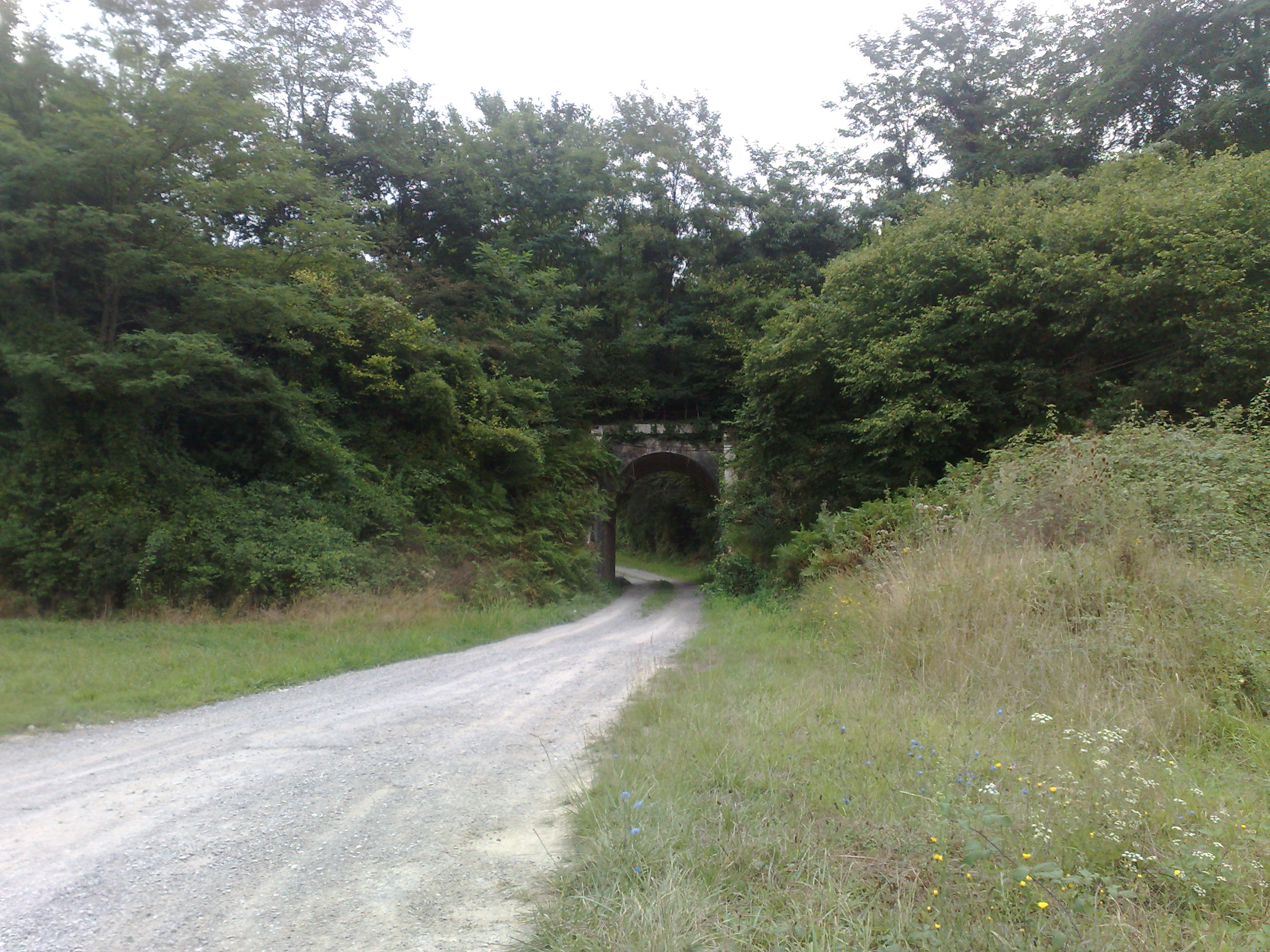
Old railway bridge near the D134 road

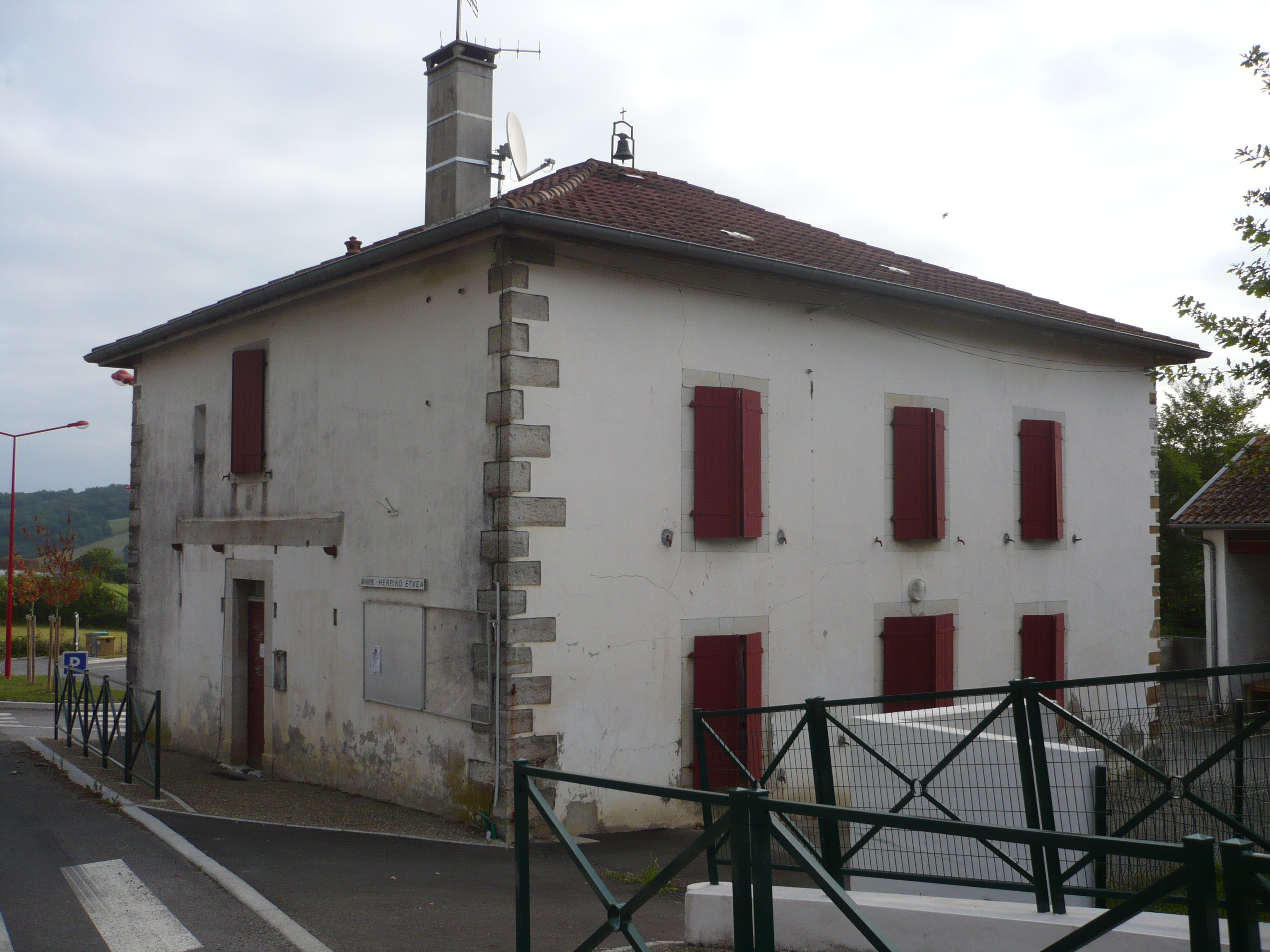
Town Hall

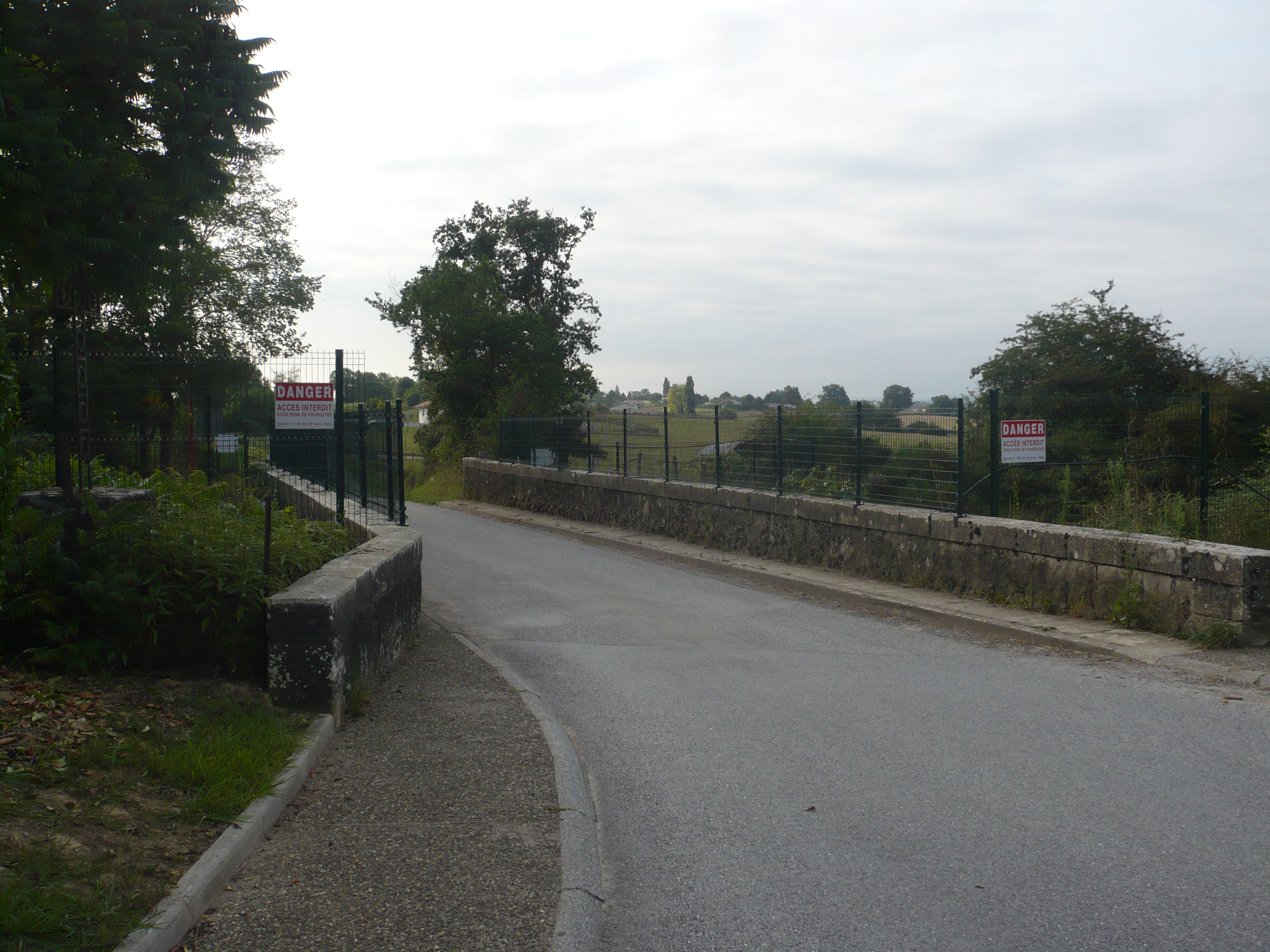
Towards Sussaute in the distance

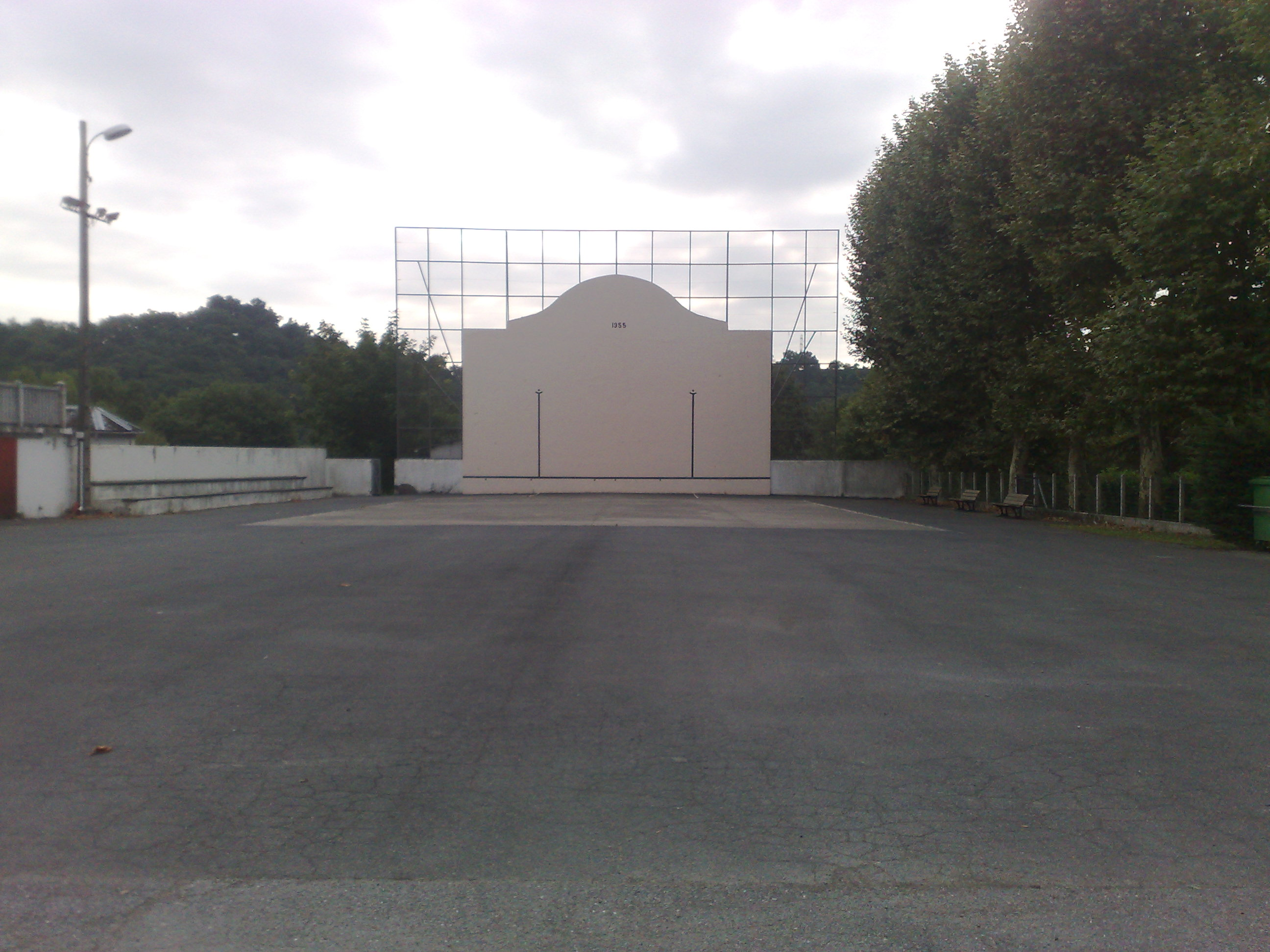
The Fronton

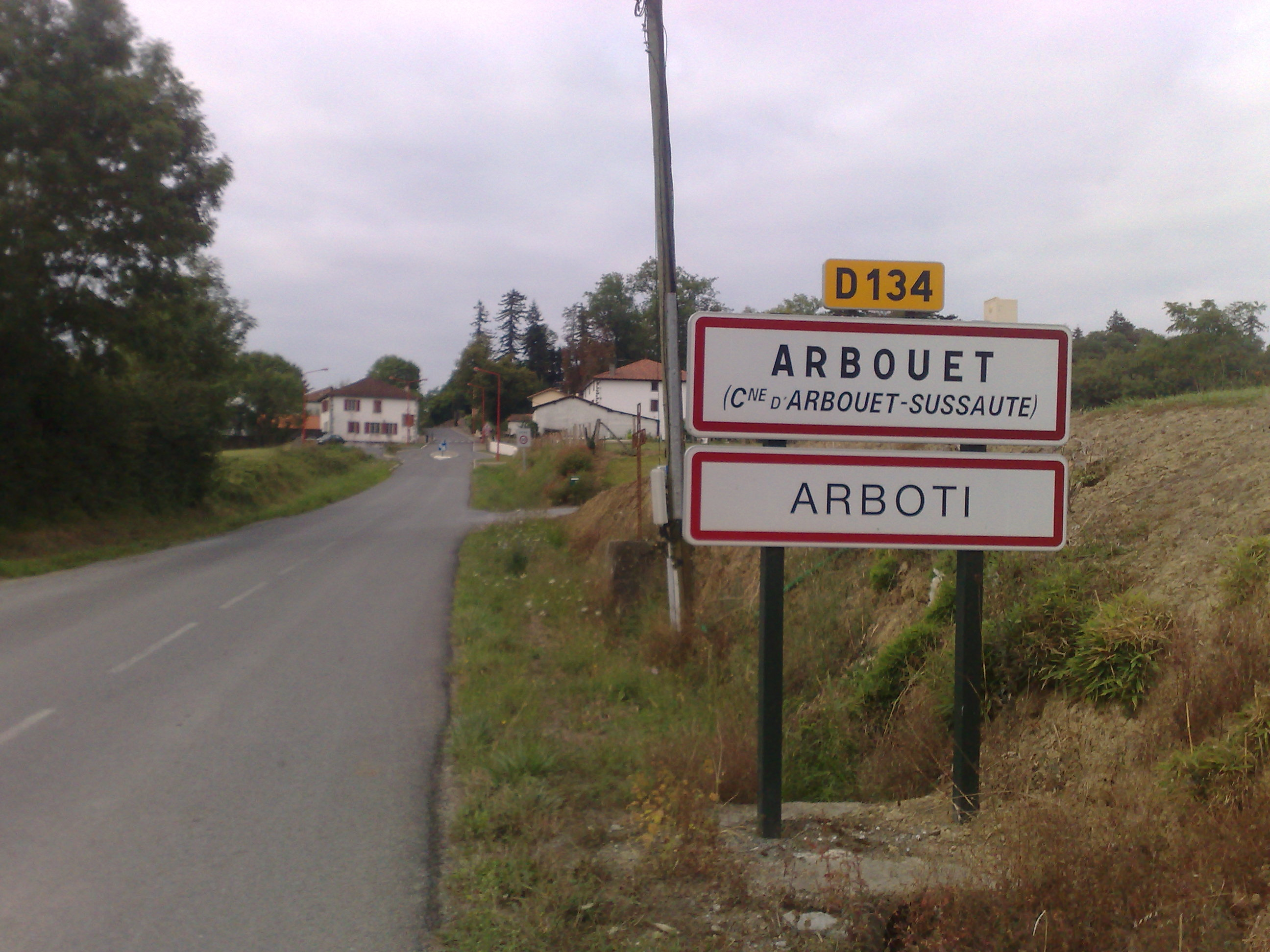
Entrance to Arbouet

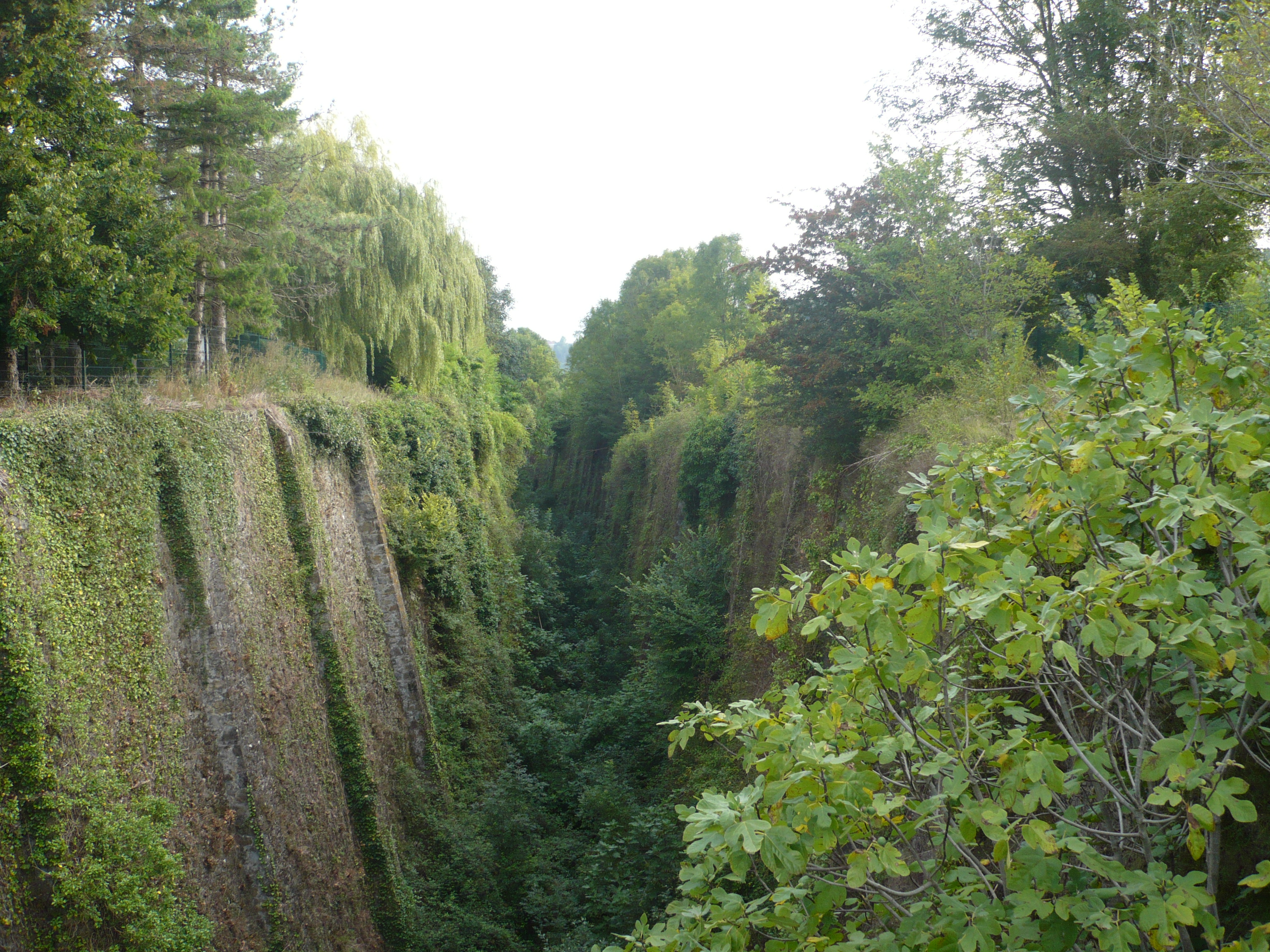
Old railway cutting

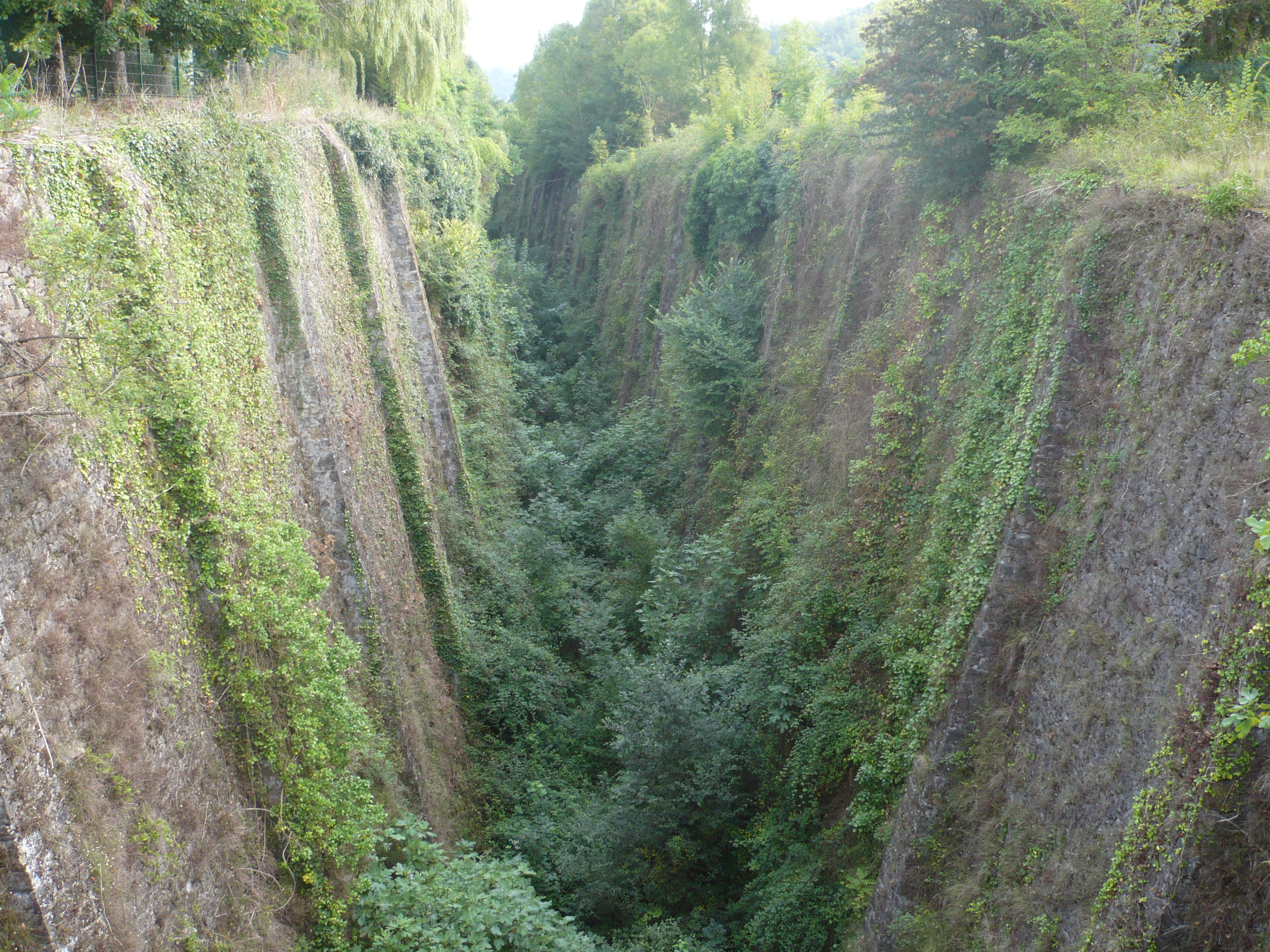
Old railway cutting

== See also ==
- Communes of the Pyrénées-Atlantiques department
