= Kevin Arbouet =

American film director

- Born: Kevin Daniel Arbouet; May 29, 1977 (age 49); Brooklyn, New York, U.S.
- Occupations: Film director; producer

Kevin Daniel Arbouet is an American director, writer, and producer. He was born May 29, 1977, in Brooklyn, New York. He and his partner Larry Strong directed the viral video I Got a Crush... on Obama, and in 2017, Arbouet cooperated with Food Tank to create a theatrical workout series.

== Filmography ==
Year	Film	Director	Producer	Notes
2006	An Americ [sic] Guide to Kicking Terrorism's Ass!	No	Yes	
2007	Serial	Yes	Yes	Co-directed with Larry Strong, also screenwriter
2007	I Believe in America	No	Yes	Co-producer
2008	Last Day of Summer	No	Yes	
2014	Police State	Yes	No	
2016	Fair Market Value	Yes	No	Also screenplay
2016	Cassanova Was a Woman	Yes	No	
2017	Police State	Yes	No	Also writer
2018	Benji the Dove	Yes	No	Also writer
2022	Showrunner, True Love	No	No	Wondery/Amazon
2023	Gridiron Grind	Yes	No	
2024	MOVE: The Untold Story of an American Tragedy	Yes	Yes	Podcast series
2024	Toxic Harmony	Yes	No	

=== Television ===
- 2008 : Strokes : Co-director and Co-Producer with Larry Strong
- 2013: The 49th Annual Mr Olympia
