= Vlad Yudin =

Russian filmmaker (born 1982)

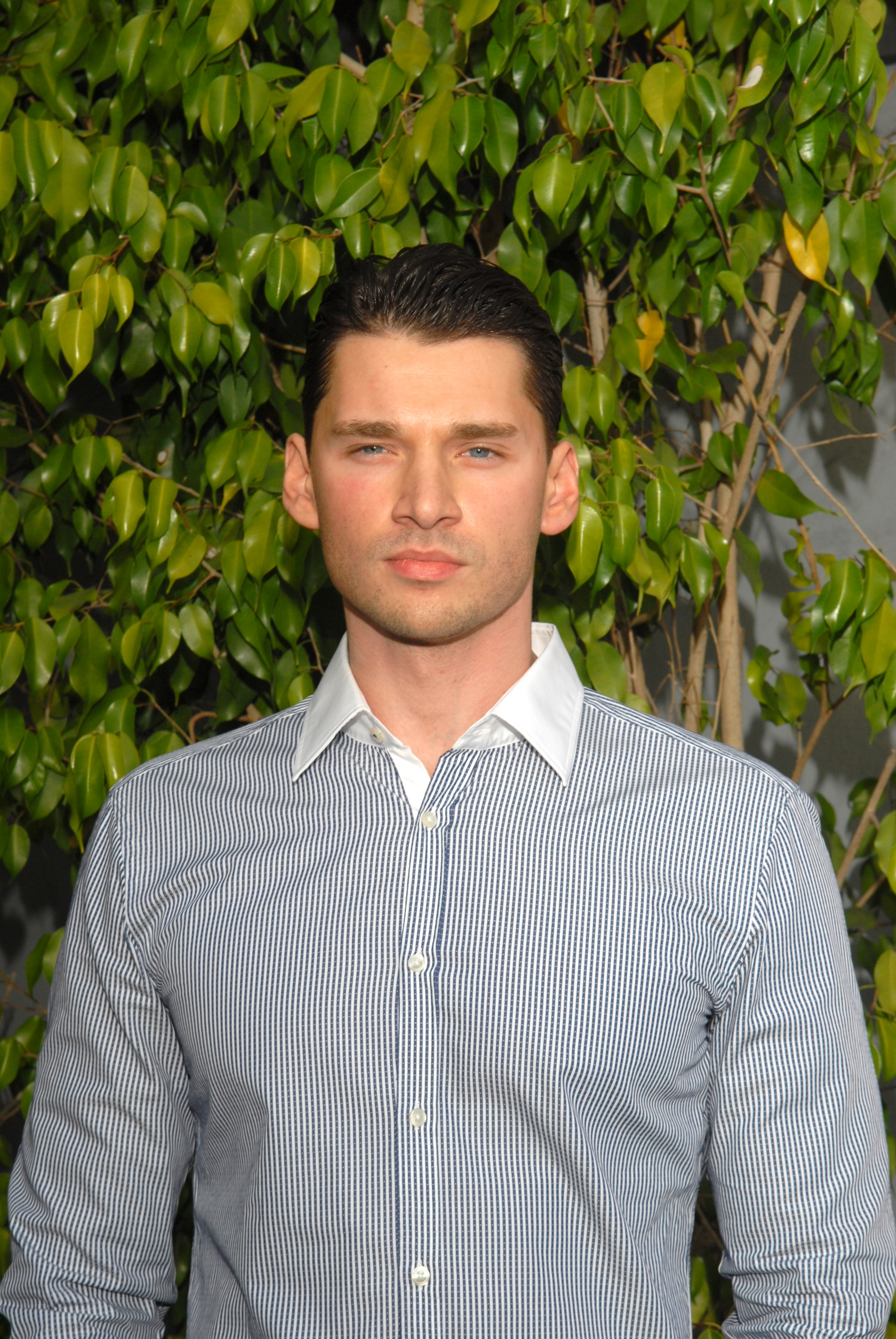
- Yudin in October 2011
- Born: October 26, 1982 (age 42); Russia
- Occupation: Filmmaker

Vlad Yudin (Russian: Влад Юдин; born 26 October 1982) is a Russian filmmaker. He is best known for his work in the United States, where he has made documentaries about topics such as hip-hop music, bodybuilding, and MMA.

== Filmography ==
- Big Pun: The Legacy (2008)
- Last Day of Summer (2009)
- Mr Immortality: The Life and Times of Twista (2011)
- Generation Iron (2013)
- Catskill Park (2014)
- Own3d (2014)
- Jeremy Scott: The People's Designer (2015)
- CT Fletcher: My Magnificent Obsession (2015)
- The Hurt Business (2016)
- Generation Iron 2 (2017)
- Generation Iron 3 (2018)
- Ronnie Coleman: The King (2018)
- Enhanced (2019)

=== As a producer only ===
- Police State (2014)
- Head Smash (2014)

== Bibliography ==
- Head Smash (2013, Arcana Studio, ISBN 1771351624)
