= Center Theatre (Dover-Foxcroft) =

Theatre in Maine, United States

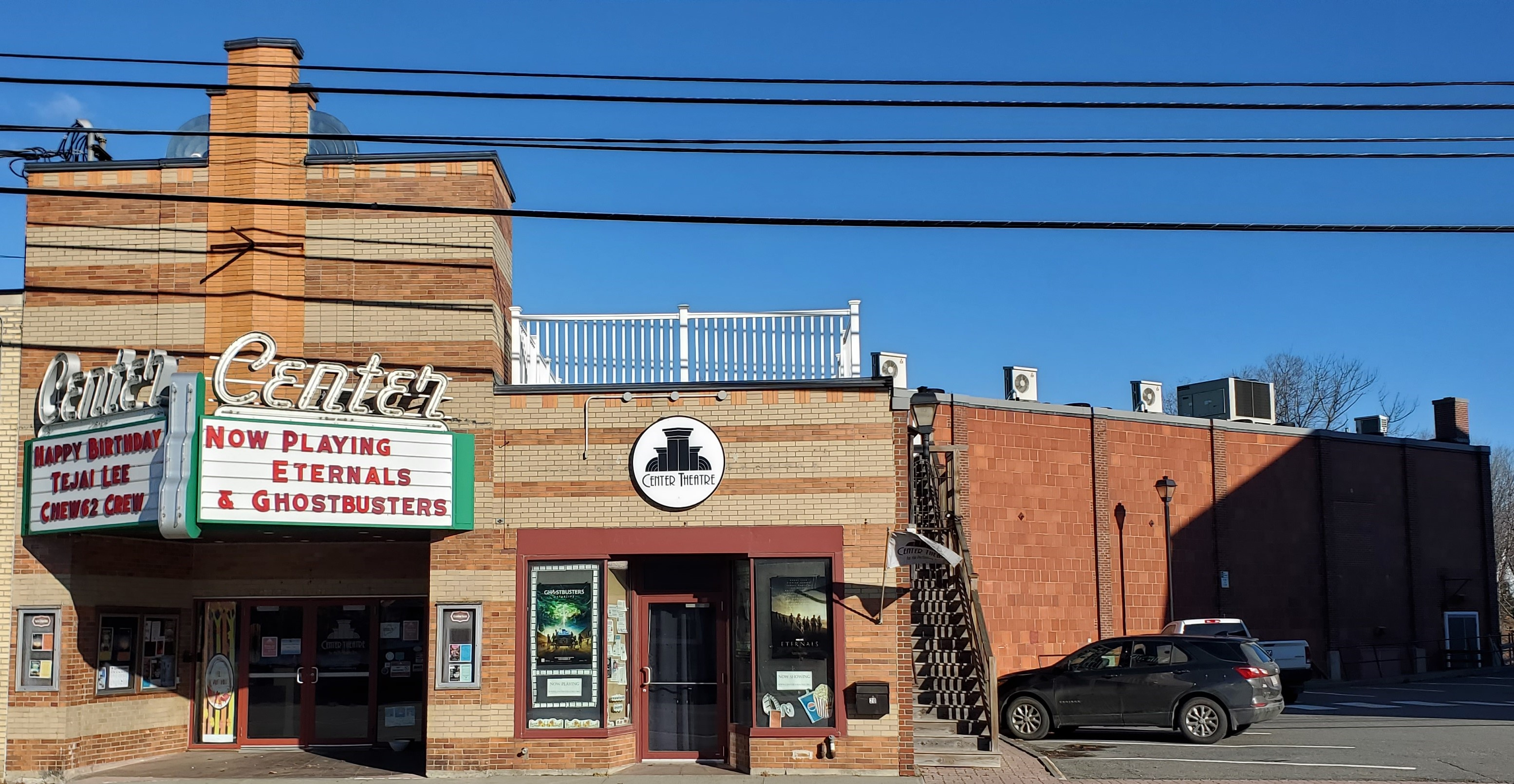
- Interactive map of Center Theatre
- Address: 20 East Main Street; Dover-Foxcroft, Maine; United States
- Coordinates: 45.184109°N 69.229087°W
- Capacity: 264 and 40
- Type: Performing Arts Center

Construction
- Opened: June 6, 1940

Website
- www.centertheatre.org

The Center Theatre is a performing arts venue and movie theater located at 20 East Main Street in Dover-Foxcroft, Maine. The theater was built in 1940 and was closed for several decades before being renovated and revived in the early 2000s. Its main auditorium contains 264 seats, while its second auditorium contains 40 seats. The Theatre hosts live stage performances, music concerts, community events, and movies. Its second screen was completed in February, 2021.

== History ==
Following the destruction by fire of the previous theater in town, the New Star, the Center Theatre was built in 1940. The grand opening took place on June 6, 1940. The 1950s saw the theater go into decline. The theater continued to run until 1971, when it shut its doors.

From its shutdown until its revival, several businesses such as restaurants, video arcades and retail stores used the Theatre's lobby while the auditorium was abandoned.

In 1998, the non-profit Center Theatre Group, later to become Center Theatre, Inc., was formed by a group of local citizens with the purpose of protecting the landmark and renovating it into a performing arts center. Renovations to the structure included structural repairs to concrete supports below the auditorium, new entry doors, installation of a sprinkler system, new plumbing, electrical, and HVAC systems. The stage was expanded and a lighting catwalk was installed. The projection booth was reconfigured to house a single 35mm projector and platter system as well as theatrical spotlights.

The original marquee was taken down in 1974 for fear of its collapse. The marquee was then recreated by NeoKraft Signs of Lewiston, Maine and rehung on Oct. 29, 2004. It was then unveiled in a lighting ceremony in December 2004, 30 years after the original was taken down. In 2016 the front panels of the marquee were converted from fluorescent lights to LEDs during a major energy efficiency and weatherization project through the Grants to Green Maine Program.

The newly renovated theater, now branded the Center Theatre for the Performing Arts, had its grand opening in August, 2006, just 66 years after its first grand opening. The first movie shown by the theater, in April 2007, was Gone With the Wind, chosen because the theater was not built in time to screen it in 1940.

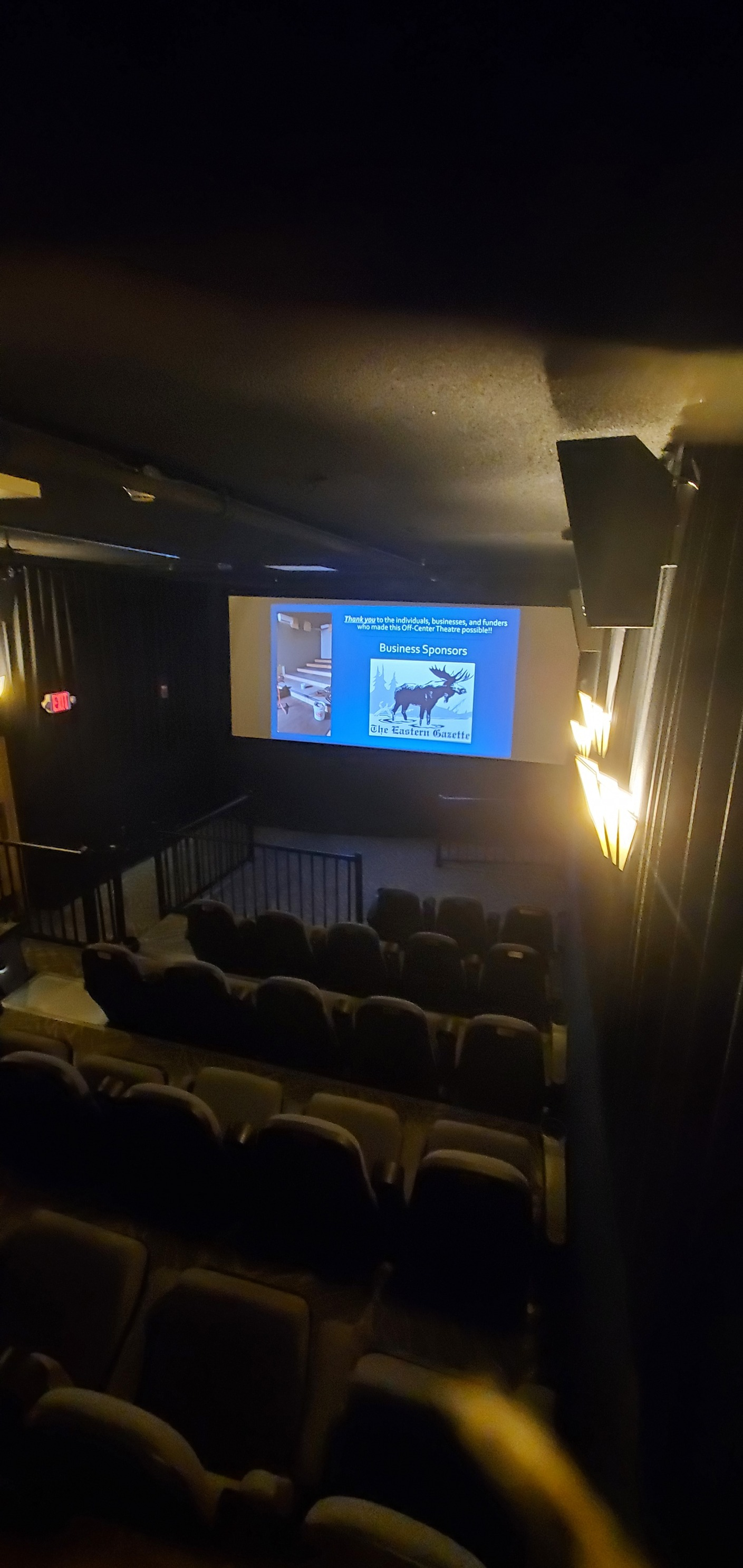
A picture taken from the rear of the second screen's auditorium.

In 2013, with support from the community and foundation grants, the Center Theatre purchased and installed a Christie Solaria One digital projector. The Theatre's 35mm projector is now on display in the Theatre lobby and holds a time capsule sealed into the projector in 2016 as part of the Theatre's 10-year anniversary celebrations.

In February, 2021, construction was completed on a second screen. The 40-seat "Off-Center Theatre" allowed the Theatre to schedule more first-run movies along with documentaries, independent films, and Maine-made movies.

On May 22, 2021, the Center Theatre was awarded the Golden Apple Award by the Maine Education Association. The award is given "[t]o recognize an individual or group that has demonstrated a strong commitment to the local school(s) and/or to the children of a community."

== Slightly Off-Center Players ==
The Slightly Off-Center Players is the community theater group closely associated with the Theatre that produces live productions. Past productions at the Theatre include Fiddler on the Roof, A Christmas Carol, Little Shop of Horrors, The Sound of Music, and others. Shows have featured adult, children, and mixed casts.

The group also organizes educational opportunities such as summer and vacation drama camps for children. In September, 2021, the Theatre began offering an after-school arts and theatre program for high school students.

== Whoopie Pie Festival ==
The Center Theatre organizes the Maine Whoopie Pie Festival annually. It regularly draws over 8,000 people to downtown Dover-Foxcroft. The festival features whoopie pie samples from various bakers across Maine. Also present are live bands, children's activities and local vendors.

== Commercial Historic District ==
In September 2021 the Center Theatre led a successful initiative to create a National Commercial Historic District in downtown Dover-Foxcroft. The District covers East Main Street from the Piscataquis River Bridge to just past the Observer Building. The District provides tax benefits for owners interested in renovating their property and grant opportunities to non-profits within the district.
