= University of Waterloo Stratford School of Interaction Design and Business =

Satellite campus of the University of Waterloo

Stratford School of Interaction Design and Business
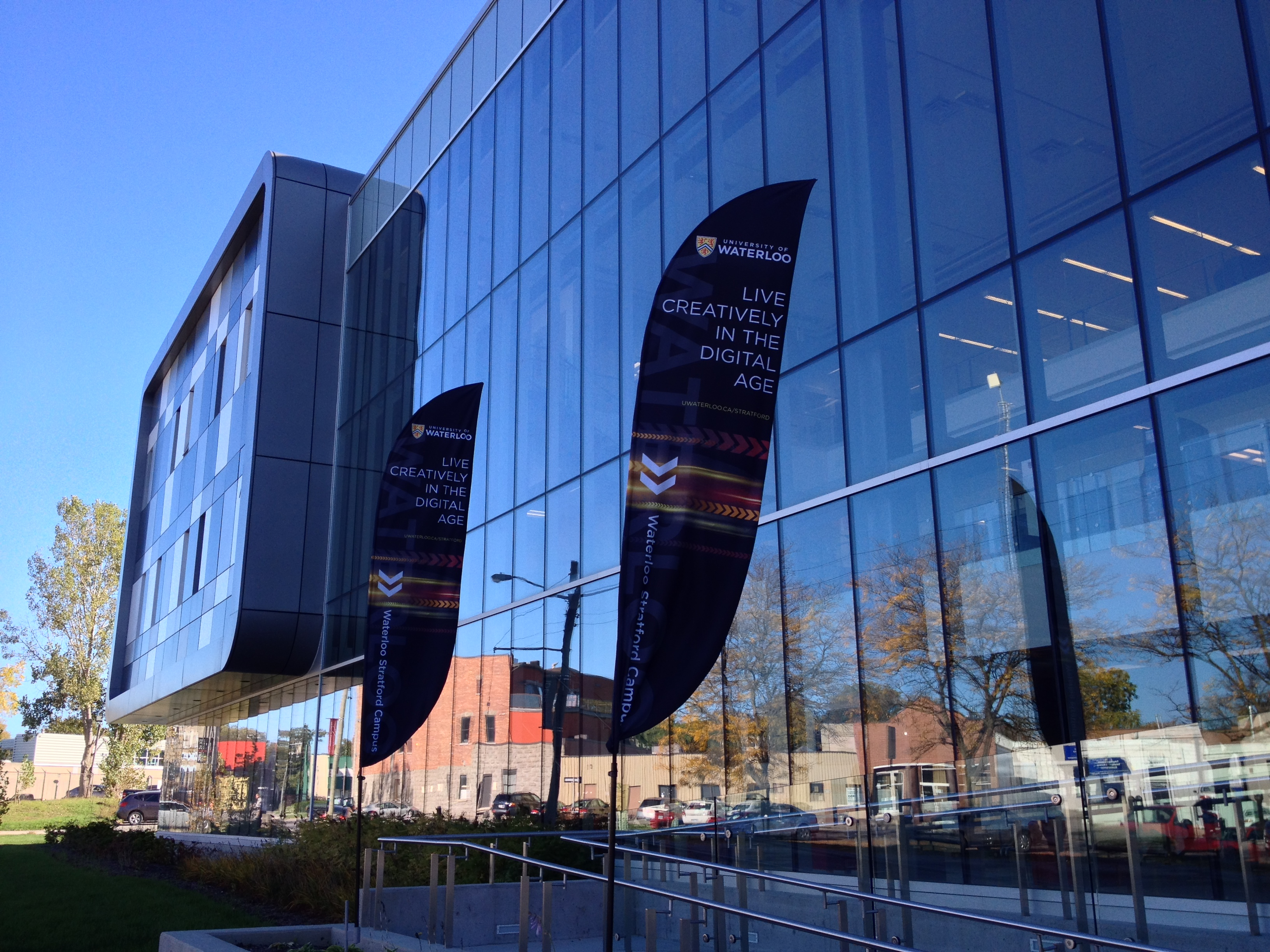
- Established: June 2009
- Parent institution: University of Waterloo Faculty of Arts
- Director: Jessica Thompson
- Location: 125 St. Patrick Street, Stratford, Ontario, Canada; 43.3680°N 80.98177°W
- Website: uwaterloo.ca/stratford

The Stratford School of Interaction Design and Business, also known as the University of Waterloo Stratford School and formerly the University of Waterloo Stratford Campus, is a satellite campus of the University of Waterloo located in Stratford, Ontario, Canada.

Founded in June 2009, the University of Waterloo Stratford School is part of the Faculty of Arts, established to provide programs that focus on digital media, interaction design, digital technologies, content creation and user experience within a business context.

== Stratford School ==
The University of Waterloo Stratford School of Interaction Design and Business is located at 125 St. Patrick Street. The building is a three-storey, 42,000 square-foot space that features digital media labs, user research labs, sound suites, project rooms, open-concept collaboration spaces and software for design, interaction design, photography, video production, app development and web development.

== Academics and programs ==
The University of Waterloo Stratford School prepares students for careers in the area of digital media and design. Students are brought together with faculty, researchers, cultural organizations, business and entrepreneurs through coursework and project-based learning.

=== Master of Digital Experience Innovation (MDEI) ===
Offered at the University of Waterloo Stratford School, the Master of Digital Experience Innovation (MDEI) programme began in fall 2011. It is made up of both recent university graduates and working professionals that want to expand their skills. MDEI is a professional degree that offers project-based learning and a multidisciplinary set of courses, complete with the education portion of the Project Management Professional certification. The MDEI is offered on a full-time or part-time basis. The full-time program occurs over three consecutive terms: fall, winter and spring, while part-time students take two courses per term over 24 months, with a final project in the last spring term of their program.

=== Honors Bachelor of Global Business and Digital Arts (GBDA) ===
The Global Business and Digital Arts programme began in the fall of 2012. It is unique to the Stratford School of Interaction Design and Business. Students are involved in hands-on projects with industry partners and have access to the latest digital technologies. In addition, they complete a paid practicum and are able to earn the educational hours to qualify for the Certificate in Associated Project Management accreditation. On 21 June 2018, Canadian Design Firm Rossul had named the Stratford School of Interaction Design and Business "Best Canadian Undergraduate UX Design University".

== History ==
On 16 October 2006, the city council of the City of Stratford authorized Mayor Dan Mathieson to sign a memorandum of agreement with the Stratford Festival and the University of Waterloo to explore the possibility of having a liberal arts college located in Stratford.

The Province of Ontario granted $10 million to the University of Waterloo Stratford Stratford Campus on 26 March 2008. The following day, Waterloo-based enterprise software company OpenText announced that they had committed $10 million to the project.

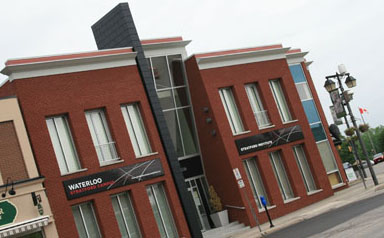
The University of Waterloo Stratford Campus was originally located at 6 Wellington St. in Stratford, Ontario.

In 2008, the inaugural Canada 3.0 conference was hosted by the University of Waterloo Stratford School in Stratford, Ontario with over 1,500 attendees discussing how to make Canada a world leader in the digital economy.

On 22 January 2009, the federal government announced that it was pledging $10.7 million over five years for the Corridor for Advancing Canadian Digital Media - now known as the Canadian Digital Media initiative under the Canadian Digital Media Network (CDMN) – a joint initiative between Communitech and University of Waterloo Stratford Campus. In June of the same year, the first ever Canada 3.0 forum in Stratford, ON was hosted by the University of Waterloo Stratford Campus and CDMN. The event was the official launch of the University of Waterloo Stratford Campus.

The official opening of the campus took place on 20 September 2010 at its temporary location at 6 Wellington St., Stratford, Ontario. The first class of the Master of Digital Experience Innovation (MDEI) – an interdisciplinary, professional one-year program - began at the temporary campus the following year.

On 1 August 2011, Dr. Christine McWebb, Professor in the Department of French Studies, UW becomes the Director, Academic Programs and on 1 October 2011, Ginny Dybenko, the former Dean of the Wilfrid Laurier School of Business & Economics, becomes the Executive Director of the University of Waterloo Stratford Campus.

In January 2012, a part-time Master of Digital Experience Innovation option was added. The program integrated a Project Management Professional certification component into the curriculum for all students.

The first class of the Honors Bachelor of Global Business and Digital Arts program began their studies on 5 September 2012 at the new campus located at 125 St. Patrick St. On 16 October 2012 the building was officially unveiled to the community.

On 15 November 2013 it was announced that University of Waterloo Stratford Campus would receive approximately $1.75 million in federal funding to strengthen the Stratford Accelerator Centre over the next five years. The centre provides mentorship and coaching for tech-related startups, including those launched by University of Waterloo Stratford Campus faculty and students. Stratford Accelerator Centre relocated to University of Waterloo Stratford Campus in spring 2014.

On 1 July 2018, the University of Waterloo Stratford Campus became the Faculty of Arts' newest school, with its new name "Stratford School of Interaction Design and Business". The designation of school enabled the School to hire its own full-time faculty members, develop its own research and academic programming.

=== Christie MicroTiles wall ===
Located in the centre of the University of Waterloo Stratford School of Interaction Design and Business is its 3-story tall Christie MicroTiles wall, composed of 150 individual MicroTiles. The wall is used to showcase student content, highlight creative accomplishments and provide an open source canvas for digital media research.

The University of Waterloo Stratford School's Christie MicroTile wall was the Gold Winner in the Education and Healthcare category of the 2013 Apex Awards.

=== Stratford Accelerator Centre ===
The Stratford Accelerator Centre was located at the University of Waterloo Stratford School. Founded in 2014, the Stratford Accelerator Centre focused on accelerating the growth and maturation of early-stage technology and digital media companies. In 2019, the Accelerator Centre consolidated its operations in Waterloo, closing the Stratford Accelerator Centre. The Accelerator Centre provides mentorship to undergraduate and graduate students.

== Administration ==
Jessica Thompson is the Director of the University of Waterloo Stratford School of Interaction Design and Business.

The University of Waterloo Stratford School operates under the same bicameral system as the University of Waterloo; a system that consists of a Board of Governors and a Senate, as legislated by the University of Waterloo Act, 1972. The School shares the same President and Chancellor as the University of Waterloo.

== Housing ==
First-year admitted students are guaranteed a space to live in residence in Waterloo. Upper-year students typically live off-campus in the Stratford community or in Waterloo.
