= Digital light processing =

Set of chipsets

Logo

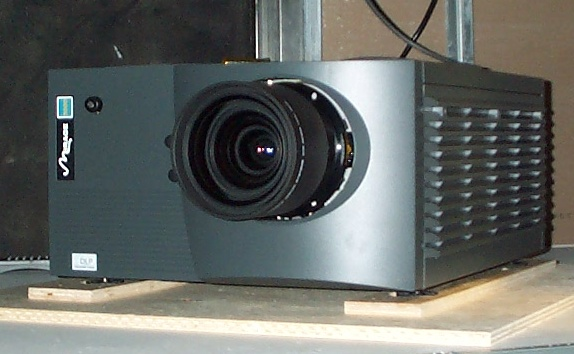
The Christie Mirage 5000, a 2001 DLP projector

Digital light processing (DLP) is a set of chipsets based on optical micro-electro-mechanical technology that uses a digital micromirror device. It was originally developed in 1987 by Larry Hornbeck of Texas Instruments. While the DLP imaging device was invented by Texas Instruments, the first DLP-based projector was introduced by Digital Projection Ltd in 1997. Digital Projection and Texas Instruments were both awarded Emmy Awards in 1998 for the DLP projector technology. Digital light processing (DLP) technology continues to be used in projection and other optical applications. DLP projectors are based on a semiconductor chip called a digital micromirror device (DMD) that contains an array of tiny mirrors that can be tilted one way or the other to control the direction of the reflected light. A one-chip system or a different red, green and blue optical path in a three-chip system can be used to create colour images.

DLP technology is used in DLP front projectors (standalone projection units for classrooms and business primarily), DLP rear projection television sets, and digital signs. It was also used in about 85% of digital cinema projection as of around 2011, and in additive manufacturing as a light source in some printers to cure resins into solid 3D objects.

DLP was used in a variety of display applications from traditional static displays to interactive displays and also non-traditional embedded applications including medical, security, and industrial uses. Smaller "pico" chipsets were used in mobile devices including cell phone accessories and projection display functions embedded directly into phones.

== Digital micromirror device ==
Diagram of a digital micromirror showing the mirror mounted on the suspended yoke with the torsion spring running bottom left to top right (light grey), with the electrostatic pads of the memory cells below (top left and bottom right)

In DLP projectors, the image is created by microscopically small mirrors laid out in a matrix on a semiconductor chip, known as a digital micromirror device (DMD). These mirrors are so small that DMD pixel pitch may be 5.4 μm or less. Each mirror represents one or more pixels in the projected image. The number of mirrors corresponds to the resolution of the projected image (often half as many mirrors as the advertised resolution due to wobulation). 800×600, 1024×768, 1280×720, and 1920×1080 (HDTV) matrices are some common DMD sizes. These mirrors can be repositioned rapidly to reflect light either through the lens or onto a heat sink (called a light dump in Barco terminology).

Rapidly toggling the mirror between these two orientations (essentially on and off) produces grayscales, controlled by the ratio of on-time to off-time.

== Color in DLP projection ==
There are two primary methods by which DLP projection systems create a color image: those used by single-chip DLP projectors, and those used by three-chip projectors. A third method, sequential illumination by three colored light-emitting diodes, is being developed, and is currently used in televisions manufactured by Samsung.

=== Single-chip projectors ===
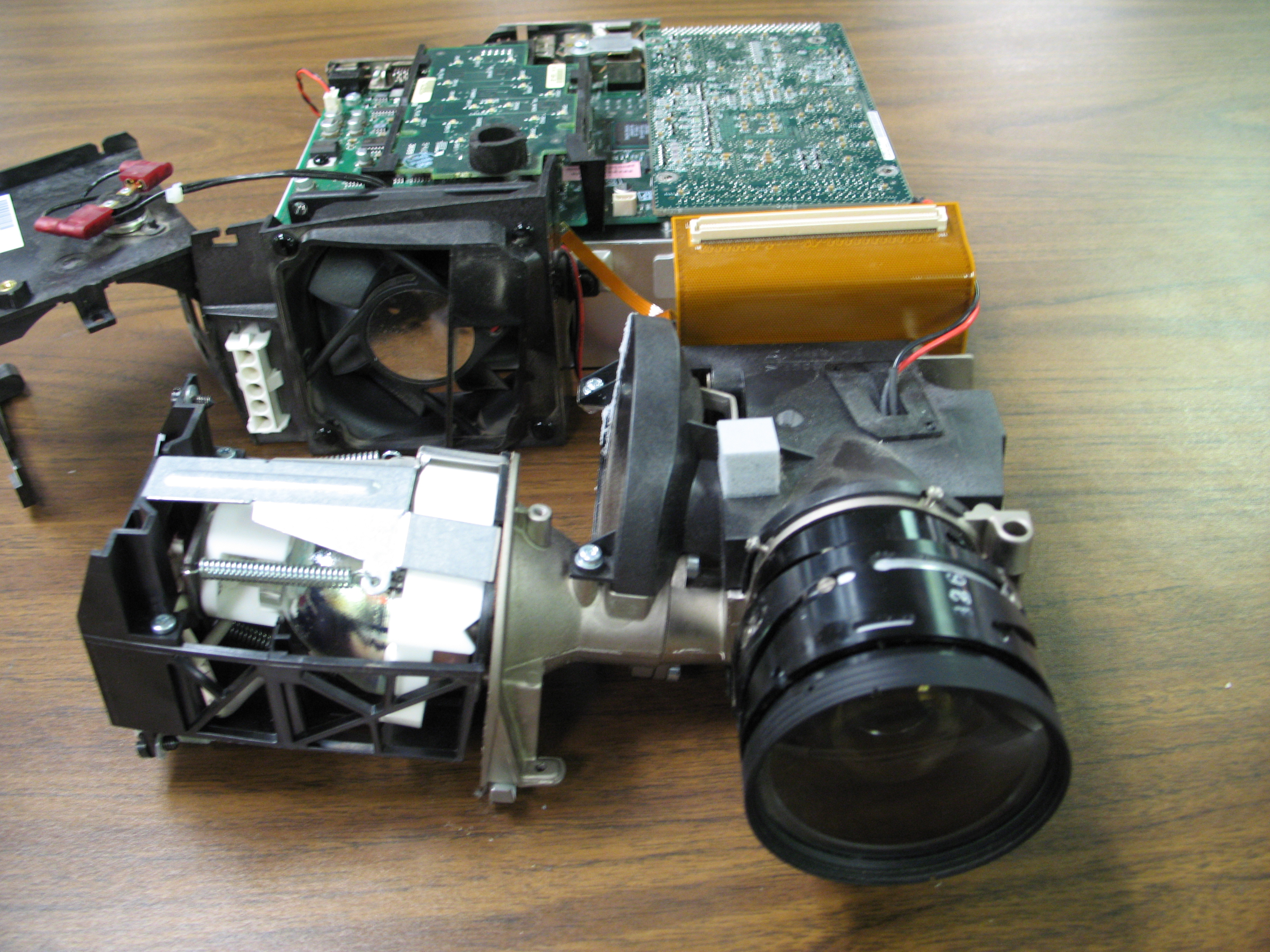

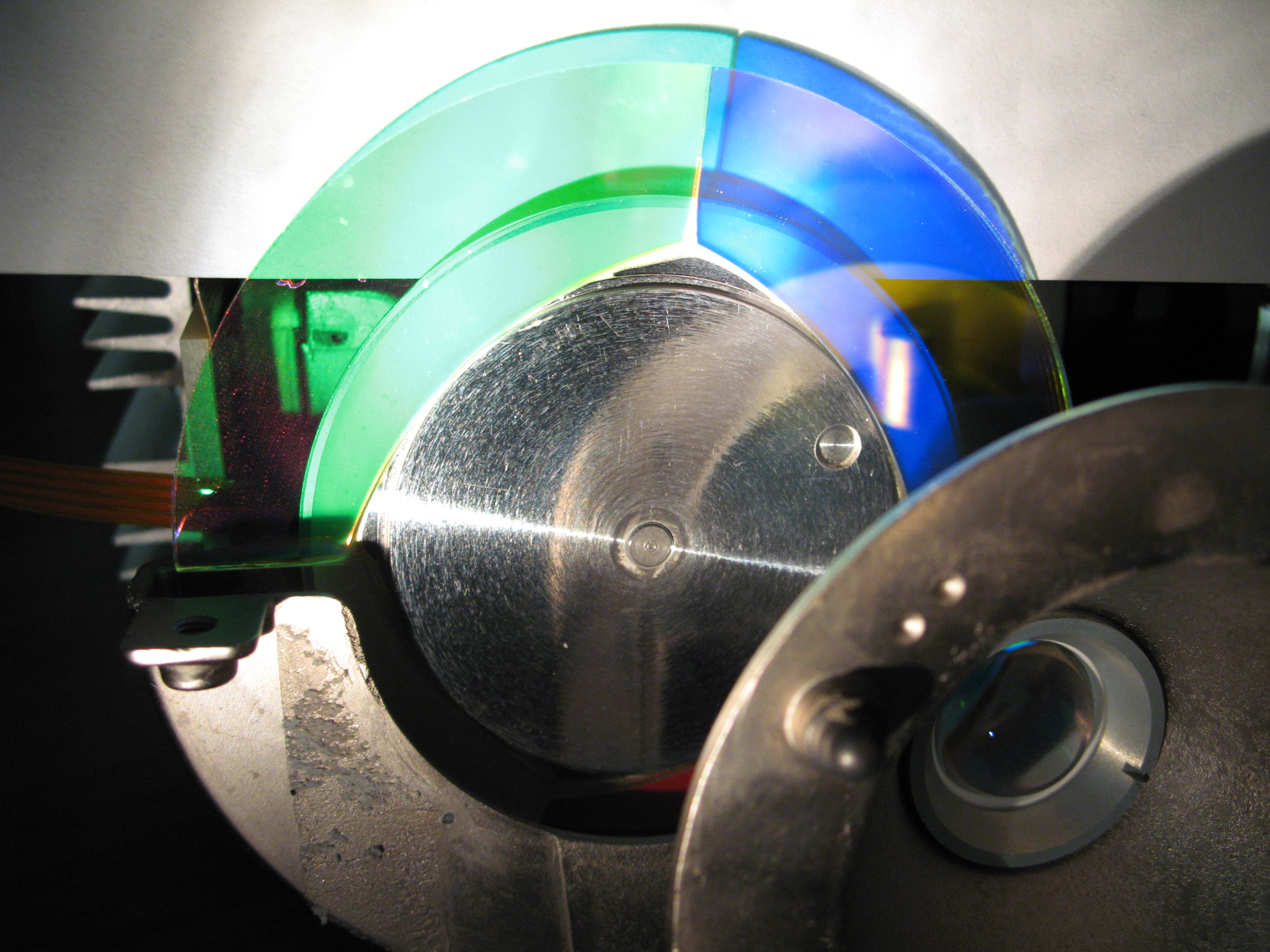

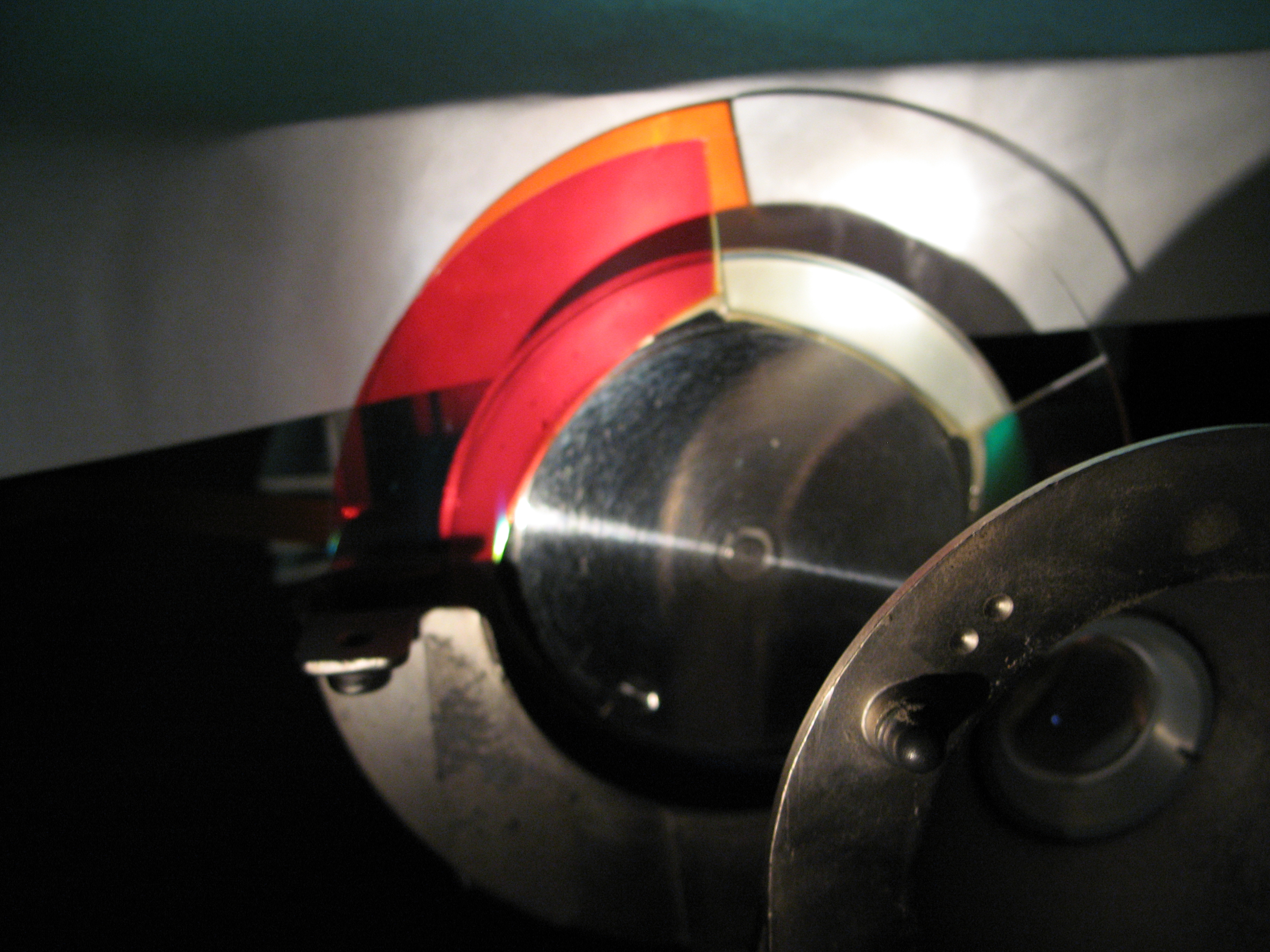

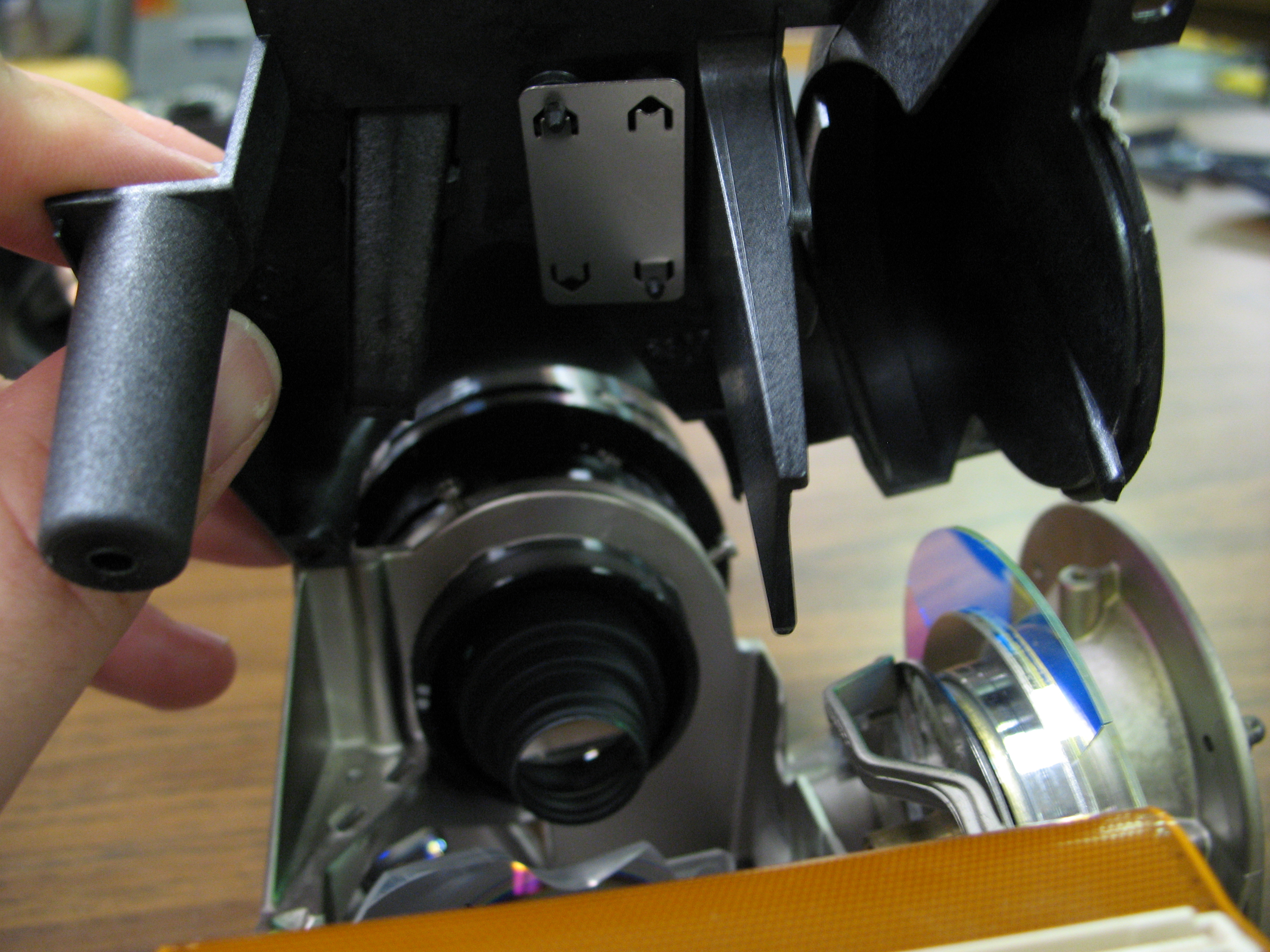

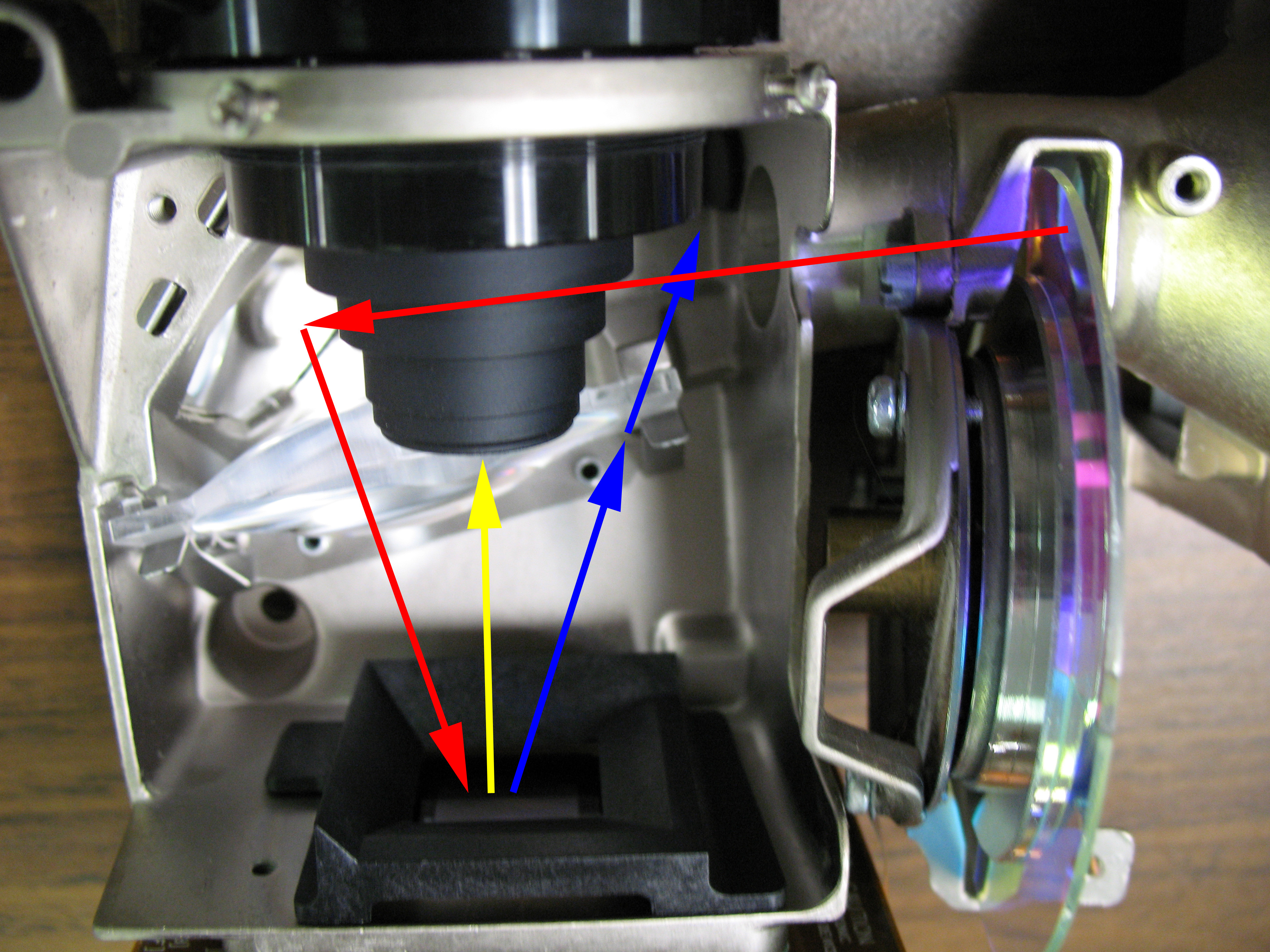
Interior view of a single-chip DLP projector, showing the light path. Light from the lamp enters a reverse-fisheye, passes through the spinning color wheel, crosses underneath the main lens, reflects off a front-surfaced mirror, and is spread onto the DMD (red arrows). From there, light either enters the lens (yellow) or is reflected off the top cover down into a light-sink (blue arrows) to absorb unneeded light. Top row shows overall components, closeups of 4-segment RGBW color wheel, and light-sink diffuser/reflection plate on top cover.

In a projector with a single DLP chip, colors are produced either by placing a color wheel between a white lamp and the DLP chip or by using individual light sources to produce the primary colors, LEDs or lasers for example. The color wheel is divided into multiple sectors: the primary additive colors: red, green, and blue, and in many cases white (clear). Newer systems substitute the primary subtractive colors cyan, magenta, and yellow for white. The use of the subtractive colors is part of the newer color performance system called BrilliantColor which processes the additive colors along with the subtractive colors to create a broader spectrum of possible color combinations on the screen.

The DLP chip is synchronized with the rotating motion of the color wheel so that the green component is displayed on the DMD when the green section of the color wheel is in front of the lamp. The same is true for the red, blue and other sections. The colors are thus displayed sequentially at a sufficiently high rate that the observer sees a composite "full color" image. In early models, this was one rotation per frame. Now, most systems operate at up to 10× the frame rate.

The black level of a single-chip DLP depends on how unused light is being disposed of. If the unused light is scattered to reflect and dissipate on the rough interior walls of the DMD and lens chamber, this scattered light will be visible as a dim gray on the projection screen, when the image is fully dark. Deeper blacks and higher contrast ratios are possible by directing unused HID light away from the DMD and lens chamber into a separate area for dissipation and shielding the light path from unwanted internal secondary reflections.

==== Color wheel "rainbow effect" ====
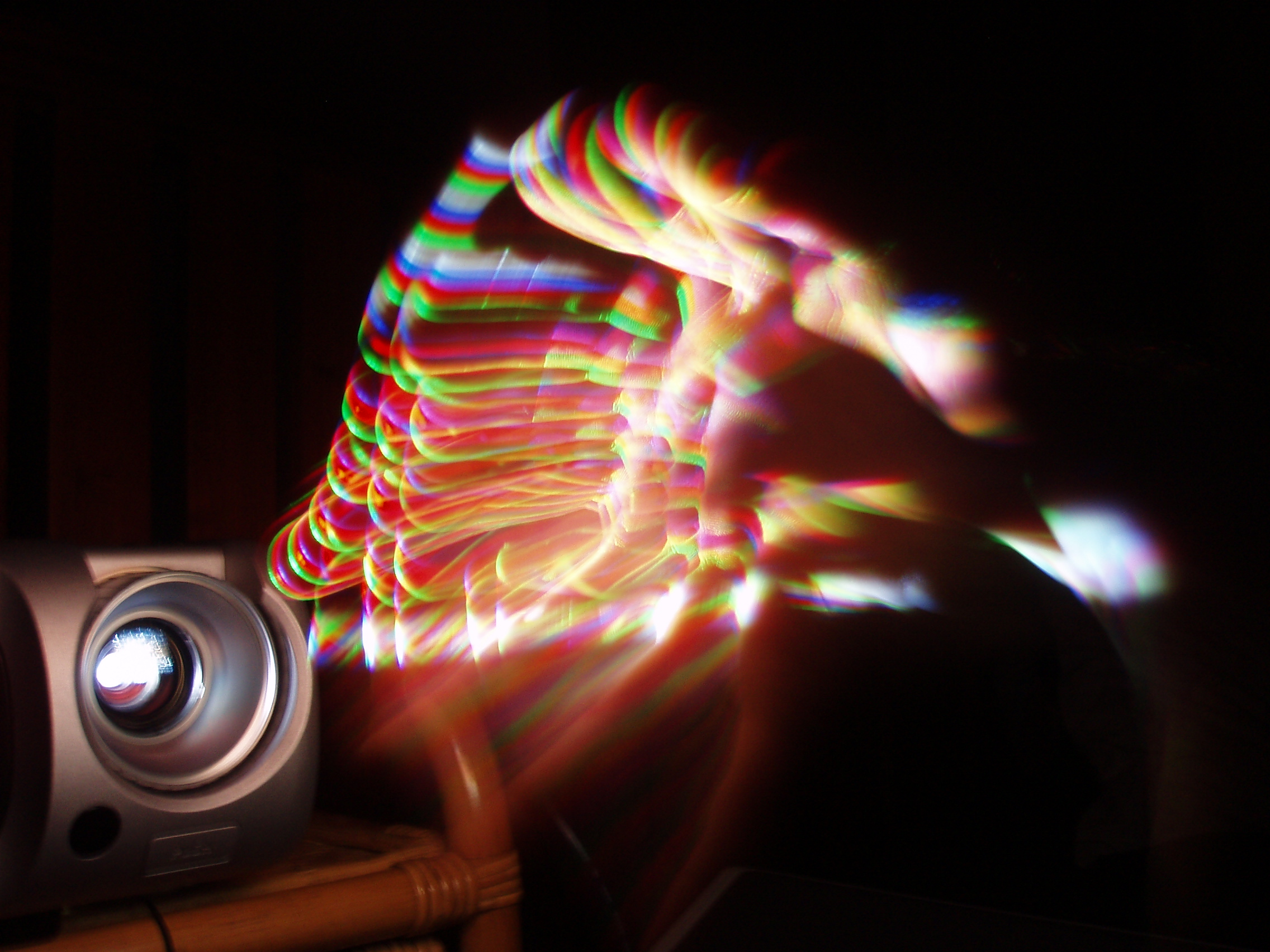
The rainbow effect found in 1DLP projectors only utilizing a mechanical spinning wheel

Single-chip DLP projectors utilizing a mechanical spinning color wheel may exhibit an anomaly known as the "rainbow effect". This is best described as brief flashes of perceived red, blue, and green "shadows" observed most often when the projected content features high contrast areas of moving bright or white objects on a mostly dark or black background. Common examples are the scrolling end credits of many movies, and also animations with moving objects surrounded by a thick black outline. Brief visible separation of the colors can also be apparent when the viewer's gaze is moved quickly across the projected image. Some people perceive these rainbow artifacts frequently, while others may never see them at all.

This effect is caused by the way the eye follows a moving object on the projection. When an object on the screen moves, the eye follows the object with a constant motion, but the projector displays each alternating color of the frame at the same location for the duration of the whole frame. So, while the eye is moving, it sees a frame of a specific color (red, for example). Then, when the next color is displayed (green, for example), although it gets displayed at the same location overlapping the previous color, the eye has moved toward the object's next frame target. Thus, the eye sees that specific frame color slightly shifted. Then, the third color gets displayed (blue, for example), and the eye sees that frame's color slightly shifted again. This effect is not perceived only for the moving object, but the whole picture. Multi-color LED-based and laser-based single-chip projectors are able to eliminate the spinning wheel and minimize the rainbow effect since the pulse rates of LEDs and lasers are not limited by physical motion. Three-chip DLP projectors function without color wheels, and therefore do not manifest this rainbow artifact."

=== Three-chip projectors ===
A three-chip DLP projector uses a prism to split light from the lamp, and each primary color of light is then routed to its own DMD chip, then recombined and routed out through the lens. Three-chip systems are found in higher-end home theater projectors, large venue projectors, and DLP Cinema projection systems found in digital movie theaters.

According to DLP.com, the three-chip projectors used in movie theaters can produce 35 trillion colors. The human eye is suggested to be able to detect around 16 million colors, which is theoretically possible with the single chip solution. However, this high color precision does not mean that three-chip DLP projectors are capable of displaying the entire gamut of colors we can distinguish (this is fundamentally impossible with any system composing colors by adding three constant base colors). In comparison, it is the one-chip DLP projectors that have the advantage of allowing any number of primary colors in a sufficiently fast color filter wheel, and so the possibility of improved color gamuts is available.

=== Light-source ===
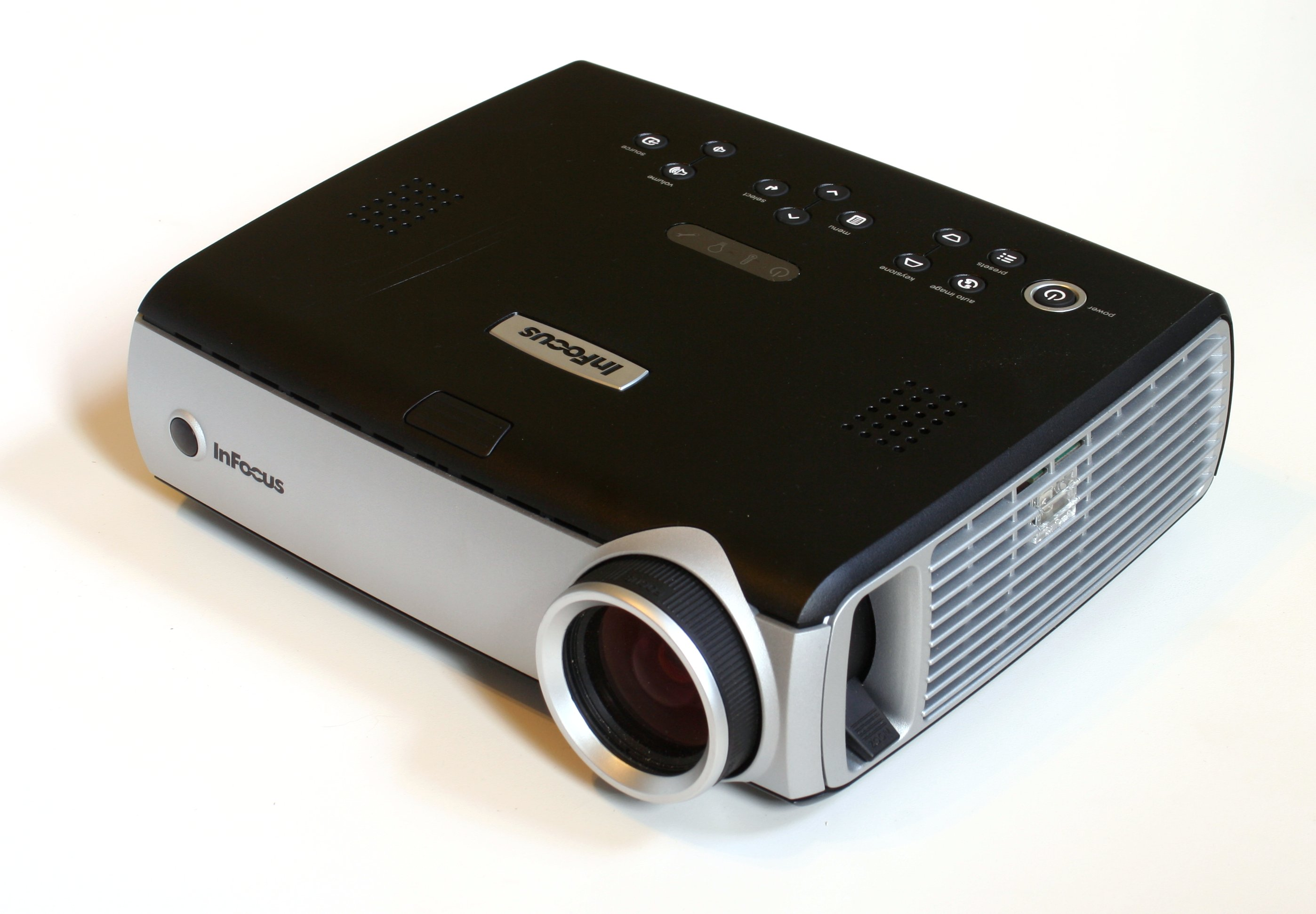
The InFocus IN34, a DLP projector

DLP technology is independent of the light-source and as such can be used effectively with a variety of light sources. Historically, the main light source used on DLP display systems has been a replaceable high-pressure xenon arc lamp unit (containing a quartz arc tube, reflector, electrical connections, and sometimes a quartz/glass shield), whereas most pico category (ultra-small) DLP projectors use high-power LEDs or lasers as a source of illumination. Since 2021 a laser light source has become very common on many professional projectors, for example the Panasonic PT-RZ990.

==== Xenon arc lamps ====
For xenon arc lamps, a constant-current supply is used, which starts with a sufficiently high open-circuit voltage (between 5 and 20 kV, depending on lamp) to cause an arc to strike between the electrodes, and once the arc is established, the voltage across the lamp drops to a given value (typically 20 to 50 volts) while the current increases to a level required to maintain the arc at optimal brightness. As the lamp ages, its efficiency declines, due to electrode wear, resulting in a reduction in visible light and an increase in the amount of waste heat. The lamp's end of life is typically indicated by an LED on the unit or an onscreen text warning, necessitating replacement of the lamp unit.

Continued operation of the lamp past its rated lifespan may result in a further decrease in efficiency, the lightcast may become uneven, and the lamp may eventually become hot enough to the point that the power wires can melt off the lamp terminals. Eventually, the required start-up voltage will also rise to the point where ignition can no longer occur. Secondary protections such as a temperature monitor may shut down the projector, but a thermally overstressed quartz arc tube can also crack or explode. Practically all lamp housings contain heat-resistant barriers (in addition to those on the lamp unit itself) to prevent the red-hot quartz fragments from leaving the area.

==== LED-based DLPs ====
The first commercially available LED-based DLP HDTV was the Samsung HL-S5679W in 2006, which also eliminated the use of a color wheel. Besides long lifetime eliminating the need for lamp replacement and elimination of the color wheel, other advantages of LED illumination include instant-on operation and improved color, with increased color saturation and improved color gamut to over 140% of the NTSC color gamut. Samsung expanded the LED model line-up in 2007 with products available in 50-, 56- and 61-inch screen sizes. In 2008, the third generation of Samsung LED DLP products were available in 61- (HL61A750) and 67-inch (HL67A750) screen sizes.

Ordinary LED technology does not produce the intensity and high-lumen output characteristics required to replace arc lamps. The special LEDs used in all of the Samsung DLP TVs are PhlatLight LEDs, designed and manufactured by US-based Luminus Devices. A single RGB PhlatLight LED chipset illuminates these projection TVs. The PhlatLight LEDs are also used in a new class of ultra-compact DLP front projector commonly referred to as a "pocket projector" and have been introduced in new models from LG Electronics (HS101), Samsung (SP-P400) and Casio (XJ-A series). Home theater projectors will be the next category of DLP projectors that will use PhlatLight LED technology. At InfoComm in June 2008, Luminus and TI announced their collaboration on using their technology on home theater and business projectors and demonstrated a prototype PhlatLight LED-based DLP home theater front projector. They also announced products will be available in the marketplace later in 2008 from Optoma and other companies to be named later in the year.

Luminus Devices PhlatLight LEDs were also used by Christie Digital in their DLP-based MicroTiles display system. It is a modular system built from small (20 inch diagonal) rear projection cubes, which can be stacked and tiled together to form large display canvasses with very small seams. The scale and shape of the display can have any size, only constrained by practical limits.

==== Laser-based DLPs ====
The first commercially available laser-based DLP HDTV was the Mitsubishi L65-A90 LaserVue in 2008, which also eliminated the use of a color wheel. Three separate color lasers illuminate the digital micromirror device (DMD) in these projection TVs, producing a richer, more vibrant color palette than other methods. See the laser video display article for more information.

== Digital cinema ==
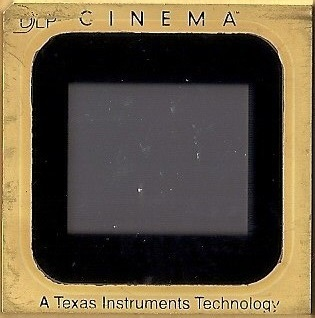
A DLP Cinema chip, manufactured by Texas Instruments

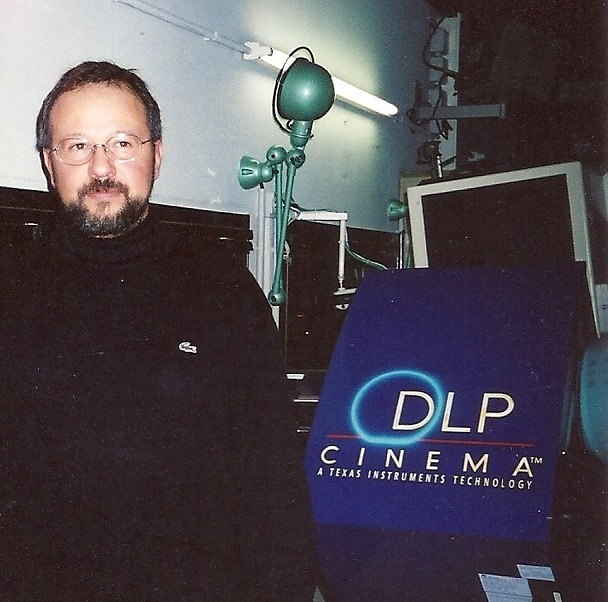
Texas Instruments, DLP Cinema prototype projector, Mark V, 2000

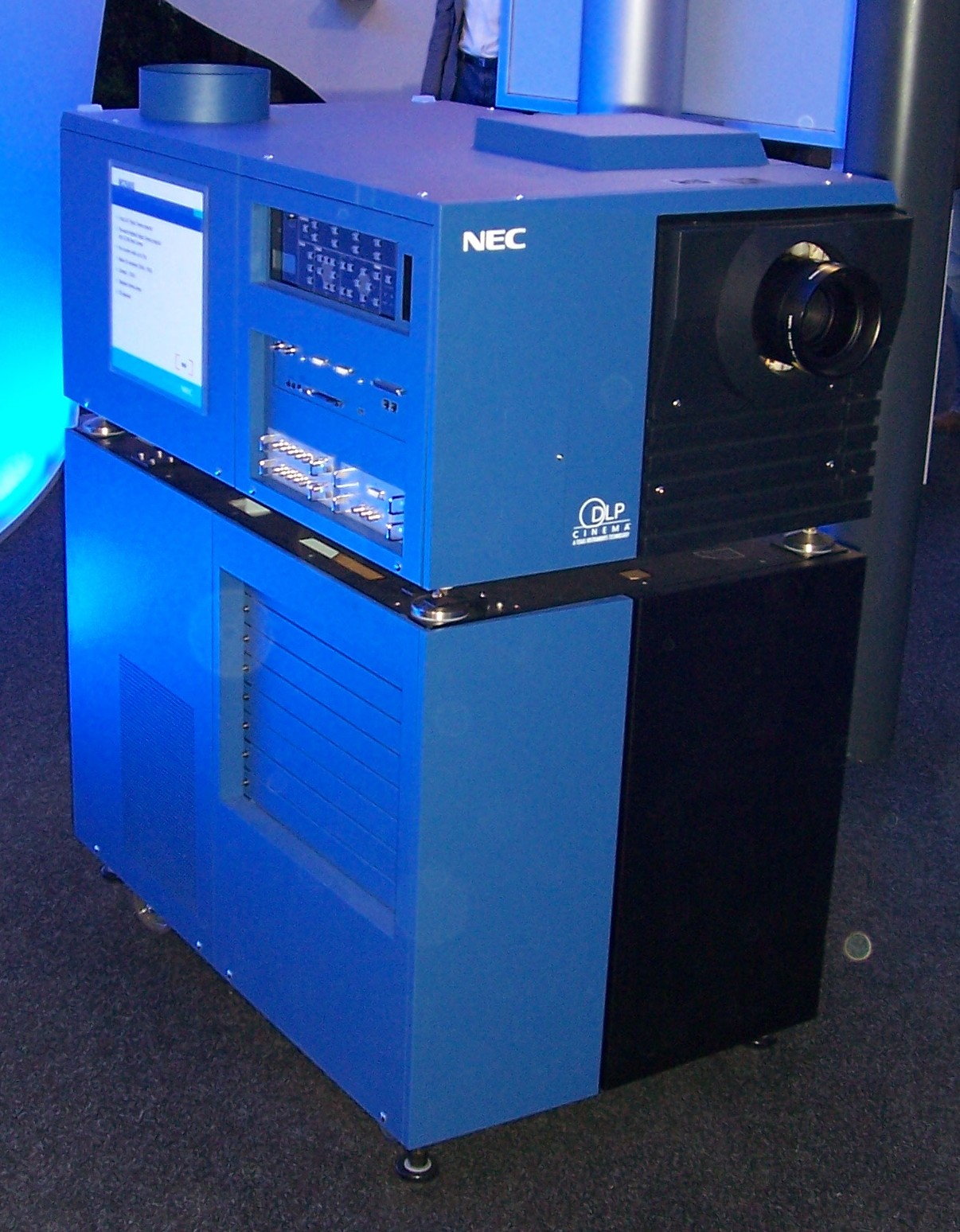
The NEC Cinema DLP projector in 2006

DLP Cinema systems have been deployed and tested commercially in theaters since 1999. In June 1999, Star Wars: Episode I – The Phantom Menace was the first movie to be entirely scanned and distributed to theaters. Four theaters installed digital projectors for the movie's release. The same was done for the animated film Tarzan that same year. Later that year, Toy Story 2 was the first movie to be entirely created, edited, and distributed digitally, with more theaters installing digital projectors for its release. DLP Cinema was the first commercial digital cinema technology and is the leading digital cinema technology with approximately 85% market share worldwide as of December 2011. Digital cinema has some advantages over film because film can be subject to color fading, jumping, scratching and dirt accumulation. Digital cinema allows the movie content to remain of consistent quality over time. Today, most movie content is also captured digitally. The first all-digital live-action feature shot without film was the 2002 release, Star Wars: Episode II – Attack of the Clones.

DLP Cinema does not manufacture the end projectors, but rather provides the projection technology and works closely with Barco, Christie Digital and NEC who make the end projection units. DLP Cinema is available to theater owners in multiple resolutions depending on the needs of the exhibitor. These include 2K – for most theater screens, 4K – for large theater screens, and S2K, which was specifically designed for small theaters, particularly in emerging markets worldwide.

On February 2, 2000, Philippe Binant, technical manager of Digital Cinema Project at Gaumont, in France, realized the first digital cinema projection in Europe with the DLP Cinema technology developed by Texas Instruments. DLP is the current market-share leader in professional digital movie projection, largely because of its high contrast ratio and available resolution as compared to other digital front-projection technologies. As of December 2008, there are over 6,000 DLP-based digital cinema systems installed worldwide.

DLP projectors are also used in RealD 3D and newer IMAX theaters for 3D films.

== Manufacturers and marketplace ==
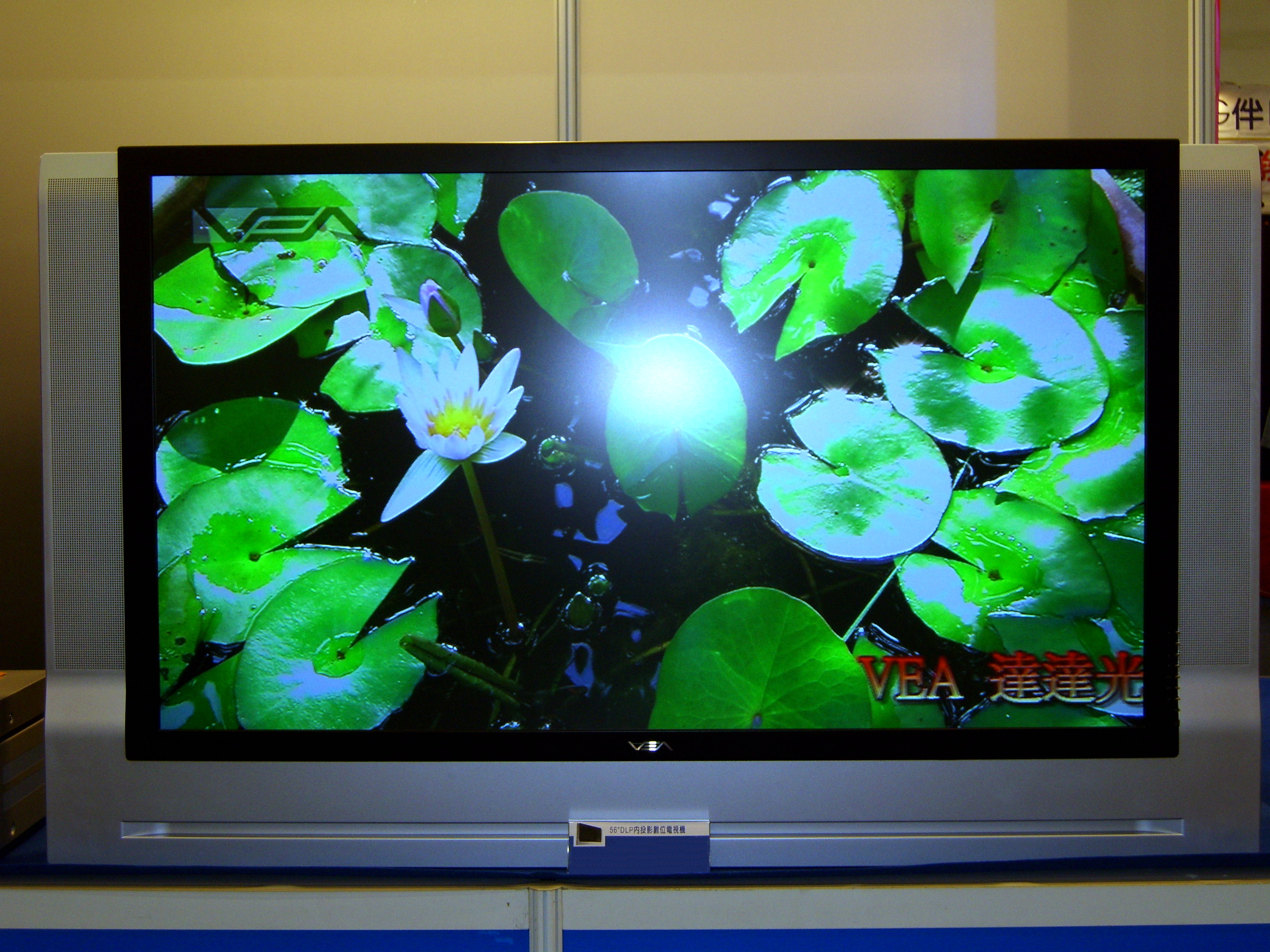
56-inch DLP rear-projection TV

Since being introduced commercially in 1996, DLP technology gained market share in the front projection market and now holds greater than 50% of the worldwide share in front projection in addition to 85% market share in digital cinema worldwide. Additionally, in the pico category (small, mobile display) DLP technology used to hold approximately 70% market share. Over 30 manufacturers used the DLP chipset to power their projection display systems.

=== Pros ===
- Smooth (at 1080p resolution), jitter-free images.
- Perfect geometry and excellent grayscale linearity are achievable.
- Usually excellent ANSI contrast.
- The use of a replaceable light source means a potentially longer life than CRTs and plasma displays (this may also be a con as listed below).
- The light source is more-easily replaceable than the backlights used with LCDs, and on DLPs is often user-replaceable.
- The light from the projected image is not inherently polarized.
- New LED and laser DLP display systems more or less eliminate the need for lamp replacement.
- DLP offers an affordable 3D projection display from a single unit and can be used with both active and passive 3D solutions.
- Lighter weight than contemporary LCD and plasma televisions.
- Unlike their LCD and plasma counterparts, DLP screens do not rely on fluids as their projection medium and are therefore not limited in size by their inherent mirror mechanisms, making them ideal for increasingly larger high-definition theater and venue screens.
- DLP projectors can process up to seven separate colors, giving them a wider color gamut.

=== Cons ===
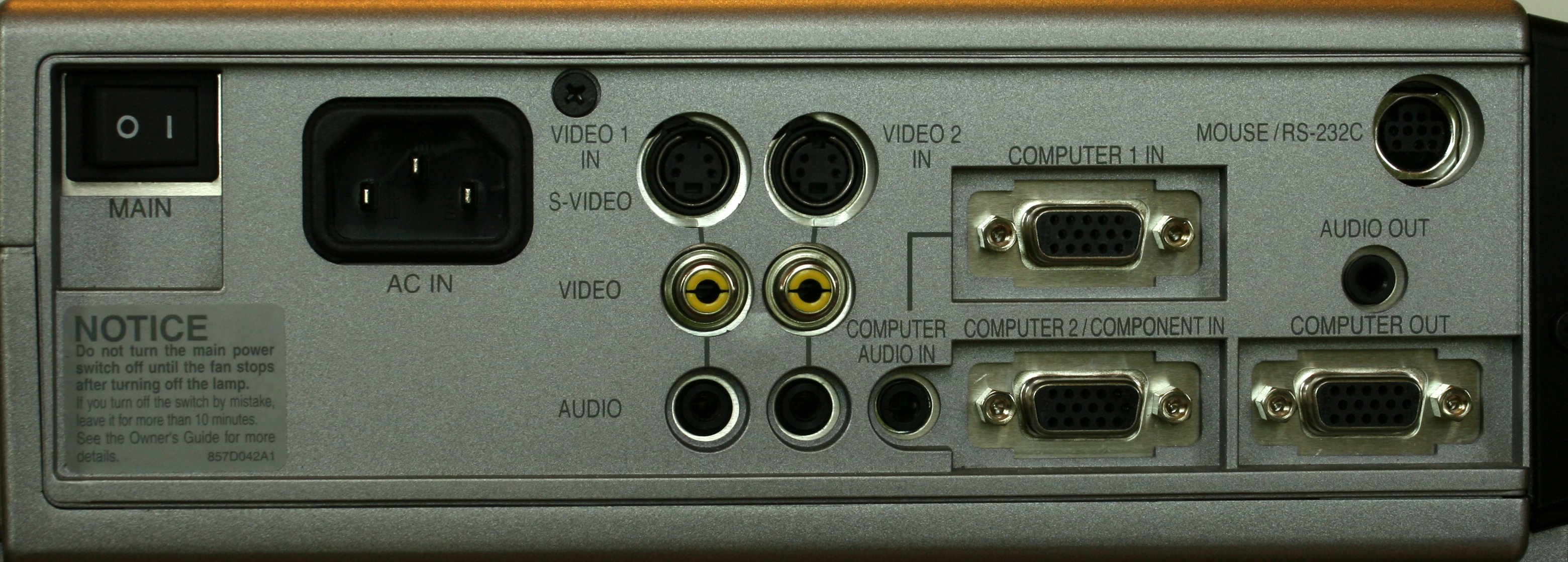
The rear panel of a Mitsubishi XD300U shows the output and input jacks which are available.

- Some viewers are troubled by the "rainbow effect" present in color-wheel models - particularly in older models (explained above). This can be observed easily by using a camera's digital viewfinder on projected content.
- Rear projection DLP TVs are not as thin as LCD or plasma flat-panel displays (although approximately comparable in weight), although some models as of 2008 are becoming wall-mountable (while still being 10 to 14 in [250 to 360 mm] thick)
- Replacement of the lamp in lamp-based units. The life span of an arc lamp averages 2000–5000 hours and the replacement cost for these range from $99 – 350, depending on the brand and model. Newer generations' units use LEDs or lasers which effectively eliminate this issue, although replacement LED chips could potentially be required over the extended lifespan of the television set.
- Some viewers find the high-pitched whine of the color wheel to be an annoyance. However, the drive system can be engineered to be silent and some projectors don't produce any audible color wheel noise.
- Dithering noise may be noticeable, especially in dark image areas. Newer (post-2004) chip generations have less noise than older ones.
- Error-diffusion artifacts caused by averaging a shade over different pixels, since one pixel cannot render the shade exactly
- Response time in video games may be affected by upscaling lag. While all HDTVs have some lag when upscaling lower-resolution input to their native resolution, DLPs are commonly reported to have longer delays. Newer consoles that have HD output signals do not have this problem as long as they are connected with HD-capable cables.
- Reduced viewing angle as compared to direct-view technologies such as CRT, plasma, and LCD
- May use more electricity, and generate more heat, than competing technologies.
- Modern (RGB LED/Laser) DLP based systems no longer physically possess the advertised (native) number of pixels and only a quarter (25%) is present (eg a 960x540 DMD is used in a 1920x1080 FullHD projector). Such systems rely on a temporal shifting by a vibrating glass plate to sequence 4 sub-pictures using a SLM - spatial light modulator). Same applies for most 4K projectors - only a FHD DMD chip is installed along with a SLM. The SLM/glass element used to shift the image by half the pixel does significantly reduce image contrast, increases black levels, appears as migrating noise and is incapable of reproducing pixel-perfect UI graphics correctly. The faster switching of colors using RGB LEDs made this cheat possible.

=== DLP, LCD, and LCoS rear projection ===
The most similar competing system to DLP is known as LCoS (liquid crystal on silicon), which creates images using a stationary mirror mounted on the surface of a chip and uses a liquid crystal matrix (similar to a liquid crystal display) to control how much light is reflected. DLP-based television systems are also arguably considered to be smaller in depth than traditional projection television.

== See also ==
- 3LCD
- Comparison of display technology
- Handheld projector
- Inflatable movie screen
- Large-screen television technology
- Laser video display
- Liquid crystal on silicon
- Organic light-emitting diode (OLED)
- Surface-conduction electron-emitter display (SED)
