= NASCAR Hall of Fame =

Museum in Charlotte, North Carolina, United States

Coordinates: 35.221599°N 80.843277°W

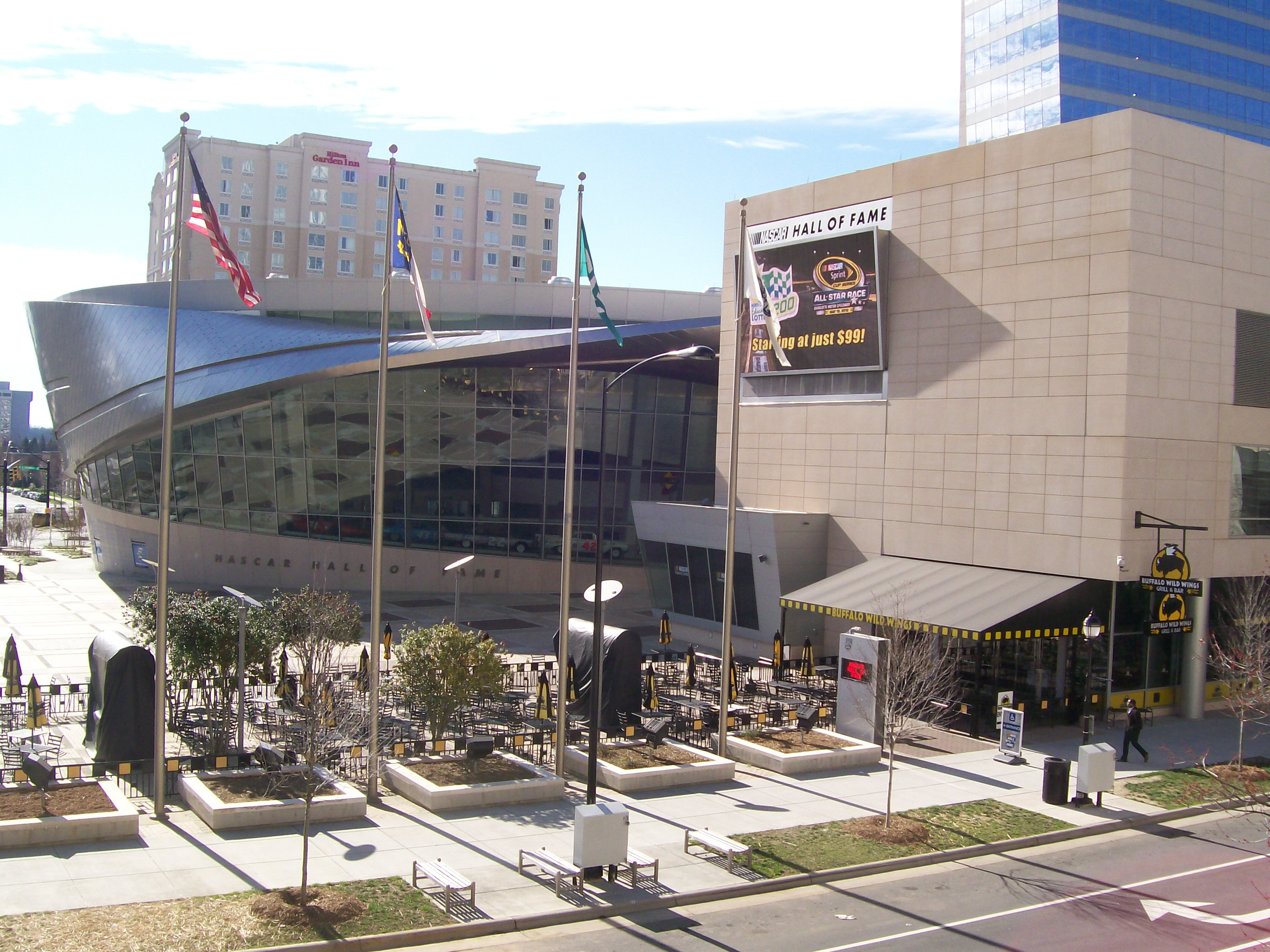
- NASCAR Hall of Fame entrance
- Interactive map of NASCAR Hall of Fame
- Location: 400 E. Martin Luther King Jr. Blvd; Charlotte, North Carolina
- Owner: City of Charlotte
- Operator: Charlotte Regional Visitors Authority
- Public transit: 3rd Street/CC

Construction
- Groundbreaking: January 2007
- Opened: May 11, 2010
- Cost: US $160 million
- Architect: Pei Cobb Freed & Partners

Website
- nascarhall.com

The NASCAR Hall of Fame is the hall of fame for the motorsports organization of NASCAR located in Charlotte, North Carolina. Opened on May 11, 2010, the Hall of Fame enshrines all-time figures in the history of the organization, including drivers, crew-chiefs, owners, broadcasters and front-office personnel within the sanctioning body.

As of 2026, there are a total of 70 members of the Hall of Fame. Three new inductees are normally enshrined every year, starting with the 2021 Class.

== History and construction ==
NASCAR committed to building a Hall of Fame and on March 6, 2006, the City of Charlotte was selected as the location. Ground was broken for the $160 million facility on January 26, 2007, and it officially opened on May 11, 2010, with the inaugural class inducted the day following the 2010 NASCAR Sprint All-Star Race. In addition to the Hall of Fame, the NASCAR Plaza, a 20-story office building, opened in May 2009. The 390,000-square-foot (36,000 m^{2}) structure serves as the home of Hall of Fame-related offices, NASCAR Digital Media, NASCAR's licensing division, as well as NASCAR video game licensee Dusenberry Martin Racing (now known as 704Games). Other tenants include the Charlotte Regional Partnership and Lauth Property Group. Richard Petty and Dale Inman helped unveil the first artifact at the Hall of Fame—the Plymouth Belvedere that Petty drove to 27 wins in 1967.

The City of Charlotte was responsible for the construction of the building and is the owner of the NASCAR Hall of Fame. However, it is operated by the Charlotte Regional Visitors Authority. Winston Kelley is the NASCAR Hall of Fame executive director. Internationally renowned Pei Cobb Freed & Partners led the design effort, and Leslie E. Robertson Associates were the structural engineers. Little Diversified Architectural Consulting based in Charlotte is the local architectural firm overseeing many aspects of design and construction of the project. LS3P Associates, Ltd. was the associate architect for the office tower. Tobin Starr + Partners served as site architect, providing full-time representation for Pei Cobb Freed & Partners during construction. Engineering and fabrication of the stainless steel Möbius strip that wraps around the structure was completed by Zahner, of Kansas City. Exhibition design is by Ralph Appelbaum Associates, and exhibition lighting by Technical Artistry. Tobin Starr + Partners is architect-of-record for exhibit and auditorium spaces. A display of Christie MicroTiles™ digital display tiles run archival videos and engaging visitors in the Great Hall.

Jaros, Baum & Bolles (JB&B) was the mechanical, electrical and plumbing engineer. Site excavation and grading services started on May 21, 2007. The facility features a Hall of Fame and a 19-story office tower. The NASCAR Hall of Fame is set on a 150,000 square feet surface. The museum opened on May 11, 2010. In 2009, NASCAR Hall of Fame established a partnership with Buffalo Wild Wings to be its exclusive restaurant partner in Charlotte.

== Site selection ==
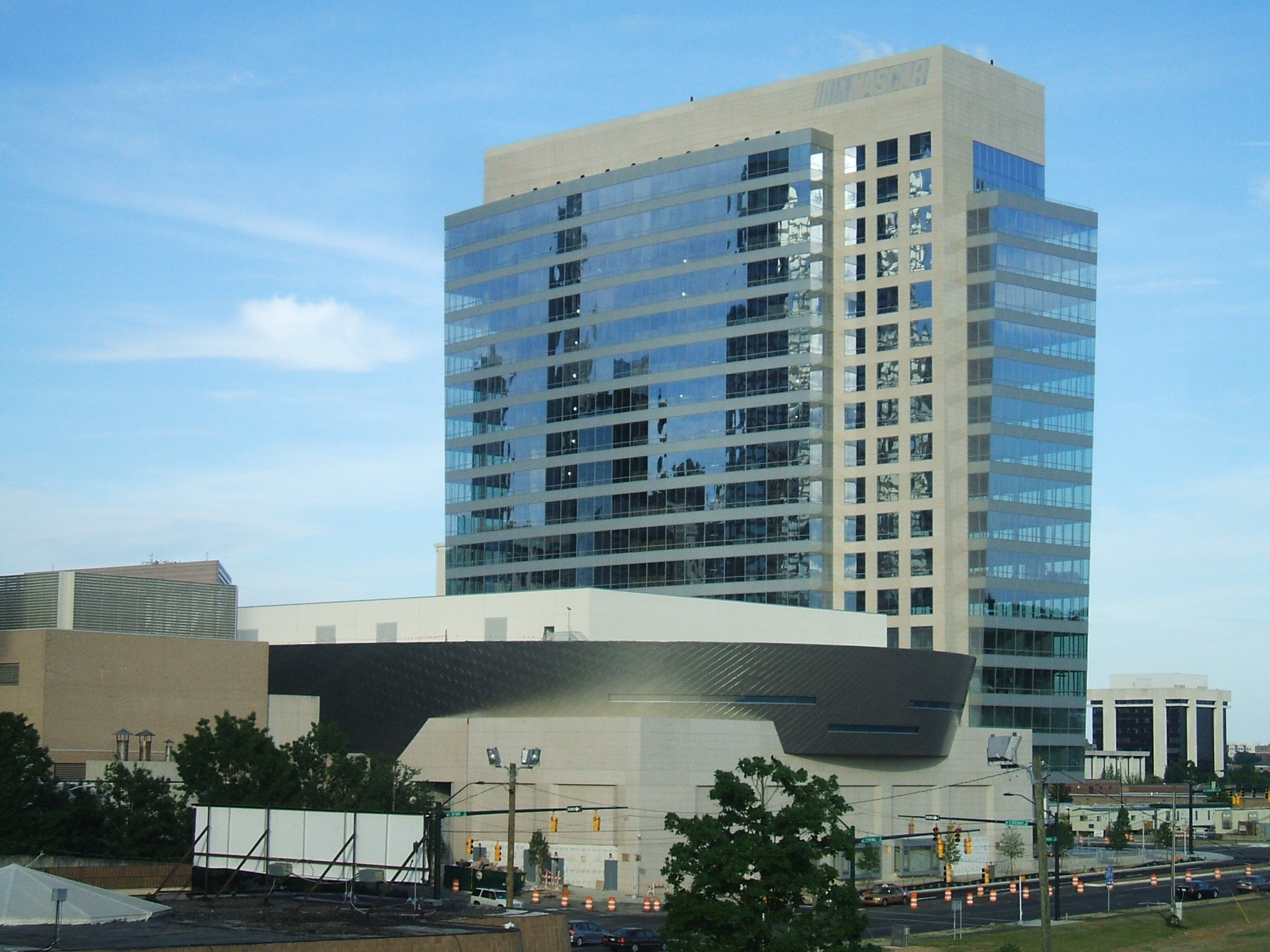
Photo taken from the CATS Stonewall Station (May 2009)

Because of stock car racing's roots in and wealth of famous drivers from North Carolina, Charlotte was considered the favorite by many fans and commentators. There are many NASCAR offices in the area and many teams in the three major NASCAR series (Cup, Xfinity and Truck Series) totaling over 73% of motorsports employees in the United States, in what the committee called "NASCAR Valley." The Hall of Fame is in Uptown Charlotte, about 25 minutes south of Charlotte Motor Speedway. The bid was led by NASCAR car owner Rick Hendrick, then Mayor Pat McCrory, and business leaders in Charlotte. Pei Cobb Freed & Partners were enlisted to design the complex, which is near the Charlotte Convention Center.

=== Hall of Fame building ===
The building contains the following:

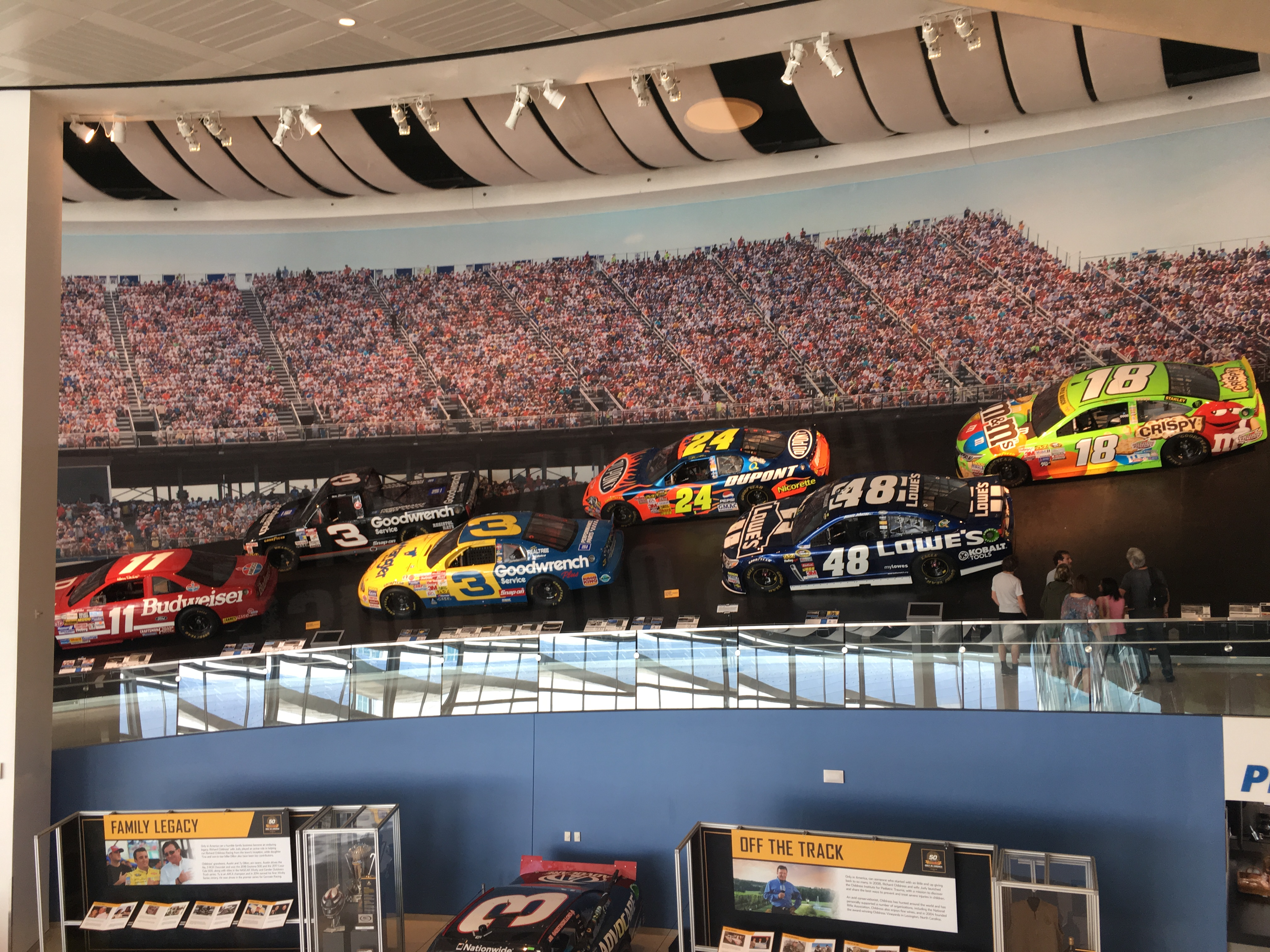
Glory Road

- First Floor:
  - High Octane Theater – A screening room below ground level which shows videos to guests, including a primer video for first-time visitors.
- Second Floor:
  - Ceremonial Plaza – An outdoor "patio" with a video screen.
  - Glory Road – A 33-degree banked ramp (matching that of Talladega Superspeedway) featuring 18 different cars and saluting 46 past and current tracks.
  - The Great Hall – Dubbed as the Times Square of the hall, a 14 feet (4.3 m)-by-18 feet (5.5 m) video screen and rotating exhibits will be staged here.
  - "Studio 43" – Named in honor of Richard Petty's car number – used for television production.
- Third Floor:
  - Hall of Honor – A 360-degree wall with the honorees enshrined serves as the centerpiece of the building with each enshrinee with their own exhibit.
  - Transporter and Racecar Simulators – Simulators provided by iRacing.com.
  - Inside NASCAR – Simulates an actual week in a NASCAR team, from race prep through inspection, practice, time trials and the race.
- Fourth Floor:
  - Heritage Speedway – The seven decade history of NASCAR is focused here, including a glass-enclosed section with historic artifacts from the history of stock car racing.

There is a gift shop, the Hall of Fame Café and a Buffalo Wild Wings restaurant on site. An expansion, which includes a new ballroom, is part of the project.

While most information on the Charlotte bid has been released voluntarily, the Charlotte Observer has asked the state Attorney General for an opinion requiring full disclosure of the financial details.

The self-proclaimed slogan used by Charlotte for the Hall of Fame was "Racing Was Built Here. Racing Belongs Here." The NASCAR Hall of Fame's current slogan is, "This is our sport. This is our house."

=== Other final candidates ===
The other two cities at the time of the announcement that were in the running were the cities of Atlanta and Daytona Beach.

==== Other bids ====
The state of Alabama had been mentioned as a potential candidate location, and was no longer seen as a contender, possibly because Lincoln, Alabama is home to the International Motorsports Hall of Fame, which is not affiliated with NASCAR. The only northern area that considered bidding was in the state of Michigan. Detroit prepared bids, but state officials decided not to submit the proposals. The cities of Richmond, Virginia and Kansas City, Kansas, were among the five finalists, but on January 5, 2006, NASCAR announced they had been eliminated from the running, leaving just Atlanta, Charlotte and Daytona Beach as the remaining cities.

== Eligibility and selection process ==
=== Eligibility ===
Former drivers must have been active in NASCAR for at least 10 years and retired for at least three. Starting with the 2015 Hall of Fame nominations that were voted in the 2014 nomination process, the three-year rule is waived for drivers who compete in 30 or more years in NASCAR-sanctioned competition or turn 55 years of age. The rule applies to all NASCAR-sanctioned competitions; some drivers in the Hall of Fame did not participate in the Cup Series.

Non-drivers must have been involved in the industry at least ten years. Some candidates with shorter careers will be considered if there were special circumstances.

=== Selection process ===
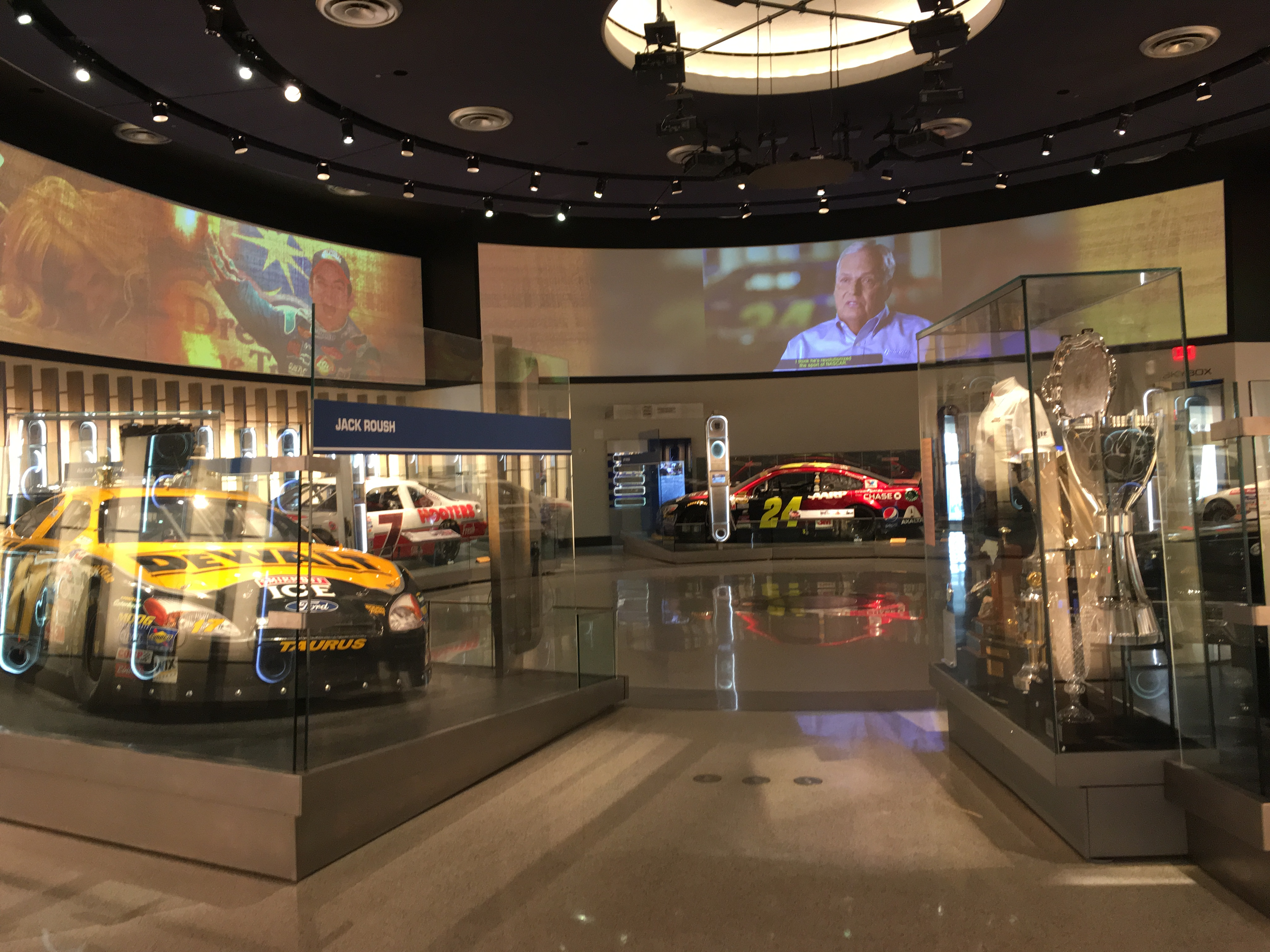
Hall of Honor, where the inductees are enshrined

==== Nomination ====
A nominating committee chooses nominees from those who are eligible. As of 2025, 15 nominees will be chosen for the Modern Era and five from the Pioneer Era.

The committee for the Modern Era Ballot consists of 22 members:

- Seven NASCAR representatives;
- NASCAR Hall of Fame Executive Director Winston Kelley;
- NASCAR Hall of Fame Historian;
- Select media members;
- Track owners (Two each from NASCAR-owned tracks and Speedway Motorsports Inc.), a representative of the other circuits -- Penske Corporation (Indianapolis Motor Speedway), Mattco (Pocono Raceway), Curtis Francois (Gateway Motorsports Park) and Circuit of the Americas;
- Four track owners from historic short tracks: Bowman Gray Stadium, Rockford Speedway, the Holland Motorsports Complex, and West Coast track operator Ken Clapp.

The committee for the Pioneer Era Ballot consists of 43 members:

- Modern Era committee;
- The Honors Committee which includes all living members of the Hall of Fame;

==== Induction ====
After the nomination committee selects the list of candidates, a total of 65 votes are cast by the members, including a fan vote. Two are selected for the Modern Era and one for the Pioneer Era.

== Inductees ==
As of the class of 2027, a total of 73 individuals have been inducted into the NASCAR Hall of Fame. 58 were inducted as drivers, 32 of whom were inducted solely as drivers. The other 26 were inducted for their accomplishments as drivers, owners, crew chiefs, and/or broadcasters. 22 were inducted for their roles as owners in the sport. 5 were inducted as promoters of the sport. 7 members were inducted as crew chiefs.

=== Nominees not yet inducted ===
# Nominations	Driver	Years nominated
11	Harry Hyde	2016–2027
9	Ray Fox	2013–2020, 2027
7	Neil Bonnett	2020–2027
6	Banjo Matthews	2021–2027
5	Tim Brewer	2023–2027
3	Sam Ard	2020, 2023–2024
3	Greg Biffle	2025–2027
3	Randy Dorton	2025–2027
3	Jack Sprague	2025–2027
2	Jake Elder	2021, 2026
2	A. J. Foyt	2023–2024
2	John Holman	2019–2020
2	Randy LaJoie	2026–2027
2	Bob Welborn	2025–2026
1	Ray Elder	2027
1	Herb Nab	2027
1	Marvin Panch	2020
1	Jim Paschal	2020
1	Red Vogt	2020

== See also ==
- International Drag Racing Hall of Fame
- International Motorsports Hall of Fame
- Motorsports Hall of Fame of America
