= Satellite campus =

Campus of a college or university physically at a distance from the main campus

A satellite campus, branch campus, or regional campus is a campus of a university or college that is physically at a distance from the institution's main campus area. This branch campus may be located in a different location, city, state, or country, and is often smaller than the primary campus of an institution. A satellite campus may or may not share the same accreditation, administrative structures, budgets, resources, and governance as the main campus.

== Online education ==
In many cases, satellite campuses are "commuter campuses" that are intended to serve students who cannot travel far from home for college because of family responsibilities, their jobs, financial limitations, or other factors. Often times, the students live at their family homes instead of near campus, commuting to college courses throughout the week. The availability of branch campuses may increase higher education enrollment by nontraditional students.

Electronic communications technology has helped to facilitate the operation of satellite campuses. Classes taught at one campus can be transmitted to other locations via distance education, students at branch campuses can access library materials on the main campus electronically, and technology allows institutions to administer registration, admissions, and financial aid transactions remotely.

== International campus ==
One growing trend is the establishment of international branch campuses. These are satellite campuses of a parent institution that is located outside the country where the satellite campus is located. The number of international branch campuses worldwide grew from 35 before 1999 to 162 in 2009, including 78 branches operated by United States universities. As of 2009, the United Arab Emirates was the host of 40 international branch campuses, more than any other nation. There were 15 international branch campuses in China, 12 in Singapore, nine in Qatar, and six in Canada. In addition to the United States, the home countries of institutions with international branches include Australia, whose universities operated a total of 14 international branches; the United Kingdom, with 13 international branches; and France and India, each of whose universities had a total of 11 international branches. Although the overall number of international branch campuses has grown rapidly, a total of 11 such campuses closed between 2004 and 2009. A new breed of branch campuses of Indian universities in the Persian Gulf region is emerging which aims to meet South Asians' aspirations to study abroad in a cost-efficient manner.

There are several regional satellite or branch campus consortia but only one national association in the United States. The National Association of Branch Campus Administrators, NABCA seeks to unify higher education officials, working to advance scholarship, provide research opportunities, and facilitate networking events, both online and at a national conference each year.

== Examples ==
- St. John's University, with its main campus in the New York City borough of Queens, has five satellite campuses. Two are located in New York City (Manhattan and Staten Island), one is in the outlying suburb of Hauppauge, New York, and two others are in Europe, specifically in Paris and Rome.
- Ohio State University, located in the state's capital of Columbus, has five satellite campuses around the state: Lima, Mansfield, Marion, Newark and the Agricultural Technical Institute in Wooster.
- Ohio University, with its main campus in the southeastern town of Athens, has eight satellite campuses and centers around the state: Cambridge, Chillicothe, Ironton (Southern Campus), Lancaster, Pickerington (Pickerington Center), Proctorville (Proctorville Center), St. Clairsville (Eastern Campus) and Zanesville.
- Gratz College has an all-girls undergraduate campus. It is located in Baltimore and offers many degree options as well as study abroad opportunities for undergraduate students.
- Arizona State University, whose main campus is in the Phoenix suburb of Tempe, has three satellite campuses in other parts of the Phoenix area: one located in Glendale called the Arizona State University at the West Campus; another located in downtown Phoenix called Arizona State University at the Downtown Phoenix campus; and its third located in Mesa called Arizona State University at the Polytechnic campus.
- Brigham Young University, located in Provo, Utah, has two satellite campuses: one in Laie, Hawaii and the other in Rexburg, Idaho.
- The University of Michigan has two satellite campuses: one located in Flint and the other in Dearborn.
- Drexel University has three branch campuses: Drexel University Sacramento in California, Drexel University at Burlington County College in South Jersey, and the LeBowe College of Business Malvern Campus in suburban Philadelphia.
- The Weill Cornell Medical College in Qatar and Weill Cornell Medical College of Cornell University at New York City are satellite campuses of Cornell University.
- The University of Waterloo maintains three satellite campuses in addition to its main campus in Waterloo, Ontario, Canada. The School of Architecture moved from the main campus to a satellite campus in Cambridge, Ontario in 2004 due to lack of space at the main campus and as an initiative to spur economic activity in Cambridge. The School of Pharmacy relocated to a satellite campus in downtown Kitchener, Ontario in 2008. The University of Waterloo Stratford Campus was established in 2009 for Faculty of Arts programs centred on digital media.
- University College London has established branch campuses in Adelaide, Australia and Doha, Qatar. These campuses are research intensive with all studies at graduate level only.
- Pennsylvania State University has 19 commonwealth campuses around the state, known as the Commonwealth Campuses, enrolling approximately 40 percent of the university's students.
- University of Pittsburgh has 4 regional campuses in western Pennsylvania. Campuses at Johnstown, Bradford, and Greensburg offer four-year programs, while the Titusville campus offers two-year programs.
- The Branch campuses of the University of Wisconsin System only offer two-year programs intended to allow students to transfer to the university's main campus or other four-year universities.
- In 2008, Michigan State University established a satellite campus in Dubai, offering undergraduate education in five majors plus one master's degree program. The Dubai campus was designed to have the same curriculum and standards for admissions and student work as the university's main campus in Michigan. The university announced in 2010 that it was terminating the undergraduate program in Dubai after just two years due to insufficient enrollment, but would continue to offer a master's degree program in human resources and labor relations in Dubai.
- The University of Connecticut operates a branch campus on the Connecticut coast in Groton that specializes in oceanography and marine sciences.
- The University of South Florida
- The University of Winchester in the UK has a satellite campus in the town of Basingstoke 20 miles to the north east of the main campus (Chute House Campus).
- Universities in Nigeria made extensive use of satellite campuses to accommodate growing demand for tertiary education in the latter decades of the 20th century. In 2001, the nation's National University Commission (NUC) directed that most satellite campuses be shut down. The NUC was concerned that the proliferation of satellite campuses was resulting in lower academic standards and was happening primarily for a profit motive and not to provide quality education. Under the new NUC rules, satellite campuses were allowed only within 200 km from the university's main campus and within the same state in which the main campus is located, and their staff were required to be "directly or indirectly appointed by main campus in line with laid down academic standards." In spite of these restrictions, as of 2009 Lagos State University enrolled more than 61,000 students at satellite campuses. The university, which was initially formed with a main campus in Ojo and additional campuses in Epe, Ikeja, and Surulere, also operated external campuses at Anthony Village, Badagry, Ikorodu, Lekki, Festac Town, Ikoyi, Isolo and Agege.
- The University of Nottingham includes 4 campuses and a teaching hospital within the UK, alongside international campuses in Malaysia and China.
- Cranfield University opened a Campus in Kitakyushu, Japan in April 2001.
- The University of Southampton opened a Campus in Johor, Malaysia in October 2012.
- Webster University, a private non-profit school in St. Louis, has more than 60 locations, including full residential campuses in Europe and a new campus in Accra, Ghana.
- Northumbria University has a satellite campus for the School of Design in London.
- The University of Castile-La Mancha has four main campuses: Albacete, Toledo, Ciudad Real (which includes the university administrative buildings) and Cuenca. There are also two branch campuses in Talavera (associated to Toledo) and Almadén (associated to Ciudad Real). There used to be a non-campus centre in Puertollano, also associated to Ciudad Real, but was closed in 2011.
- The Universidad Nacional de Educación a Distancia has its campus in the Ciudad Universitaria of Madrid, but keeps a two-level branch system of 'Centros Asociados' which in turn have their own 'Extensiones'.

Universities in Castile-La Mancha, showing branch campuses (all UNED centres are branches of the Madrid central campus).

- The Rochester Institute of Technology has four international satellite campuses, the RIT Croatia in Zagreb, Croatia and in Dubrovnik, Croatia, RIT Kosovo in Pristina, Kosovo, RIT Dubai in Dubai, United Arab Emirates, and RIT China - Weihai in Weihai, China.
- The University of Kentucky, based in Lexington, has operated two satellite campuses at different times:
  - In 1948, the university opened an extension campus in Covington known as the Northern Extension Center. In 1968, this campus was separated from UK, becoming the institution now known as Northern Kentucky University, which four years later moved to its current campus in Highland Heights.
  - Since 1996, the UK College of Engineering has operated a satellite campus at West Kentucky Community and Technical College in Paducah. This campus currently offers bachelor's degree programs in chemical and mechanical engineering.
- The Columbus State Community College, a college for 2 year Associate Degrees in Ohio, Has a main campus in Columbus, a secondary campus in Delaware, and several local places that host classes, called "Regional Learning Centers", in Dublin, Westerville, and Bolton Field.
- The Deakin University has four domestic campuses in Australia: the Melbourne Burwood Campus, the Geelong Waterfront Campus, the Geelong Waurn Ponds Campus, and the Warrnambool Campus. Additionally, Deakin University has two international satellite campuses: the GIFT City Campus, the first international satellite campus in India and located in the Gujarat International Finance Tec-City (GIFT City), and the Deakin University Lancaster University Indonesia Campus.

== Uses outside higher education ==
=== Pre-tertiary education ===
The Farm School in Tennessee allows homeschooling families to affiliate with it through a "Satellite Campuses" program. This program enables homeschooled children to be enrolled in a state-recognized school that is not affiliated with any religious denomination.

=== Religious organisations ===
Churches attempting to expand their reach by offering worship and other programs in new locations may refer to these added locations as "satellite campuses." Some megachurches have increased their number of parishioners and extended their geographic reach by opening new locations that are referred to as "satellite campuses." A satellite church campus may use video technology to connect to the church's main location.
