= Ushio, Inc. =

Japanese company

- Native name: ウシオ電機株式会社
- Company type: Public KK
- Traded as: TYO: 6925
- ISIN: JP3156400008
- Industry: Lighting; Electronics
- Founded: March 23, 1964; 62 years ago
- Headquarters: Marunouchi, Chiyoda, Tokyo, Japan
- Area served: Worldwide
- Key people: Jiro Ushio (Chairman); Koji Naito (CEO)
- Products: Electronic components; Lighting equipment; Cinema video projectors; Logistic services; Steppers
- Revenue: ▲JPY 173.4 billion (FY 2017) (US$ 1.5 billion) (FY 2017)
- Net income: ▲JPY 11 billion (FY 2017) (US$ 99 million) (FY 2017)
- Number of employees: 5,847 (consolidated, as of March 31, 2017)
- Subsidiaries: Ushio Europe; Christie Digital System
- Website: Official website

Ushio, Inc. (ウシオ電機株式会社, Ushio Denki Kabushiki-gaisha) is a Japanese company headquartered in Tokyo. It was established in 1964, and its main business is in lighting equipment.

== History ==
Ushio, Inc., was established in 1964 from the electric lighting department of Ushio Industrial, Inc., which had grown in 1916 as Himeji Electric Bulb Company, out of a department of Chūgoku Gōdō Denki, owned jointly by the predecessor companies of Kansai Electric Power and Chūgoku Electric Power. Ushio moved its headquarters from Himeji, Hyōgo Prefecture, to Tokyo in 1971, while retaining its main research & development center in Himeji.

Ushio, Inc. is headed by its Chairman Jirō Ushio (牛尾治朗, 1931- ), who was the chairman of the influential Japan Association of Corporate Executives between 1995 and 1999, and was the president of Japan Productivity Center (日本生産性本部) between 2003 and 2014. Ushio Industrial, Inc., was named after his father, Kenji Ushio (牛尾健治, 1898-1958), a native of Himeji like his son.

Ushio was listed in the Second Section of Tokyo Stock Exchange in 1970, and in the First Section in 1980.

Ushio entered the European market in 1985, with the foundation of Ushio Europe B.V., which is located in Oude Meer, the Netherlands.

== Business ==
Ushio's main business is in lighting equipment, from halogen lamps to more sophisticated digital lighting and video processing equipment. In 1992, Ushio bought Christie, a U.S.-based global visual technologies company.

== Subsidiaries ==
- Ushio Lighting, Chuo-ku, Tokyo, Japan
- Xebex, Inc., Chuo-ku, Tokyo
- Maxray, Inc., Chiyoda-ku, Tokyo
- ADTEC Engineering, Chiyoda-ku, Tokyo
- Christie Digital Systems, Cypress, California, United States, and Kitchener, Ontario, Canada
- Ushio Europe B.V., Oude Meer, the Netherlands
- Ushio Germany GmbH, Steinhöring, Germany
- Ushio France S.A.R.L. Paris, France
- Ushio Poland Sp.z o.o. Błonie, Poland
- Ushio Korea Inc, Gangnam Daero Seocho-Gu, Seoul Korea

== See also ==
- Lighting equipment
