= MicroTiles =

MicroTiles are discontinued modular rear projection cube units designed, developed and marketed by Christie Digital. The building-block nature of the system made the configuration of the overall screen area and shape flexible. This allowed for simple traditional rectangular displays, and more complex non-standard shapes.

MicroTile units had sensors to detect whether there is another unit next to it, allowing the display controller to automatically determine the tile layout and the size and magnification of the video picture to be displayed across the screen area.

The successor of MicroTiles, MicroTiles LED is an advanced cabinet-free LED display technology also designed, developed, and marketed by Christie Digital. MicroTiles LED allow for flexible display options, with no limit on the number of tiles in a display. MicroTiles LED creates a virtually seamless canvas and can create curves and unique geometric configurations.

The 90-degree corner of the MicroTiles LED make complex configurations possible and the tiles automatically recognize each tile in a design to maintain uniformity in color and brightness across a whole display.

== History ==
MicroTiles were born from a conversation between Christie Digital's Bob Rushby (CTO) and Mike Perkins (senior product developer) at a Tokyo hotel bar, during a business trip in 2005.

The system was in development for two years before Christie first introduced the first MicroTiles display cubes in 2009. The official North American launch was in New York, on December 9, 2009. The launch in Europe was at the ISE tradeshow in Amsterdam, February 2-4, 2010. The system was later launched in Japan on April 22, 2010.

Notable installations featuring MicroTiles include the 2010 redesign of the television set of the US show The Colbert Report, a display featuring 252 MicroTiles in the NASCAR Hall of Fame in Charlotte, North Carolina, and a 121 million pixel wall at the L’Oreal headquarters in Paris. Another notable installation is at the Cleveland Museum of Art where a 40ft long MicroTiles wall is equipped to allow users to interact with the wall and open as many as 20 separate interfaces to explore the museum’s collection.

MicroTiles were discontinued in 2019 following the introduction of MicroTiles LED at ISE 2019 in Amsterdam.

== Original System Design ==
The original MicroTiles display cubes used a projector light engine and a TI DLP digital micromirror device to create a short throw lens rear projection of images onto a removable tile screen. Each tile has microprocessor control to communicate with neighboring tiles to auto-adjust and balance both the color and brightness across all the tiles in the display. The building-block nature of the system made the configuration of the overall screen area and shape flexible and allowed users to design displays in simple traditional rectangular displays or more complex non-standard shapes.

=== Color reproduction and resolution ===
The system is capable of exceeding the NTSC specification for colour gamut by 115%. Because the LED light engine has a saturated color output, the image appears to be about 25% brighter than a similar lamp-based projector with the same lumen output. This is due to the Helmholtz–Kohlrausch effect. According to Mike Perkins, the subjective effect of this is that the purer colors from MicroTiles are punchier, more vivid, and more engaging.

Each tile is 16" × 12" (408 mm × 306 mm) and has a native resolution of 720 × 540 with a pixel pitch of 0.57 mm. The total resolution of the display can be a maximum of the sum of the native resolutions of each tile. Lower input resolutions are automatically up-scaled to fill the display area, which effectively increases the pixel pitch of the image displayed.

=== Self-configuring ===
Each tile has microprocessor control to communicate with neighboring tiles to auto-adjust and balance both the color and brightness across all the tiles in the display. An electronic control unit (ECU) talks to each tile and creates an internal map of each tile position, and scales the video input across the whole display. This eliminates the need for calibrating the display manually.

=== Maintenance ===
The servicing of a MicroTile unit in a display has also been a primary design consideration. Servicing is done from the front, and all major components, including the light engine, can be replaced in 15 minutes or less. This can be carried out without shutting down or dismantling the rest of the display. The LED light source is rated at 65,000 hours lifespan to 50% brightness. This is the equivalent of the system running continuously for seven years.

=== Cabinet design ===
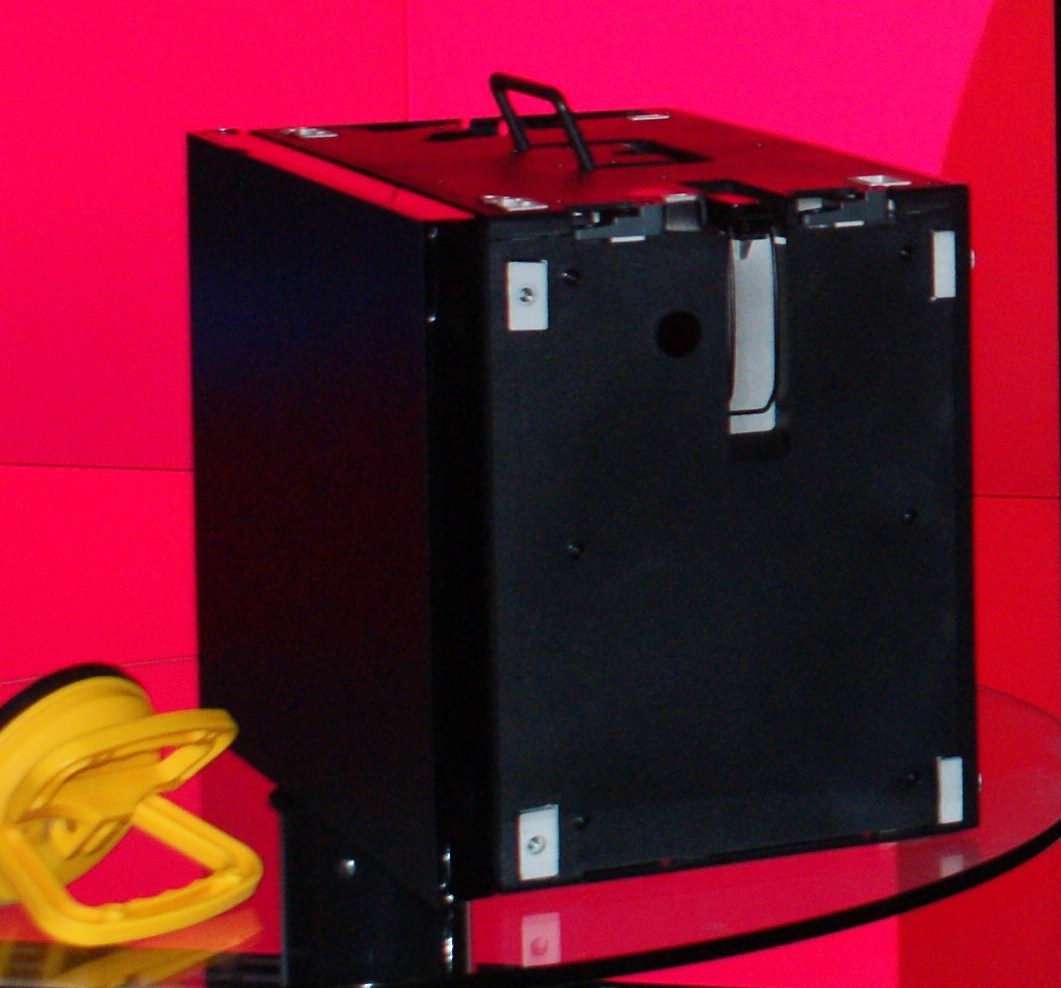
MicroTile unit with suction cup tool for front screen removal

The 10.2" (260 mm) depth tile chassis is equipped with precision fittings allowing tiles to be mated to each other side by side both horizontally and vertically, allowing displays of various shapes and sizes to be built. The screen is a matte-finished polycarbonate material mounted on a metal frame which is held onto the front of the tile cabinet magnetically. The frame is designed so that the seams visible in the picture between each tile in a screen array are kept to a minimum of about 1 mm. The power and signal connectors are on the rear of the cabinet, and once installed, there is no further need to access the rear panel for adjustments or maintenance. All mechanical maintenance is carried out from the front of the unit, with access gained by detaching the magnetically held screen with a suction grip tool.

=== Video input and control ===
The video input to the system is via a DVI connector on the Electronic Control Unit (ECU), and it can accept video modes up to WUXGA (1920 × 1200). This is typically fed from a video processor or media player with a DVI interface as the video output. The ECU is also connected to the MicroTiles in a daisy chain or ring network using a customised version of the DisplayPort interface.

As well as carrying the video information, the DisplayPort links carry two way control and monitoring signalling between the tiles and the ECU. The ECU performs automatic calibration of light output and color control to ensure that the picture displayed is uniform across the array of tiles. MicroTiles displays can use multiple ECUs to allow higher resolution images to be displayed on large arrays. In this case one ECU arbitrates to become the master, and it assumes the role for device control; the other slave ECUs are just used for image signal processing.

The MicroTiles display system can be configured in shapes and sizes which don't conform to standard rectangular aspect ratio shapes and resolutions, and the number of pixels in the WUXGA video mode (about 2.3 million) is near the maximum that one ECU can display on a MicroTiles display. This allows resolutions to be displayed on smaller tile arrays at the native 0.57 mm pixel pitch (for up to six tiles)—larger arrays need more ECUs to be added to the system, which means that multiple media player outputs will be needed to drive the extra ECUs. If the highest quality native resolution display is not necessary, then lower resolution video inputs to the ECUs will be scaled across the display.

Built-in sensors in the cabinet top, bottom and sides allow the ECU to communicate with each tile and discover its neighbors, allowing it to map the array layout automatically. The ECU will then tell each tile what portion of the video input to display, so that an entire image is correctly formed and scaled across the whole display.

The ECU monitors the light output of the LED light sources in each tile and automatically adjusts the color and brightness of each tile to ensure the picture is uniform over the whole array.

== Current Technology ==
Christie introduced the second generation of MicroTiles- MicroTiles LED- in 2019. MicroTiles LED are a cabinet free, direct view LED. They use the Christie VividLife™ LED video processing platform to deliver premium solutions and designs that go beyond traditional LED systems.

=== Installation and arrangement ===
MicroTiles LED have a QuickMount installation system which uses steel mounting sheets and machined wall anchors to eliminate alignment challenges. The actual tiles connect with magnets, a system dubbed Click-n-Go, making the population of a display incredibly fast.

The MicroTiles have 90-degree inside and outside corners, allowing them to create both convex and concave curves, as well as more complex geometric designs.

=== Configuration and maintenance ===
MicroTiles LED automatically identify and locate each tile in a design to maintain uniformity in color and brightness. This is achieved using Christe’s patented Infrared Neighbor Detection™ and AutoMatch™.

Control of the MicroTiles LED is web-based which allows for customization, optimization, and troubleshooting can all be done in real time.

MicroTiles LED are front serviceable, giving technicians complete access. Remote power and control components can be installed away from the LED wall to remove heat and noise.

== Examples in use ==
Since the product launch, the system has been used in some installations that can be seen by the public:

- In January 2010, the re-designed television set of the US show The Colbert Report contained four angled vertical columns of MicroTiles behind the presenter, and three horizontal displays around the floor.
- The NASCAR Hall of Fame opened in May 2010 in Charlotte, North Carolina, with a large display made up of 252 MicroTiles (a 14 ft × 18 ft "fan Billboard") flown from the roof in the Great Hall.
- The Christie MicroTile wall at the University of Waterloo Stratford Campus is three stories tall and made up of 150 individual MicroTiles.

== See also ==
- Digital Light Processing
- Comparison of display technology
