= Lightcast =

A lightcast is a functional analysis and mapping of the illumination produced by a light source. It is used to map the physical characteristics of light emission for use in functional systems. A lightcast includes the entire zone of illumination while a ray cast measures lighting of a single point in space near the light source.

A lightcast is typically measured using all components of a combined lighting system, including the illumination source and any reflectors, lenses, filters, and diffusers, and the measurement may include average brightness across a flat two-dimensional surface as well as brightness across a curved of spherical surface. Color spectrum may be included, as well as moving and changing effects over time such flickering from a candle.
