= University of Waterloo Faculty of Arts =

Faculty at the University of Waterloo, Ontario, Canada

- Type: Public
- Established: 1960
- Parent institution: University of Waterloo
- Dean: Alexie Tcheuyap
- Location: Waterloo, Ontario, Canada
- Colours: Orange
- Website: uwaterloo.ca/arts/

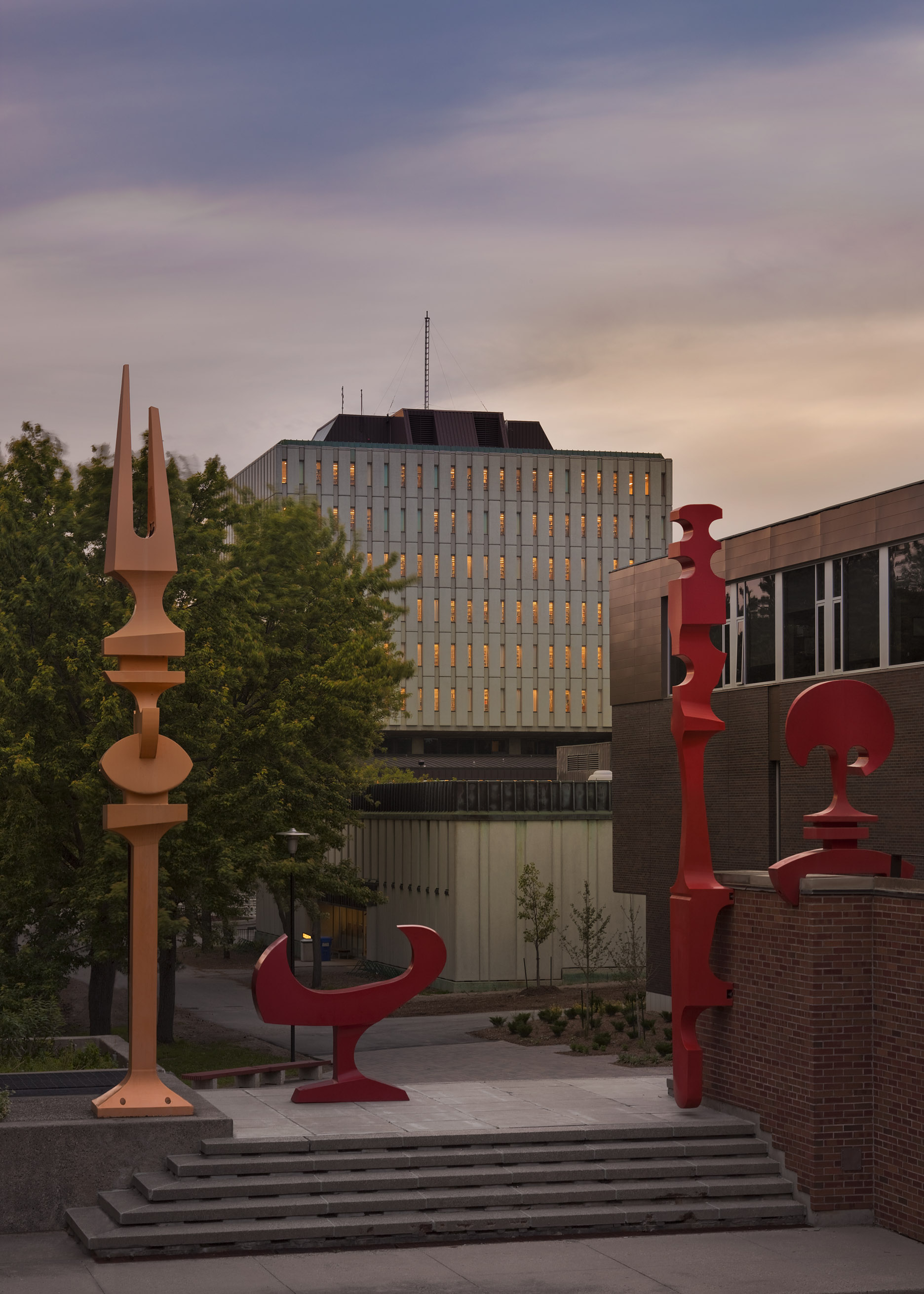
The Dana Porter Arts Library, with sculptures by Ron Baird in the foreground

The University of Waterloo Faculty of Arts is one of six faculties at the University of Waterloo in Waterloo, Ontario, Canada.

== Departments ==
Following a reorganization of the faculty on 1 July 2026, the Faculty of Arts presently houses six schools: the School of Critical and Creative Humanities, the School of Social, Political and Historical Research, the School of Economics, the School of Psychology, the School of Accounting and Finance and the Stratford School of Interaction Design and Business.

The School of Critical Design and Creative Humanities contains the departments of Communication Studies, English Language & Literature, Fine Arts, French Studies, Germanic & Slavic Studies, Spanish & Latin American Studies, and Theatre and Performance. The School of Social, Political and Historical Research contains the departments of Anthropology, Classical Studies, History, Philosophy, Political Science, Religious Studies, and Sociology & Legal Studies.

The Faculty of Arts offers seven undergraduate entry programs, over thirty majors and more than 400 degree options.

The University of Waterloo, along with University of Guelph and Wilfrid Laurier University is a member of the Tri-University Graduate History Program, which combines the history departments of the three universities at the graduate level. Graduate students are registered at one of the three universities according to their supervisor, but can take courses at any of the campuses. This allows the group to have more diverse course offerings more efficiently.

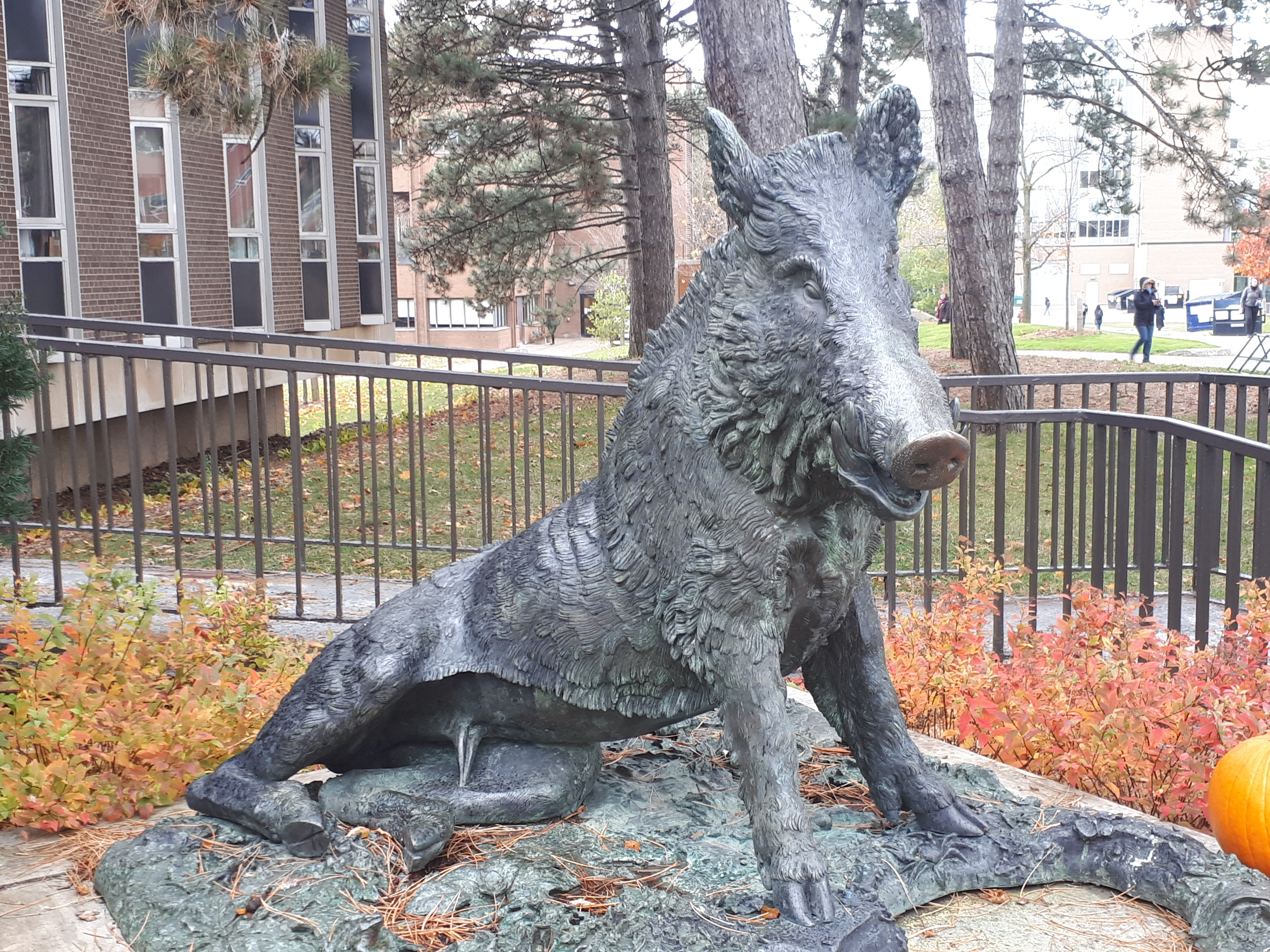
A copy of the Porcellino sculpture outside the Modern Languages Building serves as a mascot for the Faculty of Arts

== Research ==
=== Research centres ===
The Faculty of Arts is home to seventeen research centres, including:

- The Centre for Accounting Research and Education (CARE),
- Canadian Centre of Arts and Technology (CCAT),
- The Canadian Language & Literacy Research Network,
- The UW Centre for Child Studies,
- The Canadian Centre for Cultural Innovation (CCCI),
- The Centre for Cultural Management (CCM),
- The Early Childhood Education Centre (ECEC),
- The Centre for Election Studies,
- The Centre for Advanced Studies in Finance,
- The Centre on Foreign Policy and Federalism (CFPF),
- The Centre for Learning and Teaching Through Technology (LT3),
- The Southwestern Ontario Research Data Centre (SWORDC),
- The Survey Research Centre (SRC),
- Synaesthesia Research Centre,
- The UW Centre for Mental Health Research
- The Waterloo Centre for German Studies (WCGS),
- Waterloo Decision Research (WDR).

=== Endowed chairs ===
- In 2007, the Department of German and Slavic Studies was granted funding for a "Right Honourable John G. Diefenbaker Memorial Chair in German Literary Studies."
- Since 2009, the Department of Philosophy has hosted the "Wolfe Chair in Science and Technology Studies" as well as the "Waterloo Chair in Science and Society."
- The Department of Philosophy also provides an endowed visiting professorship, the "Humphrey Professorship in Feminist Philosophy".
- The Department of Jewish studies is home to the "Joe and Wolfe Lebovic Chair in Jewish Studies".

== Student societies ==
Students in the Faculty of Arts are represented by the Arts Student Union (ASU) which has many roles including hosting social events, management of a student tuck shop, and representing student interests on various boards within and outside of the Faculty. Additionally, all students pay into the Arts Endowment Fund which funds improvements to equipment and supplies for students.

Within ASU there are 27 societies representing programs in the Faculty.

== Notable alumni ==
- David Eby: Premier of British Columbia (English)
- Rupi Kaur: poet (English, rhetoric and professional writing)
