= Christie (technology company) =

Projection and visual display manufacturer

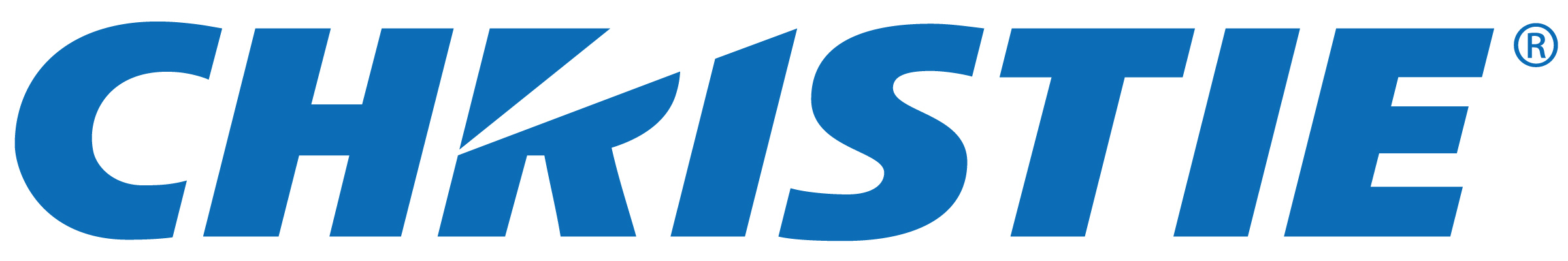

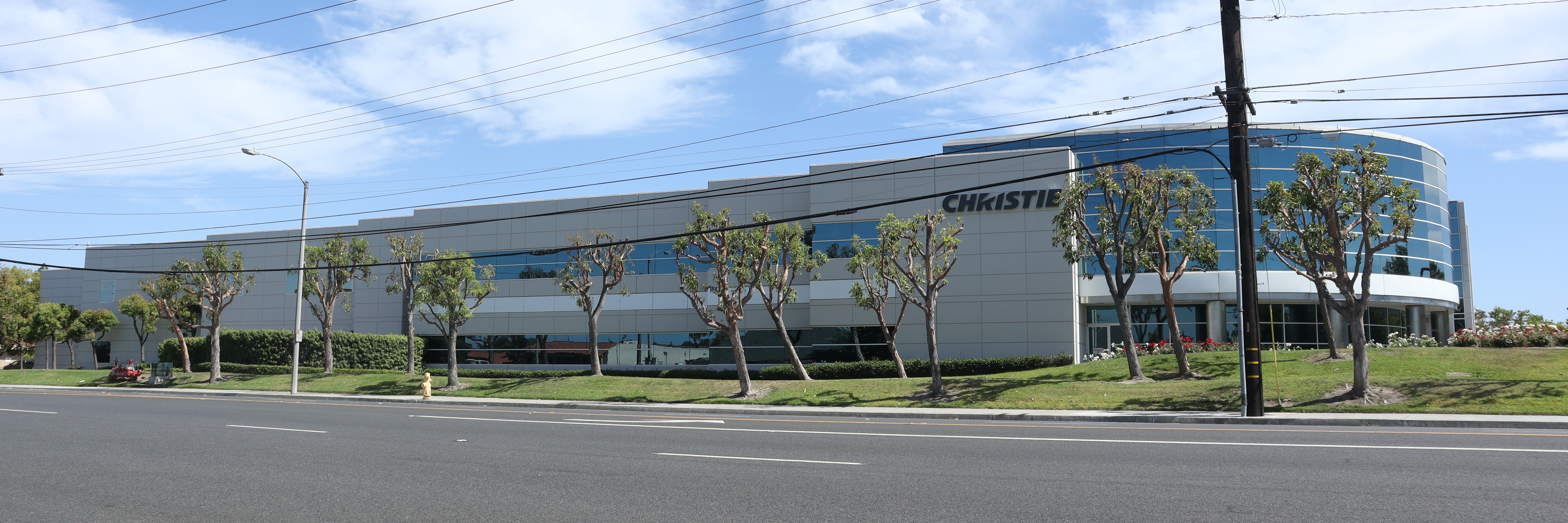
- Headquarters in Cypress, California, U.S.
- Type: Private
- Industry: Professional audio-visual technology
- Founded: 1929
- Founder: S.L. Christie
- Headquarters: Cypress, California
- Key people: Michael Phipps, President & CEO, Christie Digital Systems, Inc.
- Products: Projectors, LED video walls, LCD displays, image processors
- Services: Design, manufacture, deploy, and support professional AV and cinema display technology
- Parent: Ushio, Inc.
- Website: https://www.christiedigital.com

Christie is a visual display technologies company specializing in digital projection, LED video wall displays, projection software and tools, and image processors for cinema and professional AV markets. The company has been granted over 100 patents.

Christie is headquartered in Cypress, California, U.S. with engineering in Kitchener, Ontario, Canada and manufacturing in Shenzhen, China. Christie has offices in 15 countries.

== History ==
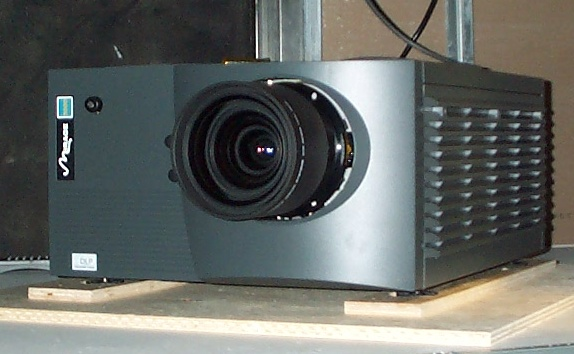
Mirage 5000, a DLP projector sold by Christie around 2001

=== 1920s ===
Christie was founded in 1929 under the name McColpin-Christie Corp. by S.L. Christie and J.W. McColpin in Los Angeles, California. Christie was originally in the business of battery chargers and power supplies.

=== 1940s ===
McColpin-Christie Corp. introduces six-phase full-wave rectifiers for 1 kW carbon arc lamps to the motion picture industry. This rectifier increased the number of impulses per second to reduce the flicker from projectors.

=== 1960s and 1970s ===
During the 1960s, under the leadership of Tom Christie, the company began manufacturing 35 mm film movie projectors, lamp houses, lamp consoles, and film platter systems.

=== 1990s ===
The projector division of Christie was acquired by Ushio in 1992.

Christie acquired the Kitchener, Ontario-based digital projection business of Electrohome in 1999 as part of their move to digital cinema.

Christie was the first licensee of Texas Instruments' Digital Light Processing technology.

In 1999, Christie introduced the DCP-H, or DigiPro, the world's first digital cinema projector. The DigiPro was sold to Pixar Animation Studios for the release of Toy Story 2.

=== 2000s ===
Christie acquired Vista Controls Systems in 2007, makers of video processing systems, including the Spyder.

In 2009, Christie launched MicroTiles, modular LED-powered DLP-based units that can be built together into a large video wall-style display.

=== 2010s ===
In 2013, Christie launched the Matrix StIM WQ and Matrix SIM WQ projector designed for simulation and training applications.

In 2015, Christie acquired Coolux, best known for its Pandoras Box product family of media and show control systems.

Christie launched a new projection system using RGB laser technology with colors approaching Rec. 2020 color space.

In 2019, Christie launched MicroTiles LED, a direct-view LED display consisting of a mounting chassis and three rectangular modules which snap onto the chassis via magnets.

As of 2019, more than 65,000 Christie projectors have been installed worldwide, used in more than 10 million screenings.

=== 2020s ===
During Expo 2020 in Dubai, 252 Christie RGB pure laser projectors were used to illuminate the Al Wasl Dome. The dome was built as the centerpiece of the Expo site and holds a Guinness World Record for the largest interactive immersive dome.

Christie acquired Cinergy, a cloud-based enterprise platform for movie theaters, from Digital Cinema Implementation Partners, LLC (DCIP) in 2022.

In 2025, Christie released the Eclipse G3, a 6DLP projector with true HDR, and the Sapphire 4K40-RGBH projector, the first high-brightness hybrid RGB pure laser and laser phosphor projector of its kind.

== Technological developments ==
By the 1950s, Christie had established itself as a manufacturer of 35mm film projectors, lamp houses, lamp consoles, and film platter systems, which remained the company's focus until the late 1990s, when they shifted to developing technology for digital projection for both cinema and professional AV and video wall display technology.

=== Digital cinema ===
After acquiring the Canadian DLP projection company Electrohome, Christie received the first license from Texas Instruments for the digital cinema technology. Along with Texas Instruments, they marketed the first digital cinema projector to be adopted by Hollywood. They began installing digital projectors in cinemas in 2006 as part of the world's first large-scale digital cinema deployment to almost 4,000 screens across the U.S.

=== High frame rates for cinema ===
Christie was one of the first manufacturers to develop projectors capable of showing films at high frame rates. During the production of The Hobbit (film series), the first film released in 3D at 48 fps, Peter Jackson's post-production company collaborated with Christie as part of research and development on HFR-integrated media blocks and projectors.

In 2016, Director Ang Lee was the first to release a film in 4K resolution, 3D, and 120 frames per second per eye, which required the use of two Christie 4K Mirage laser projectors to show the film at that frame rate.

=== HDR ===
Christie entered an agreement with James Cameron's Lightstorm Entertainment in 2017, to help develop new RGB laser projectors and share research in high dynamic range (HDR) development.

=== Video walls ===
In 2009, Christie released MicroTiles display cubes using a projector light engine and a DLP digital micromirror device to create a short throw lens rear-projection of images onto a removable tile screen. In 2019, it was replaced by MicroTiles LED, a cabinet-free LED video wall.

=== Virtual production ===
As part of a collaboration with partners at KinoFlo, Christie developed a virtual production solution that includes the use of high frame rate RGB laser projectors as an alternative to LED volumes for on-set virtual production and green screen fatigue. (Note: Attributed to multiple references:)

== Awards ==
Christie has received three Academy Awards since 1982.

The company won its first Academy Award for Technical Achievement in 1982 with LaVezzi Machine Works, for the design and manufacture of the Ultramittent film transport for Christie motion picture projectors. The award for Technical Achievement was awarded to employee Clark F. Crites in 1998 for the design and development of the Christie ELF 1-C Endless Loop Film Transport and Storage System.

In 2024, principal product developer Michael Perkins was a member of the team awarded the Academy Scientific and Technical Award for the design and development of the Christie E3LH Dolby Vision Cinema Projection System. (Note: Attributed to multiple references:)
