= Colorado Experiment =

Bodybuilding experiment (1973)

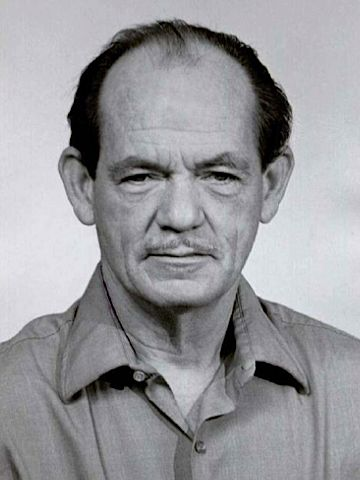
Nautilus-inventor Arthur Jones personally trained Casey Viator for every workout. Training was intense, progressive, and involved a negative-only repetition style on 50 percent of the exercises.

The Colorado Experiment was a bodybuilding experiment run by Arthur Jones using Nautilus equipment at the Colorado State University in May 1973.

It is of interest due to its claims that incredible results can be achieved with a small number of sessions using single sets of high intensity repetitions to momentary muscle failure focusing on negative or lowering multi-joint exercises. The first subject, Casey Viator, gained 63 pounds (29 kg) of muscle in 28 days and the second, Arthur Jones, gained 15 pounds (6.8 kg) in 22 days.

These claims are considered controversial because it was only performed with two subjects who were not "average," but regaining pre-existing muscle mass. Mike Mentzer did compare these results to the results of top bodybuilder Arnold Schwarzenegger’s results of a gain of approximately 15 pounds (6.8 kg) (verbal estimates from Arnold of starting at 210 pounds (95 kg) and ending at 225 pounds (102 kg)) while working out 4 hours per day, 6 days a week for 4 months.

== Results ==
After stopping exercise for more than two years, 1971 Mr America, Viator was invited by Arthur Jones to participate in what was to be known as the Colorado Experiment. The primary purpose was to prove or disprove the efficacy of pure Nautilus training in developing a champion physique. This study was performed at a time where the vast majority of amateur and professional bodybuilders developed their physiques through traditional workouts involving the use of barbells, dumbbells, and cable equipment. The results concluded that Viator gained more than 60 pounds (27 kg) (of muscular mass) in 28 days with only 12 high-intensity workouts, each of which were less than 30 minutes. Viator actually gained 45 pounds (20 kg), but Jones conjectured that he lost 18 pounds (8.2 kg) of fat, giving him a net lean gain of 63 pounds (29 kg). In fact, he most likely gained fat, as Mike Mentzer later claimed Viator was "literally force-fed." By comparison, the typical amount of muscle gain (not fat) in an average person is 5–10 pounds (2.3–4.5 kg) per year.

Muscle gains of eight of other subjects:

1. David Hudlow built 18.5 pounds (8.4 kg) of muscle in 11 days. Documented in The New High-Intensity Training.
2. Eddie Mueller built 18.25 pounds (8.28 kg) of muscle in 10 weeks. Documented in Massive Muscles in 10 Weeks.
3. Todd Waters built 15.25 pounds (6.92 kg) of muscle in 6 weeks. Documented in High-Intensity Strength Training.
4. Jeff Turner built 18.25 pounds (8.28 kg) of muscle in 4 weeks. Documented in GROW.
5. Keith Whitley built 29 pounds (13 kg) of muscle in 6 weeks. Documented in Bigger Muscles in 42 Days.
6. David Hammond built 22.5 pounds (10.2 kg) of muscle in 6 weeks. Documented in Bigger Muscle in 42 Days.
7. Joe Walker added 17.38 pounds (7.88 kg) of muscle in 6 weeks. Documented in The Body Fat Breakthrough.
8. Shane Poole built 19.34 pounds (8.77 kg) of muscle in 6 weeks. Documented in The Body Fat Breakthrough.

== See also ==
- Muscle hypertrophy
