= Gustav Zander =

Swedish physician and orthopedist (1835–1920)

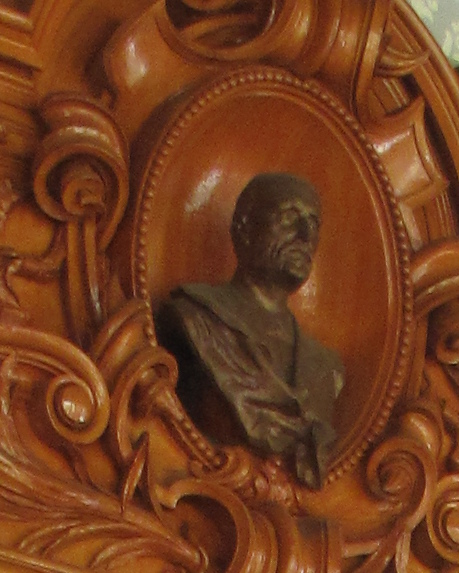
- Gustav Zander bust in Zander Hall, Imperial Spa, Karlovy Vary, Czech Republic
- Born: Jonas Gustav Vilhelm Zander; 29 March 1835; Stockholm
- Died: 17 June 1920 (aged 85)
- Occupations: Physician, Orthopedist

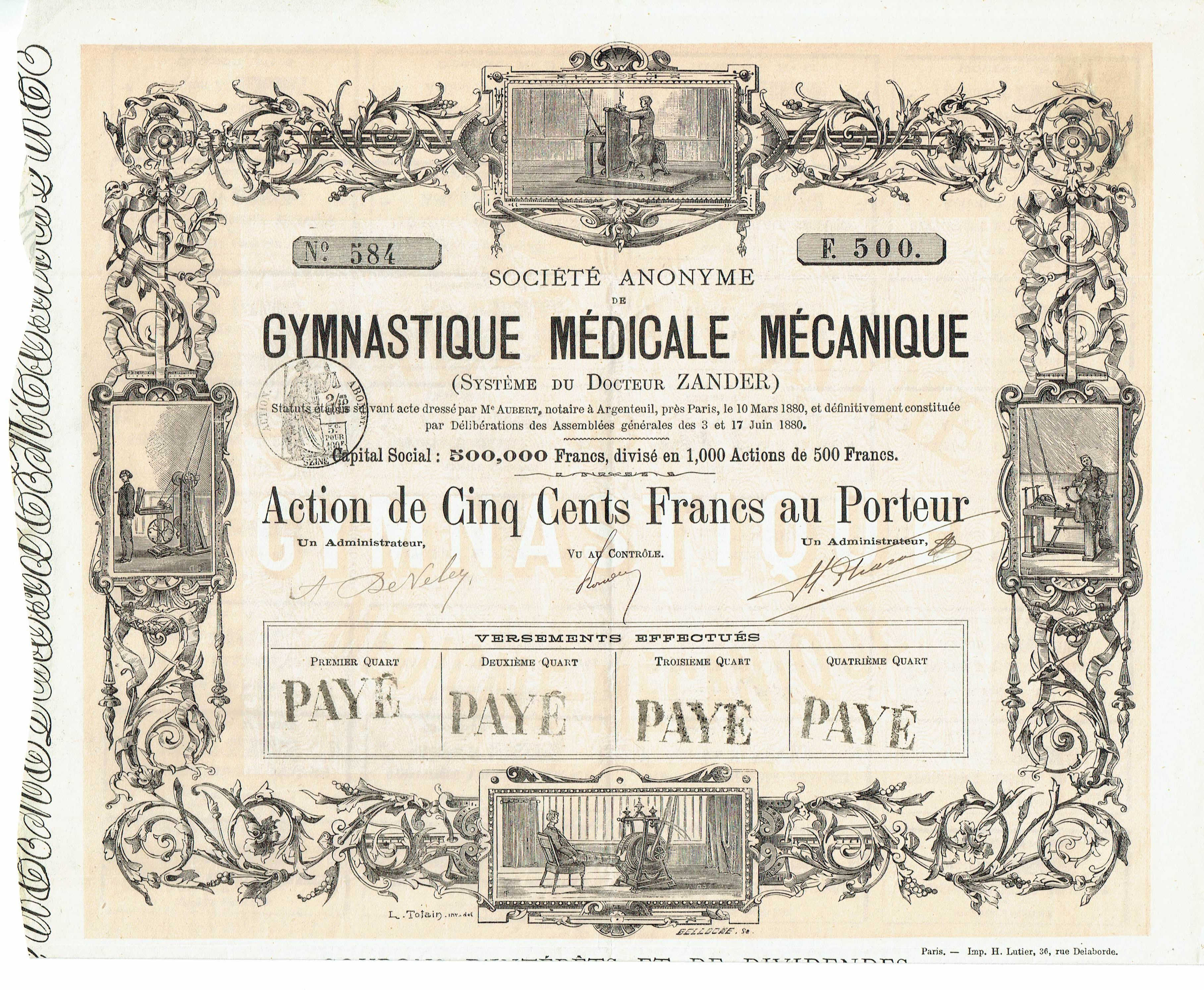
Share of the S.A. de Gymnastique Médicale Mécanique (Système du Docteur Zander), issued 17. June 1880; with pictures of different Zander machines

Jonas Gustav Vilhelm Zander (29 March 1835 in Stockholm – 17 June 1920) was a Swedish physician, orthopedist and one of the originators of mechanotherapy. He is known for inventing a therapeutic method of exercise carried out by means of a special apparatus. He began his work in the 1860s. He established the Zander Therapeutical Institute in Stockholm.

In 1880 he became a lecturer of the Stockholm University, and in 1896 he became a member of the Royal Swedish Academy of Sciences.

Zander exhibited his Institute at the 1876 Centennial Exhibition in Philadelphia where his exercise machines won a gold medal. By 1906 he had established Institutes in 146 countries, and by 1910 "ample numbers of Americans were familiar with the machines". They were established at health spas, and some were privately owned though expensive.

== Arthur Jones Controversy ==
In the 1970s Arthur Jones, invented machines known as Nautilus to aid with High Intensity Training . Nautilus workout machines proved to be very similar to Gustav Zander's exercising machines which were widespread in America in the early 20th century, but Jones insists that he made these discoveries without any knowledge of Zander's discoveries:

"So, in attempts to improve my exercise results, I designed and built a total of about twenty very sophisticated exercise machines, then believing that these were the first exercise machines ever built by anybody. But many years later, I learned that a doctor named Gustav Zander had designed and built a number of exercise machines in Europe nearly a hundred years before I built my first one; I did not copy Zander's work and learned nothing from him, was not even aware of his work until long after I had made the same discoveries that he had made. But if I had known about, and understood, Zander's work, it would have saved me a lot of time and a rather large fortune in money, because the man was a genius; his only problem was that he lived about a century ahead of his time, at a time when very few people cared about exercise and even fewer knew anything about it." The machines were based on the same principle of variable resistance but were not in any other way similar.
