= Lagree =

Type of strength training

Lagree is a type of strength training on a resistance-based, spring-loaded machine known as a reformer. The method is often described as a "high-intensity, low-impact" in magazines and marketing. Lagree aims to build intensity through the spring-created tension that is best described by Hooke's Law. In simple terms, the principle explains how the farther a spring stretches, the more tension it creates as it tries to snap back into its original position. Reformer-based workouts encourage tension through eccentric movement (lengthening contractions) and concentric movements (shortening contractions). The Lagree method suggests that through such movements, participants can activate slow-twitch muscle fibers, building strength and mind-body connection. Through all of this, the goal in Lagree is to move slowly and maximize tension rather than repetitions.

Among its purported health benefits, Lagree claims to improve cardiorespiratory endurance, strength, and limberness. Some studies also suggest that reformer-based exercise may improve athletic ability, particularly among activities that require core strength, balance, and flexibility.

== History ==
Lagree was founded by Sebastien Lagree in the 1990s. In 2006, Sebastien Lagree created the Proformer, the first Lagree-optimized reformer. Since then, Lagree has developed numerous machines. Though Lagree is a business, in conversation, Lagree often refers to the method itself rather than the company, especially with its recent rise in popularity on social media. Similar to how Joseph Pilates created Pilates, which later became a global workout trend, Sebastien Lagree's created Lagree as a method that could be adopted and taught at workout studios everywhere. Since Lagree requires specialized equipment often found in gyms or in people's homes, most Lagree activity takes place in workout studios.

=== Lagree 1.0 ===
When Lagree was first created, the method prioritized isolating specific muscle groups. Lagree 1.0 emphasized five leading principles, known as the "Five Magic Keys": "effective slow tempo, effective resistance, effective range of motion, effective duration, and effective quick transition times." Though the method has evolved over the years, these Five Magic Keys have remained at the forefront of Lagree.

=== Lagree 2.0 ===
In 2020, Lagree introduced Lagree 2.0. One key change in this generation of Lagree was the Lightning Spring Change, a wireless spring-changing method that allows instructors control participants springs with the click of a button. The goal of this new device was to minimize transition time between workout moves to maximize time under tension, which may support muscular development.

With the Lightning Spring Change came new benchmark goals for how long each exercise repetition should take, how long individuals should stay in the same exercise, and how long transitions should be. Lagree 2.0 suggests over three minutes per workout set, a count tempo of 6-10, and fewer exercises to reduce transitions and maximize muscular time under tension. These rules differ from Lagree 1.0, as Lagree 2.0 claims that "intensity comes from duration and tempo, not from load." Lagree 2.0 prioritizes "mastering the workout" and not just doing the workout to chase "The Three S," known as shakes, sweat, and eventual muscle soreness.

=== Lagree 3.0 ===
Lagree 3.0 essentially mirrors Lagree 2.0, but it places greater emphasis on joint health and alignment. Joint protection and sustainable training are emphasized in Lagree 3.0. Lagree 3.0 aims to maintain the same intensity as Lagree 2.0 while accounting for joint protection and potential inflammation issues. Additionally, Lagree 3.0 brings attention to optimizing one's own range of motion.

Beyond focusing on a safe range of motion, Lagree 3.0 also introduces a new machine called the Evo Pro. The Evo Pro was designed to support this latest method, offering more adjustable features. The machine is also Lightning Spring Change compatible, maintaining the quick transition time principle found in Lagree 2.0 to increase time under tension.

== Comparison with Pilates ==
Lagree is often confused with Pilates, as both are full-body workouts and involve similar equipment. One key difference between Pilates and Lagree is that Lagree can only be done on a machine while Pilates can be done on a mat or a machine. In instances where Pilates occurs on a reformer, the method still prioritizes different goals than Lagree. While Pilates focuses on balance and bodily control, Lagree focuses more heavily on continuous and intense movement. Pilates is often thought of as more accessible and better suited for people who may be recovering from injuries since Lagree is a high-intensity workout. While Lagree highlights strength and endurance, Pilates more closely considers flexibility and stretch breaks and can be practiced in a wider range of spaces. Though Pilates and Lagree are similar, not one of these methods is necessarily better than the other, as they both offer different purported benefits.
