= High-intensity training =

Intensive training in short burst with long recovery

High-intensity training (HIT) is a form of strength training popularized in the 1970s by Arthur Jones, the founder of Nautilus. The training focuses on performing quality weight training repetitions to the point of momentary muscular failure. The training takes into account the number of repetitions, the amount of weight, and the amount of time the muscle is exposed to tension in order to maximize the amount of muscle fiber recruitment.

== Principles ==
Unlike traditional workout routines that emphasize long hours in the gym, HIT principles require short but highly intense workouts. Exercises are performed with a high level of effort, or intensity, where it is thought that it will stimulate the body to produce an increase in muscular strength and size. Advocates of HIT believe that this method is superior for strength and size building to most other methods which, for example, may stress lower weights with larger volume (sets x reps x weight).

As strength improves with high-intensity training (HIT), the weight or resistance used in the exercises should be gradually increased over time. This progressive overload is believed to provide the muscles with enough stimulus to continue improving and growing. An inverse relationship exists between how intensely and how long one can exercise. As a result, high-intensity workouts are generally kept brief. After a high-intensity workout, as with any workout, the body requires time to recover and produce the responses stimulated during the workout, so there is more emphasis on rest and recovery in the HIT philosophy than in most other weight training methods. In any workout, not just HIT, training schedules should allow adequate time between workouts for recovery (and adaptation).

While many typical HIT programs comprise a single-set per exercise, tri-weekly, full-body workout, many variations exist in specific recommendations of set and exercise number, workout routines, volume and frequency of training. The common thread is an emphasis on a high level of effort, relatively brief and infrequent (i.e. not daily) training, and the cadence of a lift, which will be very slow compared to a non-HIT weight training routine.

Most HIT advocates stress the use of controlled lifting speeds and strict form, with special attention paid to avoiding any bouncing, jerking, or yanking of the weight or machine movement arm during exercise. Technical HIT advice varies from lifting the weights smoothly and at a natural pace, to timing the lifts, peaking at hold and descent. In extreme cases, like Ellington Darden PhD's 30/30/30 protocol, it may take up to 60 seconds to complete a single repetition.

Also emphasized when near exhaustion in order to further exhaust the muscle or muscles exercised: doing static holds for periods of time, and negative reps (lowering the weight). Some believe this will stimulate further growth and strength because muscles are weakest in positive/contracting movements (sometimes referred to as first-stage failure of a muscle). Although you may not be able to lift a weight for another rep you will almost certainly be able to hold it statically for a further period (second stage of failure) and finally lower a weight at a slow controlled speed (third stage of failure). Until all three (lifting, holding and lowering) parts of an exercise can no longer be completed in a controlled manner, a muscle cannot be considered thoroughly exhausted/exercised.

== Antecedents and Controversies ==
A large number of skeptics dispute the methods and results claimed by HIT advocates. Some of the criticism asserts that HIT violates much conventional "wisdom" in weight training. By always using a weight that one can lift 8-12 times, using 4 second negative reps, and so on, it has flown in the face of the exercise establishment.

There exists also an issue related to the development of HIT and its originality. Near the close of the 19th century, a medical doctor by the name of Gustav Zander developed a complete set of machines and a workout method remarkably close to that promoted by inventor and HIT enthusiast Arthur Jones in the early 1970s. Jones acknowledged Zander stating:

So, in attempts to improve my exercise results, I designed and built a total of about twenty very sophisticated exercise machines, then believing that these were the first exercise machines ever built by anybody. But many years later, I learned that a doctor named Gustav Zander had designed and built a number of exercise machines in Europe nearly a hundred years before I built my first one; I did not copy Zander's work and learned nothing from him, was not even aware of his work until long after I had made the same discoveries that he had made. But if I had known about, and understood, Zander's work, it would have saved me a lot of time and a rather large fortune in money, because the man was a genius; his only problem was that he lived about a century ahead of his time, at a time when very few people cared about exercise and even fewer knew anything about it.

Regardless of who originally developed the systems (and machines) it is clear that through Arthur Jones and his company and a crew of HIT advocates, the principles and concepts of HIT became popularized.

== HIT and other training routines ==
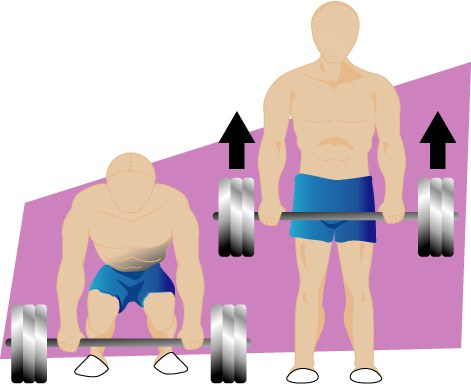
A deadlift

HIT workouts usually include one set of one or two exercises per muscle group, performed to the point of momentary muscle failure. The recommended repetition ranges vary, with most being from as low as 3-5 to as high as 15-20. Lower repetition ranges are often recommended for upper body exercises, while higher repetition ranges are often recommended for the lower body, lower back, abs, and neck.

The recommended repetition speeds are often relatively slow, but not always Super Slow. Nautilus inventor Arthur Jones originally recommended a 2/1/4 cadence; a two-second positive movement, a one-second hold at the end point, and a four-second negative. Later, Jones, Mike Mentzer, and others would recommend performing the positive more slowly, reducing the cadence to 4/1/4 or 4/2/4. Some HIT methods involve even slower repetition cadences, like Ken Hutchins' SuperSlow, with a ten-second positive, ten-second negative, and a two to three-second hold at the end point on some compound pulling and simple movements, but not compound pushing movements, and Ellington Darden PhD's 30/30/30 method, consisting of a 30-second negative, a 30-second positive, and another 30 second negative.

HIT stresses intensity over repetition. Many weightlifters will use a HIT routine to help break a 'plateau' - meaning they will use HIT temporarily when another routine stops giving desired results. Some HIT trainees will use HIT exclusively as well - Arthur Jones believed HIT was all that was required.

Different strength training authors from Ellington Darden and Mike Mentzer to Dorian Yates and Gordon LaVelle have called their system HIT, with each individual having credited Arthur Jones for the formulation of its basic tenet principles. However, there has never been a clear and consistent guideline on how to utilize HIT. Darden advocated full body routines, while Yates recommended to split the workouts into four different sessions a week. Mentzer believed that no more than one set to muscular failure per body part was all that was required, yet Yates and LaVelle believed that more than one exercise per body part is necessary to get complete development as a bodybuilder.

== Rest-pause ==
A former Mr. Universe, the late Mike Mentzer achieved his lifetime best condition from performing rest-pause, an old system of lifting involving single-rep maxima interspersed with brief (10 second) rest periods. Rest-pause has the advantages of old-school power training while also allowing for enough overall reps to be performed for hypertrophy and cardiovascular exercise purposes.

== Notable HIT bodybuilders ==
- Mark Dugdale
- Mike Mentzer
- Ray Mentzer
- Clarence Bass
- Casey Viator
- Dorian Yates
- Anibal Lopez
- Aaron Baker
- Tom Platz

== See also ==
- Anaerobic exercise
- Body for Life
- High-intensity interval training
- Stuart McRobert
- Super slow
