= Barry Sanders =

American football player (born 1968)

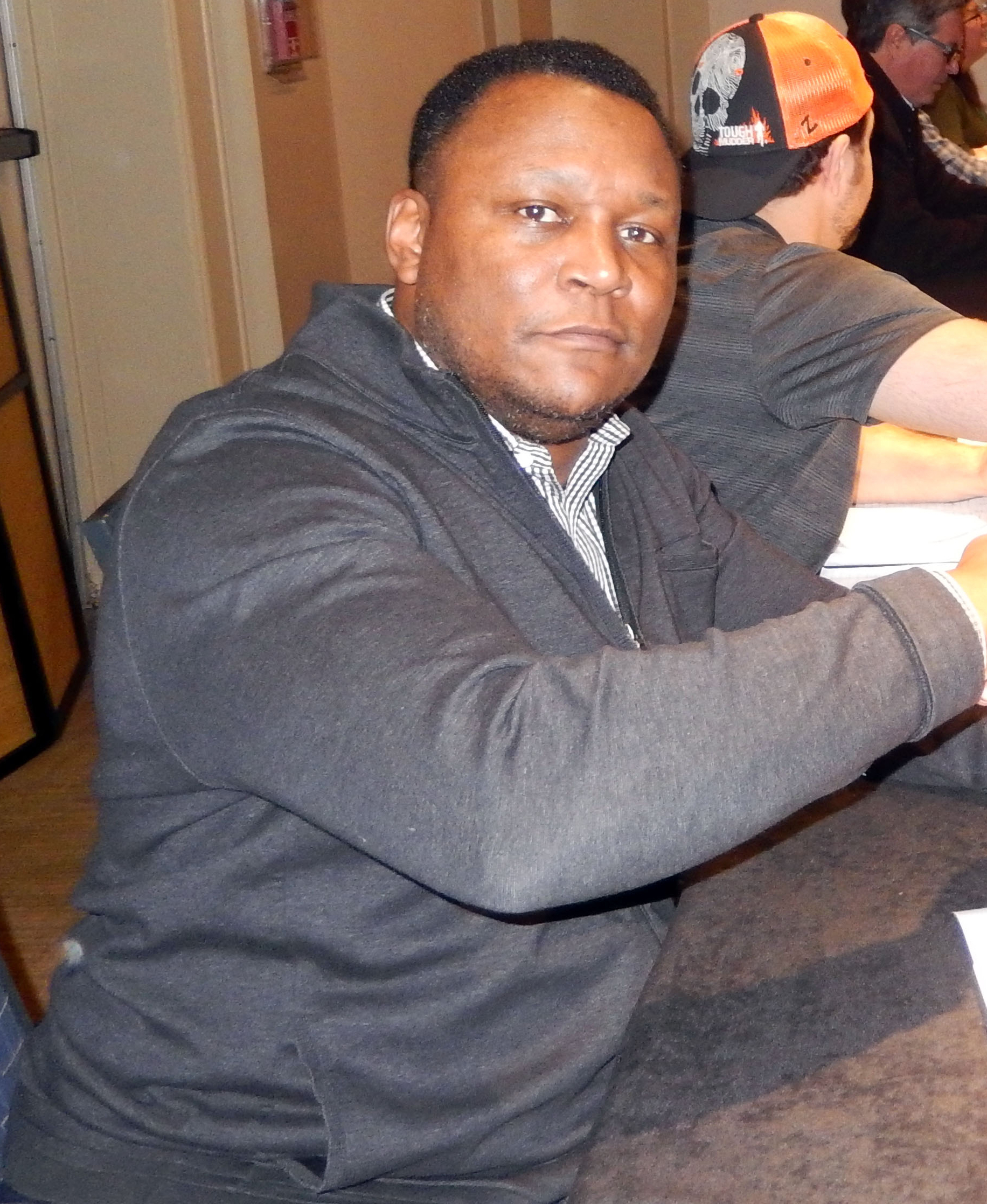
- Sanders in 2019

No. 20
- Position: Running back

Personal information
- Born: July 16, 1968 (age 58); Wichita, Kansas, U.S.
- Listed height: 5 ft 8 in (1.73 m)
- Listed weight: 203 lb (92 kg)

Career information
- High school: Wichita North
- College: Oklahoma State (1986–1988)
- NFL draft: 1989: 1st round, 3rd overall pick

Career history
- Detroit Lions (1989–1998)

Awards and highlights
- NFL Most Valuable Player (1997) (Note: Co-winner with Brett Favre); 2× NFL Offensive Player of the Year (1994, 1997); NFL Offensive Rookie of the Year (1989); 6× First-team All-Pro (1989–1991, 1994, 1995, 1997); 4× Second-team All-Pro (1992, 1993, 1996, 1998); 10× Pro Bowl (1989–1998); 4× NFL rushing yards leader (1990, 1994, 1996, 1997); NFL rushing touchdowns leader (1991); NFL 1990s All-Decade Team; NFL 100th Anniversary All-Time Team; 2× Bert Bell Award (1991, 1997); Pride of the Lions; Detroit Lions 75th Anniversary Team; Detroit Lions All-Time Team; Detroit Lions No. 20 retired; Heisman Trophy (1988); Unanimous All-American (1988); Second-team All-American (1987); First-team AP All-Time All-American (2025); Oklahoma State Cowboys No. 21 retired; NCAA (FBS) records: Rushing yards in a season: 2,628 (Note: Sanders' 1988 Holiday Bowl stats are not included in the official NCAA record book. If they were, his total would be 2,850.) (1988); Rushing touchdowns in a season: 37 (Note: Sanders' 1988 Holiday Bowl stats are not included in the official NCAA record book. If they were, his total would be 42.) (1988); 300-yard rushing games in a season: 4 (1988)

Career NFL statistics
- Rushing yards: 15,269
- Rushing average: 5
- Rushing touchdowns: 99
- Receptions: 352
- Receiving yards: 2,921
- Receiving touchdowns: 10
- Stats at Pro Football Reference
- Pro Football Hall of Fame
- College Football Hall of Fame

Barry David Sanders (born July 16, 1968) is an American former professional football running back who played for the Detroit Lions of the National Football League (NFL) for 10 seasons. Sanders led the league in rushing yards four times and in rushing touchdowns once. Standing at 5 ft. 8 in. tall and weighing 203 lbs., he established himself as one of the most elusive runners in the history of the NFL with his quickness and agility. Sanders is widely considered to be one of the greatest running backs of all time. He played college football for the Oklahoma State Cowboys.

As a junior in 1988, Sanders compiled what is widely considered one of the greatest individual seasons by a running back in college football history, rushing for a record 2,628 yards and 37 touchdowns, in 11 games. He was awarded the Heisman Trophy, and was unanimously recognized as an All-American. Sports Illustrated named his 1988 season as the third-most impressive college sports feat of all time, behind Jesse Owens setting four world records in a single hour, and Cael Sanderson's perfect wrestling record of 159–0, winning four consecutive national titles.

Sanders was selected by the Lions in the 1989 NFL draft, and had an immediate impact in his rookie season, winning the NFL Offensive Rookie of the Year award. In 1991, Sanders helped lead the Lions to their first postseason win since 1958. In 1994, Sanders was awarded the NFL Offensive Player of the Year Award (OPOY). In 1997, he rushed for 2,053 yards in the regular season and was co-awarded the NFL Most Valuable Player Award (shared with Green Bay quarterback Brett Favre), alongside his second NFL Offensive Player of the Year Award. While still performing at a high level, Sanders unexpectedly retired from professional football in 1999, at the age of 31, and 1,457 yards short of breaking the NFL's then all-time rushing record held by Walter Payton.

Sanders cited the Lions' front office and declining team production as reasons for his early retirement. He finished his career with 15,269 rushing yards (fourth all-time), and 99 rushing touchdowns (tenth all-time); in each of his ten seasons he was selected to a Pro Bowl and All-Pro team. The Lions retired Sanders' No. 20 jersey on November 25, 2004, and he was inducted into the Pro Football Hall of Fame three months prior. A year later, Sanders was inducted into the Oklahoma Sports Hall of Fame with former college teammate Thurman Thomas.

In 2007, he was ranked by NFL Networks' NFL Top 10 series as the most elusive runner in NFL history, and was placed No. 1 on the list of the greatest players never to play in a Super Bowl. He is considered by many as one of the greatest running backs in NFL history. Bleacher Report ranked Sanders No. 1 on their list of greatest running backs in NFL history. He averaged 1,527 rushing yards per season and just under 100 rushing yards per game (99.8).

== Early life ==
Sanders was born on July 16, 1968, in Wichita, Kansas, the seventh of eleven children to William and Shirley Sanders. His father worked as a roofer and carpenter, while his mother worked as a homemaker for the Sanders family. Sanders and two of his brothers worked as roofers' assistants to his father. As a child, Sanders was known for having an appetite, being able to eat an entire loaf of bread in one sitting. He would often listen to regional college sports games that his father would play on TV. Mitch Albom of the Detroit Free Press wrote: "All day they would labor, with the hammers, with the tar, sweating in the hot summer sun. You did not complain in the Sanders family. Not unless you wanted a good whupping."

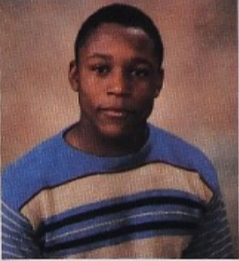
Sanders as a high school senior in 1986

Sanders played football at Wichita North High School. Before this, he enjoyed playing youth football and basketball. Although Barry dreamed of playing running back, he played only defensive back for most of his high school career. Sanders was labeled as an undersized back and wasn't a starter at tailback as a junior due to future Chicago Bears draft pick and older brother Byron Sanders running the rock. When Byron graduated and left for Northwestern University on a football scholarship, Sanders was expected to start at tailback in his senior year—but instead was started at wingback—a variant of the wide receiver position. His head coach at the time perceived that his small stature would be a liability and that he "lacked contact courage." Besides taking part in football, he played basketball as a guard. Table-tennis and baseball were also sports that Sanders took part in. During this period—according to writer Samuel Crompton—the Sanders family was impoverished and had to "scrimp and save to get by".

Sanders did not become the starting running back until the fourth game of his senior year, when the original player was suspended for disciplinary reasons; he rushed for 274 yards and four touchdowns in that game. He rushed for 1,417 yards on 139 rushing attempts, averaging 10.2 yards per rushing attempt, and scored 17 touchdowns through his seven-game senior season. In the last game of the season, Wichita North's head coach, Dale Burkholder, offered Sanders more playing time in order to gain enough rushing yards to reach the state rushing title, but Sanders declined, saying it was "not important." For his season, Sanders earned all-state honors, and was named an Honorable Mention All-American. Although he was viewed as a stellar athlete, because of his short stature Sanders received scholarship offers from only Wichita State University, Iowa State University, University of Tulsa, and Oklahoma State University; he accepted the offer from Oklahoma State.

Sanders later said that his choice to play at Oklahoma State caused a conflict between him and his father. When Oklahoma State's coach came to his father's house with a letter of intent the day Sanders signed with the team, William was dismayed, saying as the coach walked out the door that his signing was a misguided decision. His father was similarly frustrated because Oklahoma State was a conference rival of the Oklahoma Sooners, whom William was a fan of. A friend of Sanders told him that William said Sanders had chosen to play at Oklahoma State "in order to hide"; Sanders would be the backup of Heisman candidate Thurman Thomas, as opposed to playing at a school where he would be the starting running back. Eventually, his father supported Sanders at Oklahoma State, and attended all of his games when he played.

== College career ==
Sanders enrolled at Oklahoma State University, where he played for the Oklahoma State Cowboys from 1986 to 1988 and wore the No. 21 jersey. During his first two years, he backed up Thomas at running back. In 1986, Sanders played in eight games and rushed for 325 rushing yards on 74 rushing attempts, with two rushing touchdowns. In 1987, he led the nation in yards per kickoff return (31.6), while rushing for 603 yards and scoring nine rushing touchdowns, catching four passes for 58 receiving yards and a touchdown, and scoring two touchdowns from 29 total special teams returns. He was named a second-team College Football All-American as a return specialist. While still a backup to Thomas, he received notable attention from his opponents. Oklahoma Sooners head coach Barry Switzer in particular told his players not to injure Thomas, in fear of Sanders starting in his place, telling them: "You won't touch this kid". Sanders was not fond of this as he believed Thomas to be a good teammate. Thomas moved on to the NFL in 1988, which allowed Sanders to become the starter for his junior year in college.

In 1988, in what is considered one of the greatest individual seasons in college football history, Sanders became the first player to open two consecutive seasons with a 100-yard kickoff return. He led the nation by averaging 7.6 yards per attempt and over 200 yards per game, including rushing for over 300 yards in four games. Despite his massive workload of 344 attempts, Sanders was still used as the team's punt and kickoff returner, adding another 516 yards on special teams. He set college football season records with 2,628 yards rushing, 3,250 total all-purpose yards, broken by Christian McCaffrey in 2015, 234 points, broken by Montee Ball in 2011, 37 rushing touchdowns, and 39 total touchdowns, (37 rushing, one kick return, one punt return, tied with Ball).

Sanders had five consecutive 200-yard games, scored at least two touchdowns in all eleven games, and eight times he scored at least three touchdowns. Sanders ran for 222 yards and scored five touchdowns in just three quarters of action in the 1988 Holiday Bowl, a game that is not included in the official NCAA season statistics. When added to his original rushing total, Sanders recorded 2,850 rushing yards from a workload of 373 attempts, 3,472 all-purpose yards, 264 points, 42 rushing touchdowns, and 44 total touchdowns.

Sanders learned of his Heisman Trophy win while he was with the team in Tokyo, Japan preparing to face Texas Tech in the Coca-Cola Classic. He accepted the award via satellite having garnered 559 first-place votes for 1,878 points. He was the eighth non-college senior to attain the trophy, and was selected as a unanimous All-American. Nevertheless, he believed Rodney Peete should have won the award. Along with his Heisman Trophy, Sanders was awarded the Maxwell Award, the Walter Camp Award, and named the Big Eight Offensive Player of the Year. Sanders initially announced that he was not going to enter the NFL draft, but after receiving pressure from his father, made his entrance into the draft.

== Professional career ==
Pre-draft measurables
Height	Weight	40-yard dash
5 ft 7 5/8 in (1.72 m)	203 lb (92 kg)	4.37 s
All values from Pro Day

=== Detroit Lions (1989–1998) ===
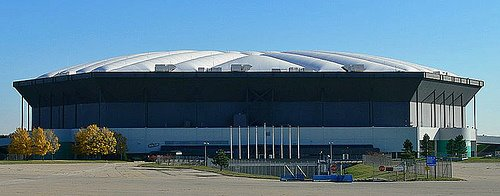
With the Detroit Lions from 1989 to 1998, Sanders played home games at Pontiac Silverdome.

Sanders, a college junior, was originally ineligible for the NFL draft. However, Oklahoma State had been under investigation by the NCAA for recruiting violations. On the first day of 1989, the NCAA placed the Cowboys on four years' probation. If Sanders had remained as a Cowboy for his senior season, his games would not have been televised live, and he would not be able to play in a bowl game. Due to these circumstances, NFL commissioner Pete Rozelle allowed Sanders to enter the draft. In the next year, the NFL allowed all juniors to participate. During pre-draft measurements, Sanders was measured at 5 ft 8 in tall, and weighed at 203 lbs.

The Detroit Lions drafted Sanders third overall in the 1989 NFL draft, after Troy Aikman and Tony Mandarich, thanks to the endorsement of head coach Wayne Fontes. The Lions competed in the Central Division of the National Football Conference (NFC). Since the completion of the NFL-AFL merger in 1970, the Lions had made the postseason only twice, and had not had a season at or above .500 since their most recent playoff season in 1983. Fontes, who took over the coaching position midway through the previous season, was impressed by Sanders' athletic ability after he lifted 225 lbs (102 kg) for 21 reps. Lions' management considered drafting another "Sanders", cornerback Deion Sanders, but Fontes convinced them to draft Barry instead. Fontes offered Sanders jersey No. 20, which had been worn by former Lions running back Billy Sims; Sims was one of the league's premier running backs in the early 1980s, and Fontes requested he wear the number in tribute to Sims. Sanders had doubts about what his career would have been like if another team selected him, such as the Green Bay Packers, who selected Mandarich at No. 2, later saying: "I don't know what I would've done if I was drafted by Green Bay, I don't know if I would've wanted to play in Green Bay, I don't think I could've handled this weather every day."

Sanders did not participate in the training camp of his rookie season due to a contract dispute. He eventually came to monetary terms with the Lions, signing a deal for five years, $9.5 million, including a $2.1 million signing bonus—ten percent of which ($210,000), he donated to his local church: Paradise Baptist Church. In his first Lions press conference, Sanders prefaced that he wanted to assist in restoring the franchise's reputation in the NFL landscape, stating that he wanted to help "restore the roar in the dome."

==== Early years and postseason win (1989–1991) ====
As a rookie in 1989, Sanders started 13 out of a possible 16 games for the Lions. In his first career professional game against the Phoenix Cardinals on September 10, Sanders ran for 71 yards on nine attempts and scored a rushing touchdown in the 16–13 loss. Against the Chicago Bears, Sanders compiled 126 yards on 18 attempts and a touchdown in the 47–27 loss, but became injured with bruised ribs and a hip pointer that plagued him through the rest of the season. On October 1, Sanders had only one yard on five attempts against the Pittsburgh Steelers in the 23–3 loss. Against the Minnesota Vikings, Sanders had 23 attempts for 99 yards in the 24–17 loss. After the game, Vikings head coach Jerry Burns asked game officials to check if Sanders had applied silicone to himself; Burns believed this was why his players had difficulty tackling him; no illegal substance was ever found. On December 24, the final game of the season, he had 158 yards on 20 attempts to go along with three touchdowns against the Atlanta Falcons. During the game, the Lions installed a special phone line in one of the press boxes to monitor Christian Okoye, a running back for the Kansas City Chiefs who, at the time, was tied with Sanders for the league rushing title. When Okoye's game ended, Sanders trailed Okoye by only ten yards. Fontes offered Sanders the chance to return to the Lions' game to gain enough yards to pass Okoye, after Sanders was pulled from the game when the score was in the Lions' favor. Yet Sanders declined to return to the game, letting Okoye keep the rushing title. Sanders finished the season totaling 1,470 rushing yards off of 280 attempts and 14 touchdowns. His rushing total was both a rookie franchise record, and a franchise record for any running back in Lions history (both records held previously by Billy Sims). Sanders was awarded the NFL Offensive Rookie of the Year Award, and named to the PFWA All-Rookie Team. He was also selected to the Pro Bowl and was named a first-team All-Pro by the Associated Press (AP). The Lions struggled that season, posting a 7–9 record and failing to make the postseason, despite winning five straight games to end the year.

On September 9, 1990, against the Tampa Bay Buccaneers, Sanders had 79 yards from 14 rushing attempts and a goal-line touchdown in the 38–21 loss in the Lions' regular season opener. Against the Green Bay Packers on September 30, Sanders had 20 attempts for 94 yards in the 24–21 loss in week 4. Sanders had 16 attempts for 90 yards and a touchdown, coupled with five receptions for 135 yards receiving and a 47-yard receiving touchdown against the Kansas City Chiefs in the 43–24 loss in week 6. On November 4, playing against the Washington Redskins, Sanders had 11 rushes for 104 yards and a touchdown, in a game where the Lions surrendered a 21-point lead to lose 38–41. On December 10 against the Los Angeles Raiders, Sanders was credited with a season-high 176 yards from 25 attempts and two touchdowns in the 38–31 loss. He earned his first NFC Offensive Player of the Week honor for his game against the Raiders. On December 22 against the Packers, Sanders had 19 attempts for 133 yards and a touchdown in the 24–17 victory. Sanders had a productive year, finishing the year first in the NFL in rushing yards, with 1,304, becoming the first Lions running back to lead the league in rushing yards since Byron White in 1940. He ranked third in rushing touchdowns (13), and sixth in both attempts (255), and yards per attempt (5.1). As a result, Sanders was selected to his second Pro Bowl and was again named an AP first-team All-Pro. The Lions finished the year with a 6–10 record and missed the postseason for the seventh consecutive season.

On September 1, 1991, Sanders was inactive for the Lions' 45–0 shutout loss against the Washington Redskins, due to having sore ribs before the opening kickoff. The loss was the franchise's worst in over 20 years. To prepare for Sanders's elusiveness, the Los Angeles Rams obtained a chicken for players to chase during practice. While the Rams still lost 21-10 on November 17, 1991, the team held Sanders to 2.2 yards per carry. On November 24, 1991, against the Minnesota Vikings, Sanders dominated, with 220 rushing yards on 23 attempts and four touchdowns, a game the Lions won 34–14. Sanders dedicated the win to teammate Mike Utley, who suffered a career-ending spinal cord injury the previous game. In the final game of the regular season against the Buffalo Bills, Sanders had 26 attempts for 108 yards and a touchdown, but fumbled in Lions territory, allowing the Bills to tie the game; the Lions would still be victorious, ending 17–14 in overtime. Sanders finished the regular season with 1,548 rushing yards from a workload of 342 attempts. He led the league in rushing touchdowns, with a career-high 16. Subsequently, he was selected to the Pro Bowl and AP first-team All-Pro team and awarded the Bert Bell Award. The 1991 season was the most successful season Sanders achieved as an NFL player. With a 12–4 record, the Lions clinched the NFC Central and made the postseason for the first time since 1983, with Fontes being awarded that year's National Football League Coach of the Year Award. At the time, the 12 wins were the most in a season by the Lions franchise in its history, later surpassed by the 2024 team. Having the No. 2 seed in the NFC, the Lions skipped the Wild Card Round and advanced to the Divisional Round, where they faced the Dallas Cowboys. Sanders helped lead the Lions to their first postseason victory since the team won the 1957 NFL Championship Game. In the game, Sanders was held to only 22 yards rushing before he broke away for a 47-yard touchdown run, in which he broke several tackles to close out the 38–6 victory. In the NFC Championship Game, Sanders was held to eleven attempts for 44 yards in the Lions' blowout 41–10 loss to the eventual Super Bowl-winning Redskins. Sanders finished the postseason with 23 attempts for 113 yards and a touchdown. He would never win another playoff game in his career after that season.

==== Mid-career (1992–1994) ====
On September 13, 1992, Sanders had 26 attempts for 66 yards against the Minnesota Vikings. Against the Washington Redskins the following week, Sanders recorded 14 attempts for only 34 yards in the 13–10 loss. On November 22, Sanders compiled 29 attempts for 151 yards and a touchdown against the Cincinnati Bengals. His rushing total against the Bengals brought his career total to 5,202 rushing yards, passing Sims for a new franchise record. Sanders finished his final regular season game with 19 attempts for 104 yards against the San Francisco 49ers. Overall, Sanders was credited with 1,352 rushing yards from a workload of 312 attempts and nine touchdowns; his rushing yards total ranked fourth in the league, and his attempts ranked third. He was selected to the Pro Bowl and named an AP second-team All-Pro for the first time. The Lions regressed from their previous season, posting a 5–11 record for the year, and missed the playoffs after making the conference championship the prior year.

During the 1993 season, Sanders appeared to be well on his way to that year's NFL rushing title; however, on November 25, 1993, against the Chicago Bears, after rushing for 63 yards on 16 attempts, Sanders was forced to leave the game with an injury. The Lions revealed after the game that Sanders had suffered a torn medial collateral ligament (MCL), and would miss three to five weeks. It was subsequently revealed by a physician that Sanders had also torn his posterior cruciate ligament. As a result, Sanders was inactive for the last five games of the regular season. In his final contract year, Sanders and the Lions agreed to a four-year, $17.2-million contract, making him the highest-paid running back in the NFL, and the third-highest-paid player overall, behind John Elway and Steve Young. Starting in only 11 games due to the injury, he finished in the top ten in multiple rushing categories. Sanders was fifth in the league in rushing yards (1,115 rushing yards), ninth in attempts (243), and second in rushing yards per game (101.4 rushing yards per game); with a career-low three rushing touchdowns. He was named to the Pro Bowl and an AP second-team All-Pro. The Lions finished the regular season with a 10–6 record, clinching the NFC Central and a postseason berth. The Lions faced their division rival Green Bay Packers in the Wild Card Round. After being cleared for the game, Sanders recorded 27 attempts for 169 yards, the best statistical postseason game of his career, but the Lions lost 28–24.

“We’re learning little by little, the hard way, that when Barry Sanders is not having the day you expect him to have, it’s hard for this team to win.”

— Wayne Fontes, Lions' head coach, following the 1994 NFC Wild Card Round loss

On September 11, 1994, Sanders struggled, as he had 12 attempts for only 16 yards in a 10–3 loss against the Minnesota Vikings. Against the Dallas Cowboys the following week, Sanders improved with a career-high 40 attempts for 194 yards. For his performance, he was named the NFC Offensive Player of The Week. On September 25, 1994, against the New England Patriots, Sanders recorded 18 attempts for 131 yards and two touchdowns. During the game, Sanders had one of the most memorable runs of his career. While rushing 39 yards for a touchdown, Sanders juked and spun his way to the end zone, causing Patriots safety Harlon Barnett to spin around trying to tackle Sanders. Barnett later spoke of the moment: "I'm not embarrassed about what happened. I thought I did pretty good. I got in front of him twice", Barnett then added, "I just didn't stay there." Against the Tampa Bay Buccaneers, in a 14–9 win, Sanders had arguably the best statistical game of his career, compiling a career-high 237 rushing yards (franchise record), off of 26 attempts; setting the record for most rushing yards in a single game without scoring a touchdown. Sanders entered the final game of the season within striking distance of 2,000 yards rushing, but finished the loss to the Miami Dolphins with only 12 carries for 52 yards. Nonetheless, Sanders finished first in the league in rushing yards, recording 331 attempts for 1,883 yards rushing and scoring seven touchdowns. His single-season rushing total was fourth in NFL history up to that point. He totaled 2,166 yards from scrimmage, which, at the time, was the seventh-most ever in a season. As a result of his season, he was selected to the Pro Bowl and named an AP first-team All-Pro after the regular season. Sanders was named the NFL Offensive Player of the Year (OPOTY) for the 1994 season and finished second in NFL Most Valuable Player voting behind Steve Young. The Lions finished the year with a 9–7 record and made the postseason with a wild card spot. The Lions faced the Green Bay Packers again in the Wild Card Round, after being defeated by them the previous season. On December 31, the Lions lost the game 16–12, with Sanders recording what is viewed as the worst game of his career, having 13 attempts for -1 rushing yards. Of his 13 attempts, six went for negative yardage, and the Lions as a team were held to only -4 rushing yards in the game.

==== Playoff disappointments and MVP season (1995–1998) ====
The 1995 season began against the Pittsburgh Steelers; Sanders recorded 21 rushing attempts for 108 yards. On September 25 against the San Francisco 49ers, Sanders had a down game, recording 17 attempts for only 24 yards. Against the Cleveland Browns, Sanders improved with 157 yards from 18 attempts and three touchdowns, including a 75-yard touchdown run, in a 38–20 victory. Sanders finished with 314 attempts for 1,500 yards and 11 touchdowns. For his season, Sanders was selected to the Pro Bowl and named an AP first-team All-Pro. The Lions posted a 10–6 record and made the postseason with a wild card spot, where they faced the Philadelphia Eagles in the Wild Card Round. Sanders had ten attempts for 40 yards as the Lions' rushing game was stuffed by the Eagles' defense. The Lions were likewise overwhelmed by the Eagles' offense and faced a 44-point deficit in the third quarter 51–7, eventually losing the game 58–37; despite teammate Lomas Brown stating before the game that a Lions victory was "guaranteed". At the time, this was the highest-scoring postseason game in NFL history, with 95 points scored. This record was bested by one point in a 51–45 victory by the Arizona Cardinals over the Green Bay Packers in 2009.

In 1996, during the first game of the season against the Minnesota Vikings, Sanders recorded 24 rushing attempts for 163 rushing yards. Against the Oakland Raiders, Sanders had nine attempts for only 36 yards. On November 3 against the Green Bay Packers, Sanders had 20 attempts for 152 yards and a touchdown. Against the Seattle Seahawks on November 17, Sanders had 16 attempts for 134 yards and a touchdown. Against the Chicago Bears the following week, Sanders had 21 attempts for 107 yards and a touchdown. Sanders had 20 attempts for 134 yards and a touchdown against the Vikings, but a missed two-point conversion attempt after his touchdown resulted in the Lions losing 22–24. In the final game of the season, he recorded 28 attempts for 175 yards against the San Francisco 49ers. Overall, Sanders finished the regular season first in the league in rushing yards with 1,553 rushing yards from 307 attempts. He scored 11 rushing touchdowns, and had 97.1 rushing yards per game, which was first in the league. At this point in his career, Sanders had 11,725 career rushing yards, seventh all-time, and ranked eighth all-time in career rushing touchdowns, with 84. The Lions regressed, posting a 5–11 record, and failed to make the postseason after three straight playoff seasons from 1993 to 1995; though Sanders still made the Pro Bowl and was named an AP second-team All-Pro.

Before the start of the 1997 season, Fontes was fired after nine seasons coaching the Lions, and replaced by Bobby Ross; Sanders was saddened by Fontes' firing, believing he deserved another chance at coaching the team. On September 7 against the Tampa Bay Buccaneers, Sanders struggled on the ground, having 10 attempts for only 20 yards, but recorded 102 receiving yards and a touchdown. On October 12, Sanders dominated with 215 yards from 24 attempts and two touchdowns against the Buccaneers, passing Jim Brown to be the fourth-ranked career rushing leader in NFL history, with 12,513 career rushing yards; he also caught a seven-yard touchdown pass. Against the Indianapolis Colts, Sanders had another stellar performance, compiling 24 attempts for 216 yards and two touchdowns (including one of 80 yards). With the win, Sanders became the first running back with ten consecutive games with 100 yards rushing in a season, and became the first running back to have three touchdowns of 80+ yards in a season. Against the Chicago Bears, Sanders had 19 attempts for 167 yards and three touchdowns, passing Eric Dickerson to become the second-ranked rusher for career yards behind Walter Payton On December 21, 1997, Sanders entered the season finale against the New York Jets needing at least 131 rushing yards to reach 2,000 for the season; both teams needed a win to clinch a playoff berth. Sanders reached the 2,000 mark on a two-yard run; finishing the game with 23 attempts for 184 yards and a touchdown; helping the Lions edge the Jets 13–10. Sanders had a season that is considered among the greatest ever by a running back. He recorded 2,053 rushing yards, which was first in the league that season, from 335 attempts and 11 touchdowns, becoming just the third running back in history to reach 2,000 rushing yards in a season. For his accomplishments, he credited his offensive linemen, stating: "Without them, I wouldn't have run far at all." Sanders rushed for 100+ yards in the season's final 14 games, an NFL record. With 2,358 total scrimmage yards, he broke the single-season record for scrimmage yards that was held by Marcus Allen; his record would be surpassed two seasons later by Marshall Faulk, who in turn was bested by Chris Johnson in 2009. Sanders was named to the Pro Bowl and AP first-team All-Pro, and awarded the Bert Bell Award. Sanders was also awarded his second NFL Offensive Player of the Year Award, and the NFL Most Valuable Player (MVP) (co-won with Brett Favre). The Lions posted a 9–7 record and clinched a wild card spot as the No. 5 seed in the NFC. Sanders and the Lions faced the Buccaneers, who were playing their first home postseason game since 1979. Sanders had 18 attempts for 65 yards as the Lions lost 20–10 in the Wild Card Round, after starting quarterback Scott Mitchell left the game with an injury in the third quarter.

On September 13, 1998, against the Cincinnati Bengals, Sanders recorded 185 rushing yards from 26 rushing attempts with three touchdowns in the 34–28 loss in week 2. Sanders had 22 attempts for 69 yards in a 6–29 loss against the Minnesota Vikings. On November 26, 1998, against the Pittsburgh Steelers, Sanders had a down game, with 20 attempts for only 33 rushing yards; the Lions were still victorious 19–16 in overtime. Against the Jacksonville Jaguars, Sanders had 18 attempts for 102 yards. In Sanders' final game of his career, on December 27, 1998, he had 19 attempts for 41 yards in a 19–10 loss against the Baltimore Ravens. Sanders capped off his final season with 1,491 rushing yards (fourth in the league), from a career-high 343 attempts (fifth in the league), and four touchdowns. He was nine yards short of completing five straight seasons with at least 1,500 rushing yards. He was selected to his tenth Pro Bowl, and named an AP second-team All-Pro. The Lions struggled despite Sanders' performances, going 5–11, and failing to make the playoffs.

== Retirement ==
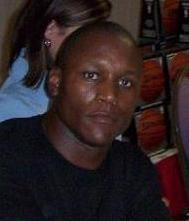
Sanders in 2005

On July 27, 1999, Sanders announced his retirement from pro football, the day before Lions training camp was set to start. His retirement was made public by faxing a letter to The Wichita Eagle, his hometown newspaper. In the letter, Sanders wrote:

"Shortly after the end of last season, I felt that I probably would not return for the 1999–2000 season. I also felt that I should take as much time as possible to sort through my feelings and make sure that my feelings were back with conviction. Today, I officially declare my departure from the NFL."

He left football healthy, having gained 15,269 rushing yards (the most ever by any NFL player in a 10-year span). He retired within 1,457 rushing yards of Walter Payton's career rushing mark of 16,726 yards. It has been speculated that Sanders would have surpassed the record if he had not retired early, a view held by Emmitt Smith, the eventual holder of the record. His father praised him for his decision, saying that it "took guts." Sanders would later describe his hesitance to retire, and that he waited "till the last minute." His retirement voided $20.9 million in collective salary and bonuses, along with millions of dollars in endorsements.

Sanders' retirement came somewhat unexpectedly and was a matter of controversy. Two years earlier, Sanders had renewed his contract with the Lions for $34.56 million over six years with an $11 million signing bonus. The Lions demanded that he return $7.37 million of the bonus. Sanders' agents refused, and the Lions filed a grievance with the NFL. On February 15, 2000, an arbitrator ruled that Sanders had to immediately repay $1,833,000 (one sixth of the bonus), with three sixths of the bonus to be repaid over each of the three years Sanders had left on the contract provided he stayed retired. Before the ruling, Sanders offered to pay back the entire bonus in return for him being traded to another team or his release.

It was thought by some that Lions head coach Bobby Ross himself may have actually been the reason for Sanders' early retirement, but in his autobiography Barry Sanders: Now You See Him, Sanders praised Ross as a head coach who had nothing directly to do with his retirement. It was more his frustration with the management and direction of the Lions and the resulting lack of success that contributed to his retirement, as Sanders revealed in his autobiography: "My retirement letter didn't even hint at my frustration, because I didn't want to take shots at people as I left. ... Management had let quality players slip away. We'd been losing for years. Now we were right back where we were when I arrived." He wrote: "A goal that I still hadn't realized was playing in the Super Bowl, and all of the statistical achievements didn't put the team any closer to playing in the big game." Sanders has since patched things up with the Lions, rejoining the organization in a paid role as a team ambassador in 2017, and they dedicated a bronze statue to him outside Ford Field in September 2023.

On November 21, 2023, Bye Bye Barry, a documentary film about his decision to retire while approaching the all-time rushing record, was released on Prime Video.

== Career statistics ==
=== NFL ===
Legend
	NFL MVP and OPOTY
	NFL Offensive Player of the Year
	Led the league
**Bold**	Career-high

==== Regular season ====
Year	Team	Games		Rushing							Receiving						Fumbles	
Year	Team	GP	GS	Att	Yds	Avg	Y/G	Lng	TD	FD	Rec	Yds	Avg	Lng	TD	FD	Fum	Lost
1989	DET	15	13	280	1,470	5.3	98.0	34	14	—	24	282	11.8	46	0	0	**10**	0
1990	DET	16	16	255	1,304	5.1	81.5	45	13	—	36	**480**	**13.3**	47	**3**	0	4	2
1991	DET	15	15	342	1,548	4.5	103.2	69	**16**	—	41	307	7.5	34	1	**18**	5	1
1992	DET	16	16	312	1,352	4.3	84.5	55	9	—	29	225	7.8	48	1	7	6	2
1993	DET	11	11	243	1,115	4.6	101.4	42	3	—	36	205	5.7	17	0	6	4	**3**
1994	DET	16	16	331	1,883	5.7	117.7	**85**	7	76	44	283	6.4	22	1	16	0	0
1995	DET	16	16	314	1,500	4.8	93.8	75	11	72	**48**	398	8.3	40	1	**18**	4	2
1996	DET	16	16	307	1,553	5.1	97.1	54	11	81	24	147	6.1	28	0	5	4	2
1997	DET	16	16	335	**2,053**	**6.1**	**128.3**	82	11	**86**	33	305	9.2	**66**	**3**	11	4	2
1998	DET	16	16	**343**	1,491	4.3	93.2	73	4	65	37	289	7.8	44	0	10	3	1
Career		153	151	3,062	15,269	5.0	99.8	85	99	380	352	2,921	8.3	66	10	91	44	15

==== Postseason ====
Year	Team	Games		Rushing							Receiving						Fumbles	
Year	Team	GP	GS	Att	Yds	Avg	Y/G	Lng	TD	FD	Rec	Yds	Avg	Lng	TD	FD	Fum	Lost
1991	DET	2	2	23	113	4.9	56.5	**47**	**1**	0	**9**	**45**	5.0	10	0	0	0	0
1993	DET	1	1	**27**	**169**	**6.3**	**169.0**	44	0	0	2	0	0	0	0	0	0	0
1994	DET	1	1	13	−1	−0.1	−1.0	7	0	0	3	4	1.3	3	0	0	0	0
1995	DET	1	1	10	40	4.0	40.0	9	0	2	2	19	**9.5**	11	0	1	**1**	**1**
1997	DET	1	1	18	65	3.6	65.0	15	0	3	5	43	8.6	**15**	0	**2**	0	0
Career		6	6	91	386	4.2	64.3	47	1	5	21	111	5.3	15	0	3	1	1

=== College ===
Season	Team	GP	Rushing					Receiving		
Season	Team	GP	Att	Yds	Avg	Y/G	TD	Rec	Yds	TD
1986	Oklahoma State	8	74	325	4.4	40.6	2	0	0	0
1987	Oklahoma State	11	105	603	5.7	54.8	9	4	58	1
1988	Oklahoma State	11	344	2,628	7.6	238.9	37	19	106	0
Total		30	523	3,556	6.8	118.5	48	23	164	1

== Career highlights ==
=== Awards and honors ===
==== NFL ====
- NFL Most Valuable Player Award (1997)
- 2× NFL Offensive Player of the Year Award (1994, 1997)
- 4× NFL rushing champion (1990, 1994, 1996, 1997)
- NFL rushing touchdowns leader (1991)
- 10× Pro Bowl (1989–1998)
- 6× First-team All-Pro (1989–1991, 1994, 1995, 1997)
- 4× Second-team All-Pro (1992, 1993, 1996, 1998)
- PFWA All-Rookie Team (1989)
- 2× Bert Bell Award (1991, 1997)
- SN NFL Player of the Year (1997)
- NFL 1990s All-Decade Team
- NFL 100th Anniversary All-Time Team
- No. 17 on The Top 100: NFL's Greatest Players
- No. 20 retired by the Detroit Lions
- Pride of the Lions

==== College ====
- Heisman Trophy (1988)
- Maxwell Award (1988)
- Walter Camp Award (1988)
- Big Eight Offensive Player of the Year (1988)
- Unanimous All-American (1988)
- Second-team All-American (1987)
- NCAA rushing yards leader (1988)
- NCAA rushing touchdowns leader (1988)
- NCAA scoring leader (1988)
- First-team All-Big Eight (1988)
- AP All-Time All-America college football team
- Oklahoma State Cowboys No. 21 retired
- Oklahoma State Cowboys Ring of Honor

=== Records ===
==== NFL records ====
- Tied with Derrick Henry for most seasons with 1,500 or more yards rushing (5)
- Consecutive games with 100 or more yards rushing (14)
- Games with 100 or more yards rushing in a season (14)
- 150+ yard rushing games (25)
- 150+ scrimmage yard games (46)
- First running back to have two 80+ yard touchdown runs in a game

==== NCAA FBS records ====
Sanders set 34 NCAA Division I FBS records in his college career, and still holds the following records:

- Most rushing yards in a season: 2,628
- Most rushing yards gained in a three, four, and five game span: 937; 1,152; 1,472
- Most rushing touchdowns in a season: 37
- Most 2+ rushing touchdown games in a season: 11
- Most 3+ rushing touchdown games in a season: 8
- Most consecutive games scoring two or more touchdowns: 13 (from November 14, 1987, through 1988)
- Most scrimmage touchdowns in a season: 39 (tied with Ball)
- Most games rushing for 300+ yards in a season and career: 4
- Most all-purpose yards per game in a season: 295.5
- Most rushing yards per game in a season: 238.9

== Legacy ==
Sanders is widely regarded as one of the greatest running backs in the history of the NFL, being ranked No. 1 by Bleacher Report and in the top ten by other media outlets. Sanders was first inducted into the Kansas Sports Hall of Fame in 1998, into the College Football Hall of Fame in 2003 and in that same year inducted into the Michigan Sports Hall of Fame. In 2000, Sanders was included in the NFL 1990s All-Decade Team. In 2019, he was named to the National Football League 100th Anniversary All-Time Team.

When he retired, Sanders was ranked second all-time in career rushing yards with 15,269 rushing yards, sixth all-time in career rushing touchdowns with 99 rushing touchdowns, and second all-time in career rushing attempts with 3,062 attempts. As of 2022, Sanders is still ranked in the top ten in all three statistics. Over his entire career, Sanders averaged 1,527 rushing yards per season, and 99.8 rushing yards per game, the latter stat second to Jim Brown. He never went below 1,000 yards in any of his ten seasons and has the second-most career 1,000-yard rushing seasons, with ten. Sanders was a notable bright spot on a Lions franchise that had endured years of unsuccessful play, helping to lead the team to their first playoff victory in decades. At the same time, Sanders only won one playoff game throughout his ten-year career, with NFL Network's Derrin Horton stating: "Not even Barry Sanders... could pull Detroit out of the playoff snakebit," in reference to the team's postseason failures. The Lions' overall unsuccessful play was noted for possibly being a reason for Sanders' early retirement. His number 20 was retired by the Lions on November 25, 2004, along with Sims and Lem Barney (who wore the same number). Sanders was also honored by the Lions when they inducted him into the Pride of the Lions, the franchise's ring of honor. In 2023, the Lions also immortalized Sanders with an 8-foot bronze statue located outside of Ford Field.

Throughout his career, he achieved Pro Bowl and All-Pro status in all ten of his NFL seasons. Sanders was named first-team All-Pro six times; and named second-team All-Pro four times. Sanders was named NFL Offensive Player of the Year in 1994 and 1997, awarded two Bert Bell Awards, and was named to the 1990s NFL All-Decade team. Both the Pro Football Hall of Fame and Oklahoma Sports Hall of Fame enshrined him on August 8, 2004, and August 21, 2005, respectively. At age 36, Sanders became the second-youngest player to be inducted into the Pro Football Hall of Fame. In 2019, Sanders was named to the NFL 100th Anniversary All-Time Team. In 2007, he was ranked by NFL Network's NFL Top 10 series as the most elusive runner in NFL history, and in 2012 was placed No. 1 on their list of the greatest players to never play in a Super Bowl.

Sanders led the NFL in rushing yards four times (second to Brown), and in rushing touchdowns once in 1994. He co-won the NFL Most Valuable Player Award in 1997 (with Brett Favre) after rushing for 2,053 yards in 16 games, becoming the third running back to surpass 2,000 yards. In the same season, Sanders totaled a record 2,358 yards from scrimmage, later surpassed by both Marshall Faulk and Chris Johnson. By the end of his career, Sanders was known as "one of the game's most electrifying runners", as described by the Pro Football Hall of Fame; this was a view shared by Sports Illustrated, who described him as "running circles around NFL defenses with an electrifying style unlike anything the league has seen." His 1989 season is regarded as one of the best all-time by a rookie running back, ranked No. 3 by NFL analyst Elliot Harrison, and No 4. by ESPN analyst Jeff Merron. In 1999, an ESPN survey of journalists, athletes, and other sports figures ranked Sanders as the 76th greatest North American athlete of the 20th century.

Although he sat behind fellow Pro Football Hall of Fame running back Thurman Thomas on the depth chart for his first two collegiate seasons, Sanders is considered one of the greatest college football players of all time. His Heisman trophy-winning season in 1988, in which he set single-season college football records for most rushing yards gained, touchdowns scored, and total scrimmage yards (among other records), is often considered the greatest individual college football season ever, ranked No. 1 by ESPN and Sporting News. In commemoration of the 150th year of college football, Sanders was honored during halftime at the College Football Playoff National Championship game on January 13, 2020, as the No. 9 player of all time.

In contrast to many of the star players of his era, Sanders was noted for his on-field humility. Despite his flashy playing style, Sanders was rarely seen celebrating after the whistle was blown; instead, he handed the ball to a referee, and was never tempted into celebrating any further. He was recognized for putting his team's success over his stats, as shown when he denied a request from head coach Wayne Fontes to return to play in a game so that he could gain enough rushing yards to become the rushing leader for that season. He disliked speaking to the press, and rarely spoke about his accomplishments publicly. When reflecting on his career, ESPN described Sanders as a "humble superstar."

== Personal life ==
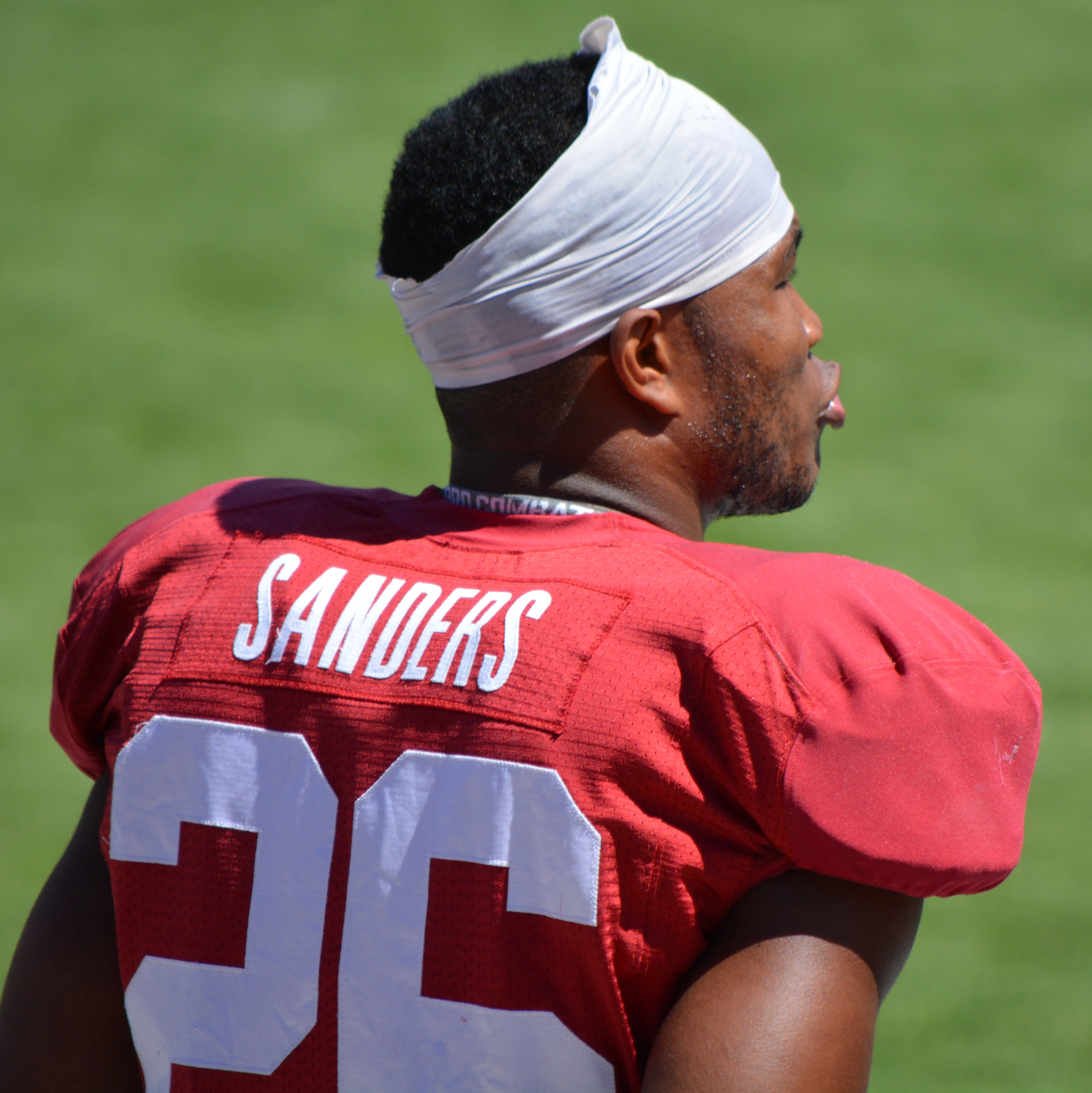
Sanders' eldest son, Barry, playing for the Stanford Cardinal

Sanders is a Christian. He and his wife, Lauren Campbell Sanders, a former news anchor for WDIV in Detroit, filed for divorce in February 2012 after 12 years of marriage. Sanders' brother, Byron, was the starting running back at Northwestern University, and would be selected by the Chicago Bears in the 9th round of the 1989 NFL draft. Byron was cut by the Bears two months after joining the franchise.

Sanders has four sons: Barry J. Sanders, Nick, Nigel, and Noah; the youngest three are from his marriage to Campbell. When the couple divorced, Sanders requested joint custody of them, while Campbell kept their medical coverage. Sanders' oldest son, Barry J. Sanders, played running back at Stanford University from 2012 to 2015, and Oklahoma State University in 2016. From 2022−2026, his son Nick played basketball at Michigan State University. In 2003, Sanders co-wrote his autobiography, Barry Sanders: Now You See Him: His Story In His Own Words, with Mark McCormick. He has reportedly donated to several charities, under the condition that they do not disclose his participation in any of them.

Sanders introduced ESPN's Monday Night Football game between the Chicago Bears and the Lions on October 10, 2011. In April 2013, Sanders made it to the finals of the vote to be on the cover of EA Sports Madden NFL 25, which celebrated the game's 25th anniversary, by beating head coach Ron Rivera in Round One, running back Marcus Allen in Round Two, linebacker Ray Lewis in Round Three, quarterback Joe Montana in the quarter-finals, and wide receiver Jerry Rice in the semi-finals. In the final round, he defeated running back Adrian Peterson to become the next cover athlete, the first player to appear on the cover of Madden NFL Football more than once (he appeared in the background of the Madden NFL 2000 cover).

In December 2024, Sanders opened a new car wash in Madison Heights, Michigan. On Father's Day weekend in 2025, he announced that he had suffered a heart attack the previous summer, and had a three-day hospital stay before being released after treatment. This led him to begin production of a documentary to educate the symptoms of cardiac arrest, especially for former athletes more tempered to ignore instances of pain, like himself.

== See also ==
- List of National Football League rushing yards leaders
- List of National Football League annual rushing touchdowns leaders
- List of National Football League rushing champions
- List of NCAA major college football yearly rushing leaders
- List of NCAA major college football yearly scoring leaders

== Works cited ==
- McCormick, Mark (2003). Barry Sanders: Now You See Him: His Story In His Own Words. Indianapolis: Emmis Books. ISBN 1-57860-139-8.
- Crompton, Samuel Etinde (2008). Barry Sanders. New York: Chelsea House. ISBN 9780791096673.
