= Roy Pinney =

American photographer (1911–2010)

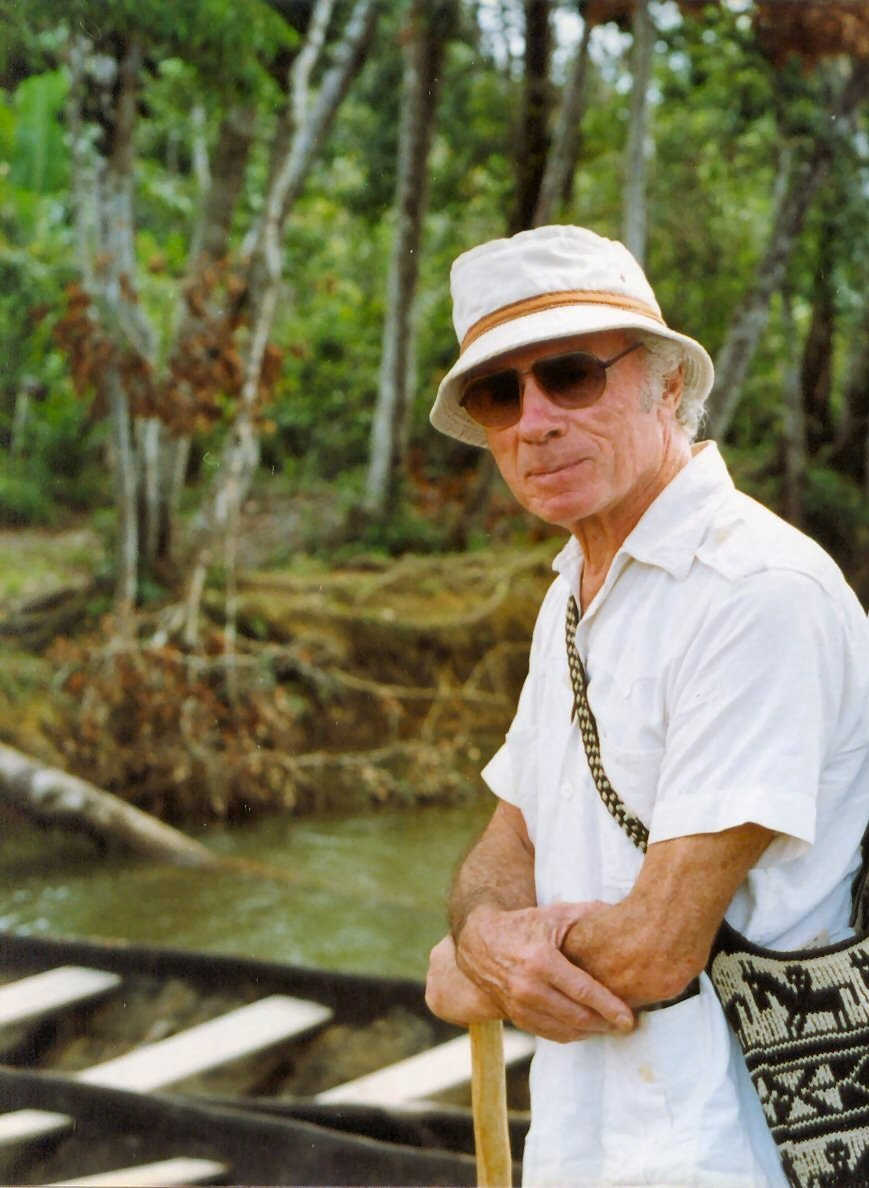
Roy Pinney

Roy Schiffer Pinney (August 13, 1911 – August 9, 2010) was a professional photographer, herpetologist, writer, journalist, war correspondent and pilot.

Pinney was the former president of the New York Herpetological Society and the author of The Snake Book. He was also an ardent spelunker and the author of Cave Exploration. Roy Pinney worked for the New York Daily News (Brooklyn Section, editor Jack Hoins) for 18 years working as photographer and writer, a familiar figure around New York City arriving on assignments on his 1928 Indian chief motorcycle. He later freelanced for Life, Look, Colliers, and Woman's Day and other magazines often going on his assignments in his World War II BT-13 plane. He was a founder and trustee of the ASMP. He was the photographer on more than seventy scientific trips. He was the producer of the American TV series "Secrets of Nature" (1955–59) and the cameraman and director of the Wild Cargo series in 1961. He was the oldest surviving of the 500 war correspondents to cover the D-Day invasion of Normandy before his death in 2010. He lived in Midtown Manhattan in New York City, the city of his birth.

== Family history and name change ==
Pinney was born Pinyehrae Schiffer to Polish immigrant father Max Schiffer and mother Sarah Schiffer on the Lower East Side of Manhattan in 1911. His parents emigrated from Galicia in eastern Europe in the border region between Poland and Ukraine. At the age of 18 he Americanized his conspicuously Polish/Jewish name by altering his first name Pinyehrae into the last name Pinney and adopting the first name Roy in honor of Roy Chapman Andrews.

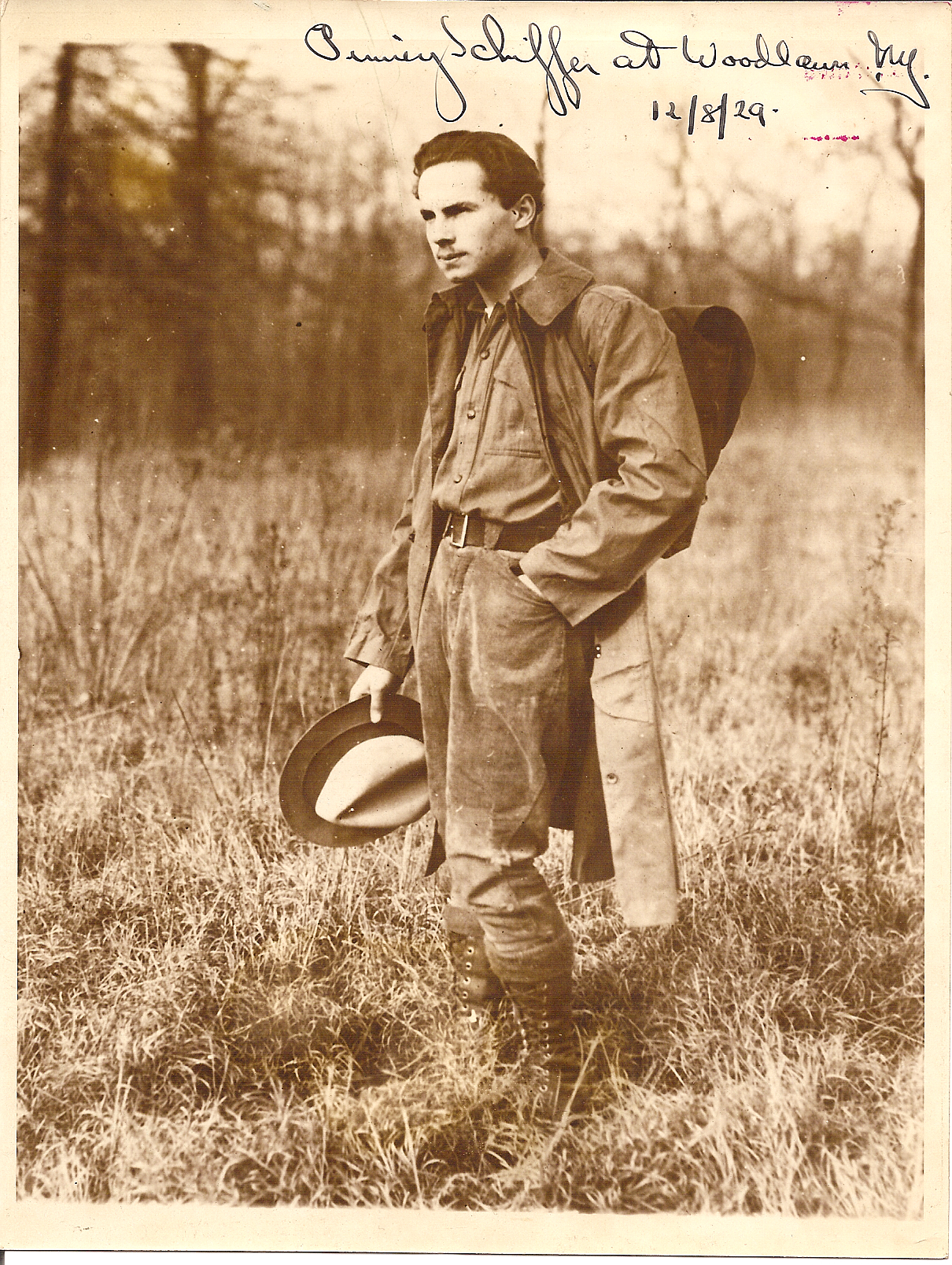
Roy Pinney

== Biography ==
The son of grocers, Pinney was born and raised on the Lower East Side. Pinney caught his first venomous snake, a rattler, at age 12 while attending Boy Scout camp. He was chastised, but it did not take. He attended high school at DeWitt Clinton High School, an all-boys public school at that time on 10th Avenue and 59th Street in New York City with classmates and lifelong friends Bernard Herrmann and Abraham Polonsky.

In 1928 Pinney learned to use a camera and was employed by Underwood & Underwood through March 8, 1929.

Pinney bagged more than 1,000 venomous serpents all over the planet. The American Society for the Prevention of Cruelty to Animals gave him stray snakes in need of homes and he kept the best for himself.

His first love was photography. Pinney was wounded while photographing the Normandy invasion ("just a piece of shrapnel, nothing serious"), and later shot pictures of the Yom Kippur War. He sold his work to Life and Look Magazine when they were the pinnacle. He moved on to shooting advertising photos, "where the big bucks are," he explained.

He changed his life's course through his collaboration with the nature writer Ivan T. Sanderson, who brought a different animal to show off to Dave Garroway, the talk show host, each week. Pinney was Sanderson's producer and cameraman. He went on to work as cameraman for such nature show gurus as Marlin Perkins and Lorne Greene. Pinney wrote 2,000 articles and over 20 books, about everything from tribal cultures to how to survive the atomic bomb. The last was The Snake Book, published in 1981. He made more than 160 expeditions to remote destinations.

A 1971 divorce left him bitter, so he threw away many of his cameras and stopped taking pictures. He once invested his personal savings in a new television series about a 25-year-old zoologist's adventures, shot 39 episodes and couldn't sell it. "She really has a special charisma with animals," he insists to this day.

On August 9, 2010, Pinney died at the age of 98, just four days before his 99th birthday.

Pinney lived in Sanderson's former apartment, as he had since the divorce, surrounded by artifacts from endangered cultures, an undisclosed number of snakes, and 50,000 aging photographs.

== Herpetology ==
Pinney was a world traveling herpetologist who collected venomous and nonvenomous snakes the world over. He was an active member of the New York Herpetological Society, serving as that organization's president for four years ending in 1989.

Throughout his career Pinney developed a reputation as the go-to man for expert information on the care of snakes and other reptiles. During the 1980s and early 1990s the then active duty New York City police officers and now notorious "mafia cops", Louis Eppolito and Stephen Caracappa, routinely gave Roy Pinney the exotic pets they would seize from drug dealers after the arrests they would regularly make. Over the years Louis Eppolito and Stephen Caracappa gave Pinney several pythons, an anaconda and even a live Galapagos tortoise among other exotic animals.

== Photography and films ==
In 1929 at the age of 18 Pinney became a freelance photographer and journalist for the Brooklyn section of the New York Daily News. He was also the camera man for a series of animal TV programs for Marlin Perkins, Ivan Sanderson and Arthur Jones. The program with Marlin Perkins was called Wild Kingdom and the program with Arthur Jones was called Wild Cargo.

Later in his career Pinney owned and operated Photo-Library Inc., a stock photography business with nearly half a million photographs on file. The library included animals, architecture, babies, children, flowers, food, geography, girls, industrial, medical, personalities, romance, scenic views and sports. On its business cards Photo-Library Inc. touted its "100,000 Color Transparencies and 300,000 Black and White stock photographs."

Pinney's portrait of a baby won first prize in a Popular Photography photography competition beating out 46,000 other contestants and winning Pinney a new Packard convertible.

In 1963 Pinney won the first prize for television commercials at the Cannes Film Festival. View the video here on YouTube.

In 2002 a 13.5x10.5 print of Pinney's 1936 photograph of hands "Reading Braille" was displayed in the Guggenheim Museum as part of the Buhl Collection photography exhibition on hands.

In 2007 Pinney's photograph of two swimmers underwater in a pool appeared in a large coffee table book entitled POOLS by Kelly Klein. The book was published by Rizzoli. The ISBN is 0-8478-2918-9

== Author ==
Pinney is the author of 24 books including:

- The Snake Book (1981) (ISBN 0-385-13547-5)
- Pets from Wood, Field and Stream (1969)
- Vanishing Tribes (1968) (ISBN 0-690-85943-0)
- Quest for the Unknown: Explorers of Today (1965)
- Wild Animal Pets (1965)
- Animals of the Bible (1964) (ASIN: B0007DV4UU)
- Careers with a Camera (1964)
- Advertising Photography: A Visual Communication book (1962)
- The Complete Book of Cave Exploration (1962)
- The Golden Book of Nature Crafts (1962)
- How to Survive an Atomic Attack (1961)
- The Golden Book of Wild Animal Pets (1959
- Underwater Archeology
- Slavery: Past and Present
- Animals, Inc.
- Vanishing Wildlife
- Young Israel
- Wild Life in Danger
- Collecting and Photographing your Microzoo

Since their publication all of his books have gone out of print and have not been re-released. Roy Pinney also wrote a number of books that were never published including The Python Book, Our Vanishing Animal Friends, Animals Lost Forever, The Encyclopedia of Snakes, Vanishing Amphibians, and a book on his time as a war correspondent.

== War correspondent ==
In 1944 Pinney became a war correspondent when he covered the D-day invasion of Omaha Beach Normandy, France for Liberty magazine. He went on to cover more than a half dozen wars and conflicts around the world including conflicts in Afghanistan, Guyana, Spanish Morocco, Colombia, the Philippines and South Africa. In 1973 Pinney also photographed and reported on the Yom Kippur War in the Gaza Strip. Among the approximately 500 war correspondents covering the Normandy Invasion Roy Pinney at 98 years old was the oldest survivor. Andy Rooney of 60 Minutes fame was also among the oldest survivors.

At the time of Pinney's death he had written an unpublished book on being a war correspondent which included detailed stories of his travels in World War II Europe.

== Friends and associates ==
Pinney went to elementary school with and was lifelong friends with Bernard Herrmann who scored Citizen Kane, Psycho, and Taxi Driver. He was lifelong friends with Abraham Polonsky. He was also friends with writer Ivan T. Sanderson. Pinney moved into Sanderson's apartment in the Whitby on 45th Street in Manhattan's Hell's Kitchen around the time of Sanderson's death. He was also good friends with billionaire Arthur Jones of Nautilus, Inc. exercise equipment fame. Pinney studied anthropology at Columbia University under Franz Boas. In 1927 Roy competed in a Boy Scout essay contest to accompany Martin and Osa Johnson on one of their wild-life movie-making trips to Africa, but didn't make it. Years later, after Martin Johnson was killed in a plane crash, Osa and Roy became lifelong friends. In 1929 Roy traveled on an expedition to British Guiana with Somerset Maugham. Pinney was friends with the American photographer and model Bunny Yeager. In the book Bunny's Honeys Bunny mentions Pinney in her story of the origin of the phrase "the world's prettiest photographer" that is used to describe her. He was also friends with artist William Ward Beecher and with artist Ugo Mochi who designed his letterhead. Pinney was an early patron of George Nakashima, commissioning 18 pieces of furniture starting in 1947. He was also friends with Jim Fowler and Marlin Perkins of Wild Kingdom fame and filmed many of the episodes. Finally, Pinney was friends with John Steinbeck when Steinbeck lived in New York.
