= Super Slow =

Physical strengthening exercise

Super Slow is a form of strengthening physical exercise (resistance training) popularized by Ken Hutchins. Super Slow is Hutchins' trademarked name for the high intensity training approach advocated by Arthur Jones. It is based on ideas from the 1940s and 1960s called 10/10 "muscle contraction with measured movement" and implemented using fixed weight Nautilus machines. In more recent times, such "Time Under Load" ideas have seen a renaissance with Dr Doug McGuff's Body by Science.

The 10 second lifting, and the 10 second lowering repetition speed of movement was suggested to Ken Hutchins by Dr. Vincent Bocchicchio. Bocchicchio promoted his original idea as being impractical on compound movements such as leg press, chest press, overhead press, and pull downs (chin-ups). However, Hutchins developed a turnaround technique to include those important exercises during Nautilus-funded osteoporosis research at the University of Florida in the early 1980s. In addition, Hutchins improved the resistance curves of the exercise equipment and reduced their friction to further enhance the loading effect upon the muscles. The effect of this approach was further improved by the practice of the exercises in an "ideal" environment wherein the temperature was cool, ventilation was provided, and distractions (audio, smell, visual) were minimized. This clinical environment, in combination with the slow speed and improved mechanics, had never been managed before. SuperSlow instructors are also educated with an emphasis on using precise language in exercise.

A ten/ten protocol was used in the 1940s by body builders and later in the 1960s by powerlifters as a plateau breaker under the name MC/MM or muscle contraction with measured movement. This similar idea was sometimes advocated by Bob Hoffman of the York Barbell Company. None of these earlier approaches incorporated the ideal environment, the consistent turnaround technique, the superior equipment mechanics, nor the adherence to tracking muscular function that SuperSlow encompassed.

The method incorporates very slow repetition speeds as compared to traditional resistance training methods, with emphasis on minimizing acceleration and momentum to reduce the force the body is exposed to during exercise and improve muscular loading.

SuperSlow workouts typically consist of one set of each exercise carried out to complete muscle fatigue. Hutchins recommends performing each set for between 100 and 240 seconds, depending on the exercise and the subject's competence. A frequency of twice weekly is recommended for most trainees, with even less frequency for more advanced trainees. A workout should last no longer than 30 minutes and be performed to the exclusion of all other intense activity for maximum progress. In recent years, Hutchins has continued to refine methods and expand publications to include additional training methodology and exercise history.

Some research indicates that Super Slow produces superior results compared to traditional methods in as little as 10 weeks.

Slow repetitions may be particularly beneficial to trainees working around injuries or conditions requiring extra caution and may be useful for practicing proper form when learning new exercises. Personal trainers who have abandoned Super Slow for general use may still use it as a method for teaching new exercises or evaluating clients' exercise form.

== See also ==
- Weight training
- Resistance training
- High intensity training
