= Ken Hutchins =

American inventor

- Writing career
- Genre: Non-fiction
- Subject: Sports

Ken Hutchins (born 20th century) is an American inventor who defined and popularized the Super Slow form of resistance training exercise, and developed methodology, trainer certifications, and exercise equipment to specifically support the techniques.

== Career and activities ==
Hutchins established his own exercise practice, continuing to develop the Super Slow techniques and eventually publishing several editions of a technical manual for the application of Super Slow exercise.

The New York Times Magazine included Super Slow and Hutchins in the 2001 edition of its annual Year in Ideas series.

In 2009, Hutchins and his wife joined Renaissance Exercise, continuing to produce evolutionary designs for exercise equipment. Expanded exercise technique and protocol descriptions were published in 2011.
