= Mike Mentzer =

American bodybuilder (1951–2001)

- Professional bodybuilder

Personal info
- Full name: Michael John Mentzer
- Born: November 15, 1951; Philadelphia, Pennsylvania, U.S.
- Died: June 10, 2001 (aged 49); Rolling Hills, California, U.S.

Best statistics
- Height: 5 ft 8 in (1.73 m)
- Weight: 225 lb (102 kg)

Professional (Pro) career
- Pro-debut: IFBB Southern Pro Cup; 1979
- Best win: IFBB Mr. Olympia heavyweight champion; 1979
- Predecessor: Robby Robinson

Michael John Mentzer (November 15, 1951 – June 10, 2001) was an American IFBB professional bodybuilder, Objectivist philosopher, businessman, and author. Born in Philadelphia, Pennsylvania, Mentzer started bodybuilding when he was eleven years old. He won several amateur bodybuilding competitions before turning professional in 1979, including the 1976 Mr. America title and the heavyweight division of the 1978 IFBB Mr. Universe.

In late 1979, he won the heavyweight class of the Mr. Olympia. In the 1980 Mr. Olympia, he placed fourth in a tie with Boyer Coe behind Arnold Schwarzenegger, Chris Dickerson and Frank Zane, though this placement was deemed controversial.

Influenced by the concepts developed by Arthur Jones, Mentzer devised and successfully implemented his own theory of bodybuilding. One of the most prolific bodybuilders of all time, his Heavy Duty Training program advocates high intensity and low volume. In 2002, he was inducted into the IFBB Hall of Fame.

== Early life and education ==
Mike Mentzer was born on November 15, 1951, in the Germantown section of Philadelphia. His father was of German descent while his mother was of Italian descent. He attended Ephrata High School, where he received "all A's." He credits his 11th -grade teacher, Elizabeth Schaub, for his "love of language, thought, and writing." In 1975, he began attending the University of Maryland as a pre‑med student, where his hours away from the gym were spent in the study of "genetics, physical chemistry, and organic chemistry." After three years' study at the University of Maryland, Mentzer dropped out. He said his ultimate goal during that period was to become a psychiatrist.

== Bodybuilding career ==
=== Amateur ===
Mentzer started bodybuilding when he was 11 years old at a body weight of 95 lb (43 kg) after seeing the physiques of men exhibited on the covers of several muscle magazines. His father bought him a set of weights and an instruction booklet. The booklet suggested that he train no more than three days a week, so Mike did just that. He attended the first Mr. Olympia and later said: “The 1965 Mr. Olympia contest was almost a religious experience for me." At 15 years old, Mike's goal was to look like his bodybuilding hero, Bill Pearl. After graduating from high school, Mentzer served four years in the United States Air Force. It was during this time he started working out over three hours a day, six days a week.

Mentzer started competing in local physique contests when he was 18 years old and attended his first contest in 1969. In 1971, Mentzer entered and won the Mr. Lancaster contest. In 1971, he suffered his worst defeat, placing 10th at the AAU Mr. America, which was won by Casey Viator. Mentzer considered his presence at this contest important later on, as he met Viator, who gave Mentzer the contact information for his trainer Arthur Jones. Due to a severe shoulder injury, he was forced to quit training from 1971 to 1974. In early 1975, however, he resumed training and returned to competition in 1975 at the Mr. America contest, placing third behind Robby Robinson and Roger Callard. Mentzer went on to win the competition the following year in 1976. He won the 1977 North America championships in Vancouver, British Columbia, Canada, and competed a week later at the 1977 Mr. Universe in Nîmes, France, placing second to Kal Szkalak. In 1978, Mentzer won the Mr. Universe in Acapulco, Mexico with the first and only perfect 300 score. He became a professional bodybuilder after that 1978 Universe win.

=== Professional ===
In late 1979, Mentzer won the heavyweight class of the Mr. Olympia, again with a perfect 300 score. However, he lost in the overall to Frank Zane (who was awarded his third title) that year. In the 1980 Mr. Olympia, he placed fourth in a tie with Boyer Coe behind Arnold Schwarzenegger, Chris Dickerson, and Frank Zane. This decision remains extremely controversial, as many believed that Arnold was in much worse condition than in his prior success in body building, due to his inactivity in bodybuilding in order to pursue his acting career.

=== Retirement ===
Mentzer retired from competitive bodybuilding after the 1980 Mr. Olympia at the age of 29. He maintained that the contest results were predetermined in favor of Schwarzenegger, and held this opinion throughout his life. While Mentzer never claimed he should have won, he maintained that Schwarzenegger should not have. Nevertheless, the two eventually had an amicable relationship.

=== Legacy ===
In 2002, Mentzer was inducted into the IFBB Hall of Fame. He appears in the music video for the Nantucket's cover of "It's a Long Way to the Top".

=== Bodybuilding philosophy ===
Mentzer held to Objectivism, the capitalist philosophy of Ayn Rand. He insisted that philosophy and bodybuilding are one and the same, stating that "man is an indivisible entity, an integrated unit of mind and body." His books therefore concern themselves equally with philosophy and bodybuilding. Mentzer followed the bodybuilding concepts developed by Arthur Jones and endeavored to perfect them. Through years of study, observation, knowledge of stress physiology, the most up-to-date scientific information available, and careful use of his reasoning abilities, Mentzer devised and successfully implemented his own theory of bodybuilding. Mentzer's theories are intended to help a drug-free person achieve their full genetic potential within the shortest amount of time.

High-Intensity Training the Mike Mentzer Way was Mentzer's final work. In it, he detailed the principles of high intensity weight training. Weight training, he insisted, had to be brief, infrequent, and intense, to attain the best results in the shortest amount of time. Heavy Duty II also espouses critical thinking. In this book, Mentzer shows why people need to use their reasoning ability to live happy, mature, adult lives, and he shows readers how to go about doing so. Bodybuilding was endorsed as only one potential component of an individual's existence, encouraging many other worthwhile pursuits throughout his books.

=== Diet and nutrition ===
In his book Heavy Duty Nutrition, Mentzer demonstrated that nutrition for athletes did not need to be nearly as extreme as the bodybuilding industry would lead one to believe. His recommended diets were well balanced, and he espoused eating from all four food groups, totaling four servings each of high-quality grains and fruits, and two each of dairy and protein daily, all year-round.

Mentzer believed that carbohydrates should make up the bulk of the caloric intake, 50–60%, rather than protein as others preferred. Mentzer's reasoning was simple: to build 10 pounds of muscle in a year, a total of 6000 extra calories needed to be ingested throughout the year, because one pound of muscle contains 600 calories. That averages 16 extra calories per day, and only four of them needed to be from protein—because muscle is 22% protein, about one quarter.

=== Mentzer's heavy-duty training system ===
While Mike Mentzer served in the United States Air Force, he worked 12-hour shifts, and then followed that up with 'marathon workouts' as was the accepted standard in those days. In his first bodybuilding contest, he met the winner, Casey Viator. Mentzer learned that Viator trained in very high intensity (heavy weights for as many repetitions as possible, to total muscle fatigue), for very brief (20–45 minutes per session) and infrequent training sessions. Mentzer also learned that Viator almost exclusively worked out with the relatively new Nautilus machines, created and marketed by Arthur Jones in DeLand, Florida. Mentzer and Jones soon met and became friends.

Jones pioneered the principles of high-intensity training in the late 1960s. He emphasized the need to maintain perfectly strict form, move the weights in a slow and controlled manner, work the muscles to complete failure (positive and negative), and avoid overtraining. Casey Viator saw fantastic results training under the direction of Jones, and Mentzer became very interested in this training philosophy. Eventually, however, Mentzer concluded that even Jones was not completely applying his own principles, so Mentzer began investigating a more full application of them. He began training clients in a near-experimental manner, evaluating the perfect number of repetitions, exercises, and days of rest to achieve maximum benefits.

For more than ten years, Mentzer's Heavy Duty program involved 7–9 sets per workout on a three-day-per-week schedule. With the advent of "modern bodybuilding" (where bodybuilders became more massive than ever before) by the early 1990s, he ultimately modified that routine until there were fewer working sets and more days of rest. According to Mentzer's 'Ideal (Principled) Routine', outlined in High-Intensity Training the Mike Mentzer Way, fewer than five working sets were performed each session and rest was emphasized, calling for 4–7 days of recovery before the next workout. He pushed sets beyond failure with such techniques as forced reps, negative reps, and static holds. According to Mentzer, biologists and physiologists since the nineteenth century have known that hypertrophy is directly related to intensity, not duration, of effort. Most bodybuilding and weightlifting authorities do not take into account the severe nature of the stress imposed by heavy, strenuous resistance exercise carried to the point of positive muscular failure.

Mentzer's training courses (books and audio tapes), sold through bodybuilding magazines, were extremely popular, beginning after Mentzer won the 1978 IFBB Mr. Universe contest. This contest gathered a lot of attention, because at it he became the first bodybuilder ever to receive a perfect 300 score from the judges. Some time later, Mentzer attracted more attention when he introduced Dorian Yates to high-intensity training, and put him through his first series of workouts in the early 1990s. Yates went on to win the Mr. Olympia six consecutive times, from 1992 to 1997.

=== Contest history ===
- 1969 Mr. Lancaster County – 1st
- 1970 Mr. Pennsylvania - 1st
- 1971 AAU Mr. America – 10th
- 1971 AAU Teen Mr America – 2nd
- 1975 IFBB Mr. America – 3rd (Medium)
- 1975 ABBA Mr. USA – 2nd (Medium)
- 1976 IFBB Mr. America – 1st (Overall)
- 1976 IFBB Mr. America – 1st (Medium)
- 1976 IFBB Mr. Universe – 2nd (MW)
- 1977 IFBB North American Championships – 1st (Overall)
- 1977 IFBB North American Championships – 1st (MW)
- 1977 IFBB Mr. Universe – 2nd (HW)
- 1978 IFBB USA vs the World – 1st (HW)
- 1978 IFBB World Amateur Championships – 1st (HW)
- 1978 IFBB Mr. Universe - 1st
- 1979 IFBB Canada Pro Cup – 2nd
- 1979 IFBB Florida Pro Invitational – 1st
- 1979 IFBB Night of Champions – 3rd
- 1979 IFBB Mr. Olympia – 2nd Overall, 1st (Heavyweight Division)
- 1979 IFBB Pittsburgh Pro Invitational – 2nd
- 1979 IFBB Southern Pro Cup – 1st
- 1980 IFBB Mr. Olympia – 5th

== Personal life ==
=== Beliefs about a Creator ===
Mentzer stated in the last interview before his death that he did not believe in God "as He is commonly defined", but that "There is what's called a rational view of a creator. As I said, there cannot be a God as He is commonly defined. God is infinite, God is everywhere, God created the universe - that's an interesting one. There's no such thing as creating the universe or causing the universe to come into existence, as the universe is the ground of all causation! If there was a God, He would have to consist of some material substance and He'd have to live somewhere. Therefore, existence always existed, even in the context you just gave. If, as you said, it was proven somehow beyond a shadow of a doubt there was a rational creator and a life hereafter, yes, I would grab at the chance to be with my mother and father again."

=== Objectivism ===
While in school, Mentzer's father motivated his academic performance by providing him with various kinds of inducements, from a baseball glove to hard cash. Years later, Mike said that his father "unwittingly ... was inculcating in me an appreciation of capitalism." According to David M. Sears, a friend of Mentzer and an editor and publisher of his Muscles in Minutes book, he stated that:

As you know, Mike was a voracious reader of philosophy in college-so that would put him at, say 18 years old, in 1970. He read the more traditional philosophers then, and "probably" didn't fully embrace Ayn Rand until the mid- or later 1980s (since none of his writings mentioned her until at least the mid-80s if not later). In my opinion, Mike's ideas on bodybuilding were "allowed" to emerge because of his Objectivism. His approach to critical thought, analytical thinking, and knowing there is one truth, all allowed him to buck conventional thought and push onward with his own mental effort.

— David M. Sears

Regarding what he learned from Ayn Rand, Mentzer said in an interview:

Learning logic and acquiring the ability to think critically is not easy, though not impossibly difficult. I learned how to do these things by reading and "digesting" the works of novelist/philosopher, Ayn Rand. To get started on the proper, methodical path read her books of explicit philosophic essays Philosophy: Who Needs It — especially the Introduction and the first two chapters – and The Romantic Manifesto – especially the second chapter, "Philosophy and Sense of Life." After reading and re-reading the first couple of chapters from each of those books, put them aside for a while and read her two epochally great novels — The Fountainhead and Atlas Shrugged, in that respective order. Just as is true with any other context of knowledge, philosophy must be studied in a logically structured order ...

— Mike Mentzer

In his last interview before his death, Mentzer said he was delighted to get so many phone clients and close personal bodybuilding friends, such as Markus Reinhardt, who had been influenced by him to become Objectivists. He described Objectivism as the best philosophy ever devised. He also criticized the philosophy of Immanuel Kant, which he described as an "evil philosophy," because according to him Kant set out to destroy man's mind by undercutting his confidence in reason. He also criticized the teaching of Kantianism in schools and universities and said it's very difficult for an Objectivist philosopher with a PhD to get a job in any of the universities.

== Final years ==
In the late 1980s, Mentzer returned to training bodybuilders and writing for Iron Man magazine and spent much of the 1990s regaining his stature in the bodybuilding industry. Mentzer met Dorian Yates in the 1980s and made an impression on his bodybuilding career. Years later, when Yates won Joe Weider's "Mr. Olympia", he credited Mike's "Heavy Duty" principles for his training. Mike, his brother Ray, and Dorian formed a clothing company called "MYM" (an abbreviation of Mentzer Yates Mentzer), also known as "Heavy Duty Inc", in 1994. MYM was based on the success of Don Smith's "CrazeeWear" bodybuilding apparel. With the blessing and promotion of Joe Weider, the trio manufactured and distributed their own line of cut-and-sew sportswear.

== Death ==
Mike Mentzer died on June 10, 2001, in Rolling Hills, California. He was found dead in his apartment, due to heart complications, by his younger brother and fellow bodybuilder Ray Mentzer. Two days later, Ray died from complications of Berger's disease.

== See also ==
- List of male professional bodybuilders

Mr. Olympia
Preceded by Robby Robinson	Heavyweight Champion; 1979	Weight classes abolished
