= MedX Corporation =

American manufacturer of physiatric equipment

MedX Corporation is a privately owned company based in Ocala, Florida. MedX is the manufacture of spinal rehabilitation equipment and premium exercise equipment. MedX equipment was invented by Arthur Jones, who was also the inventor of Nautilus exercise equipment. MedX Equipment includes the MedX Medical Lumbar Machine, Medical Cervical Machine and 25 exercise pieces. MedX Medical Lumbar machine is researched as an effective treatment for back pain.
