= Ray Mentzer =

American bodybuilder (1953–2001)

- Professional bodybuilder

Personal info
- Born: August 3, 1953; Philadelphia, Pennsylvania, U.S.
- Died: June 12, 2001 (aged 47); Rolling Hills, California, U.S.

Best statistics
- Height: 5 ft 9 in (1.75 m)
- Weight: 220 lb (100 kg)

Professional (Pro) career
- Best win: Mr. America; 1979

Raymond Harry “Ray” Mentzer (August 3, 1953 – June 12, 2001) was an American IFBB professional bodybuilder who won the 1976 Junior Mr. America, 1978 IFBB Mr. USA and the 1979 Mr. America competition. Ray's brother, Mike Mentzer, won the rival IFBB Mr. America in 1976 during Mentzer's Junior title.

Mentzer was a proponent of heavy duty training along with Mike and although retiring from competition in 1982, carried on training to the heavy duty high-intensity training principles. In 1983, he flew to Florida in order to be trained by Arthur Jones. At a bodyweight of a then unthinkable 250 plus pounds, Mentzer added even more muscle within a month, to 260 but leaner. At one time, training for just six weeks to prove the invalidity of the Bulgarian system, Mentzer squatted 902 pounds (409 kg) for 2 repetitions.

Mentzer died from kidney failure, a complication resulting from Berger's disease, aged 47 in Rolling Hills, California. He had been on dialysis due to kidney failure for years. Mentzer died just two days after discovering his brother Mike Mentzer's body in the same apartment due to heart failure. They had filmed a bodybuilding documentary the day before Mike Mentzer's death.
