= Repetition (bodybuilding) =

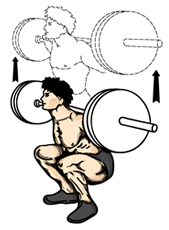
Diagram of a person performing a squat

Repetition (repeat) — re-performing a specific movement exercises with the burden in one approach (set) in bodybuilding, powerlifting, weightlifting and some other strength sports. The repetition of the exercises is a kind of methods and principles of strength training, which are resorted to by athletes with a long experience of training for the new "shock" of muscles, contributing to the release of "stagnation" (plateau effect), the continuation of muscle growth, as well as recovery from overtraining (that is, a kind of "rest"), or, conversely, consciously bringing yourself to a state close to overtraining, for example, before performances, when you need a gradual increase in the intensity of training and muscle to strength fixation and / or “drying” for performance in competitions — lifting extra-large weights or demonstrating muscle relief.

== Links ==
- Greg Zulak. «Repetitions». 1 (ru), 2 (ru). Magazine «IronMan».
- Brian Johnston. «Repetitions. Scientific review of training with weights». 1 (ru), 2 (ru), 3 (ru). Magazine «IronMan».

== See also ==
- Super Slow
- One-repetition maximum
