= Casey Viator =

American bodybuilder and journalist

Casey Viator/Casius Viatoro (September 4, 1951 – September 4, 2013) was an American professional bodybuilder. He is noted as the youngest ever AAU Mr. America – gaining the title at the age of 19 in 1971.

Viator grew up in New Iberia, Louisiana, and began training with Kenwood Broussard. In 1968, Viator placed third in the Mr. Louisiana contest. The following year, he came in sixth in the 1969 Teen Mr. America, but won in the categories Best Arms, Best Abs, Best Chest, Best Legs and Most Muscular. In 1970, Viator's upper arm measured at 19 5/16 inches, and his forearm at 15 7/16 inches.

He trained under the guidance of Arthur Jones for ten months prior to the Mr. America contest at DeLand High School in DeLand, Florida. The two first met briefly at the 1970 Mr. America contest in Los Angeles, California, where Viator, at age 18, placed third. Realizing Viator's potential, Jones offered Viator a job at his business, Arthur Jones Productions (later known as Nautilus Sports Medicine).

Viator won the Teen Age Mr. America championship, Jr. Mister America championship, and the title of Mr. America. He competed in the 1980 and 1982 Mr. Olympia, in which he earned third place.

Viator was a writer for Muscle & Fitness and Flex magazines.

Viator died on September 4, 2013, due to a massive heart attack on his 62nd birthday.

== Titles won ==
- 1970 AAU Teen Mr. America
- 1970 AAU Teen Mr. America (Most Muscular)
- 1970 AAU Mr. USA
- 1971 AAU Mr. USA
- 1971 AAU Jr. Mr. America
- 1971 AAU Mr. America
- 1980 IFBB Louisiana Grand Prix
- 1980 IFBB Pennsylvania Grand Prix
- 1980 Pittsburgh Pro Invitational

== See also ==
- Colorado Experiment, in which he gained 63 pounds of muscle in four weeks
- List of male professional bodybuilders
- List of female professional bodybuilders
