= Arthur Jones (inventor) =

American inventor (1926–2007)

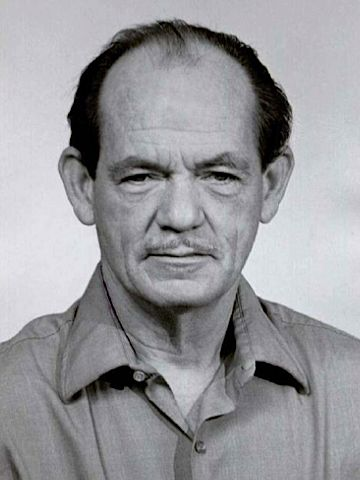
- Arthur Allen Jones
- Born: November 22, 1926; Arkansas, U.S.
- Died: August 28, 2007 (aged 80); Orlando, Florida, U.S.
- Occupations: Inventor, exercise philosopher
- Known for: Nautilus exercise machines Pioneering HIT(High Intensity Training)

Arthur Allen Jones (November 22, 1926 – August 28, 2007) was the founder of Nautilus, Inc. and MedX, Inc. and the inventor of the Nautilus exercise machines, including the Nautilus pullover, which was first sold in 1970. He was a pioneer in the field of weight and strength training. He was born in Arkansas and grew up in Seminole, Oklahoma.

== Accomplishments ==
Jones's ideas tried to move the public's notion of bodybuilding and strength-training exercise away from the Arnold Schwarzenegger school of training, which involved hours in the gym using free weights, to high intensity training. This involves short, single sets, with each set taken to the point of complete muscular failure with a fullbody workout frequency of three times a week with the intention to maximize muscular hypertrophy and strength increases. (Later in his life, he recommended doing it once or twice a week.) Jones said: “The secret, if there is one, is high intensity. And when you actually train with high-intensity, you don’t need a lot of volume.”

Famous individuals who trained under Jones's supervision include Casey Viator (who participated in the Colorado Experiment), Eddie Robinson (who worked with and participated in and trained under Jones's Nautilus leverage line), IFBB professional bodybuilders Mike and Ray Mentzer (both won the Mr. America IFBB and AAU respectively), Sergio Oliva (winner of every major bodybuilding contest and was also the only individual to win the Mr. Olympia over Arnold Schwarzenegger who placed 2nd), and Boyer Coe (Mr. America, Mr.International, Mr.Universe etc.).

Jones's publications included the Nautilus Bulletins, which dispelled contemporary myths of exercise and resistance training. He also wrote and published "The Cervical Spine, Lumbar Spine And The Knee," which provided for the first time a complete description of the function of the lumbar spine and its true range of motion.

Additional publications included the results of Jones's studies on the differing responses of muscular structures exposed to varying amounts of exercise throughout limited and unlimited range of motion. Jones labeled these responses as type S response for specific and type G for general. He was among the first researchers to experiment with exclusively eccentric training on test subjects and among the first to suggest the superiority and importance of eccentric training for strength. He was the inventor of infimetric and akinetic exercise equipment. He was the first exercise machine designer to utilize cams, as opposed to pulleys, in exercise machines, making possible for the first time resistance that varied along the force curves generated by human muscular structures.

It was the advent of Nautilus machines that made resistance training appealing to the general public, fueling the fitness boom of the 1970s and 80s and resulting in Nautilus gyms in strip malls across America.

Nautilus, Inc. markets the Bowflex, Stairmaster, and Nautilus product lines. These new product lines are not affiliated with Jones. The Bowflex "power rod" bending technology is in part based on Jones's ideas due to its use of variable resistance.

The Nautilus machines and the company he formed to sell them made Jones a multimillionaire and landed him on the Forbes list of the 400 richest people. At one point, financial analysts estimated that Nautilus was grossing $400 million annually. He sold Nautilus Inc. in 1986 for $23 million. He also sold MedX Corporation in 1996 and then retired.

== Death ==
On August 28, 2007, Jones died from natural causes at his home in Ocala, Florida, at age 80. He was survived by two daughters and two sons.

== Inventions ==
Arthur Jones was a prolific inventor, holding numerous patents (many of which were assigned to Nautilus or MedX), most notably the elliptical cam (which replaces the pulley) to provide variable resistance through the range of motion.

Patent	Title
3,858,873	Weight lifting exercising devices
3,998,454	Force receiving exercising member
4,257,592	Exercising apparatus with improvements in handle structure, rope arrangement, and clamping means
4,493,485	Exercising apparatus and method
4,500,089	Weight lifting lower back exercising machine
4,511,137	Compound weight lifting exercising machine
4,600,196	Exercising machine with variable resistance
4,666,152	Lower back exercising machine
4,836,536	Apparatus for exercising muscles of the lower trunk of the human body
4,858,919	Apparatus for testing or exercising muscles of the lower trunk of the human body
4,902,008	Method and apparatus for testing or exercising muscles of the lower trunk of the human body
4,902,009	Machine for exercising and/or testing muscles of the lower trunk, and method
4,989,859	Method for testing and/or exercising the rotary neck muscles of the human body
5,002,269	Apparatus for testing and/or exercising the cervical muscles of the human body
5,004,230	Method and apparatus for exercising or testing rotary torso muscles
5,005,830	Machine for exercising and/or testing muscles of the lower trunk
5,007,634	Method and apparatus for restraining the legs and pelvis for exercising and/or testing the lower trunk of the human body
5,088,727	Apparatus for exercising or testing rotary torso muscles
5,092,584	Apparatus for testing and/or exercising the rotary neck muscles of the human body
5,092,585	Apparatus for testing and/or exercising the cervical muscles of the human body
5,092,590	Method for exercising and/or testing muscles of the lower trunk
5,104,364	Method for exercising or testing rotary torso muscles
5,112,286	Method of testing and/or exercising the cervical muscles of the human body
5,118,098	Method for testing and/or exercising the rotary neck muscles of the human body
5,135,452	Apparatus for testing and/or exercising muscles of the human body
5,149,313	Method for exercising and/or testing muscles of the lower trunk
5,171,198	Lateral raise exercise machine
5,171,200	Method and apparatus for exercising the lumbar muscles
5,178,597	Method of testing and/or exercising the cervical muscles of the human body
5,256,125	Biceps curl machine
5,273,508	Method and apparatus for exercising muscles of the upper legs and lower torso
5,304,107	Exercise machine
5,338,274	Leg exercise machines
5,342,270	Exercise machine for upper torso
5,366,429	Apparatus for exercising muscles of the upper legs and lower torso
5,409,438	Lateral raise exercise machine
5,421,796	Triceps exercise machine
5,484,365	Leg press exercise machine
5,499,962	Leg exercise machines having retractable leg support and methods
5,575,743	Method and apparatus for exercising adductor muscles
5,575,744	Abductor exercise machine
5,667,463	Exercise machines and methods
5,762,585	Machine and method for exercising and/or testing muscles
5,762,591	Exercise machines and methods
5,800,310	Machine and method for measuring strength of muscles with aid of a computer
5,833,585	Method and apparatus for exercising muscles
5,928,112	Machine for exercising and/or testing muscles of the human body
6,228,000	Machine and method for measuring strength of muscles with aid of a computer

== Other interests ==
Jones often prided himself on being a generalist, something which he describes as a move away from the stubbornness and short-sightedness of 'specialists'. He attributed this in part to his upbringing in a family of physicians, as he found their attitudes toward medicine revolved around what they were taught and nothing else. One of his favorite quotes was Robert A. Heinlein's "specialization is for insects." He often cited that his observations gained from flying allowed him to understand the requirements for developing exercise machines. He believed in the competent man, that, as Heinlein also said, "a man should be able to put food on the table, build a house, tan a hide and deliver a baby."

Jones traveled and 'adventured' widely, occasionally with friend and fellow adventurer Roy Pinney (Jones's cameraman for a syndicated TV series called Wild Cargo), setting up camp for two years or so at a time in different places such as Rhodesia (now Zimbabwe) and Mexico City. His motto was "younger women, faster airplanes, and bigger crocodiles." Jones's Lake Helen, Florida, Nautilus building was the home of Gomek, an 18-foot salt water crocodile that Jones was trying to grow to world record size. He was also an aficionado of venomous spiders and reptiles, a large collection of which was also housed in the Nautilus building. He ran a business that involved the importation of a variety of wild animals, ranging from tropical fish to snakes, parrots and monkeys. Jones's household included a jaguar named "Gaylord" that had free run of the house and even slept on the bed with his daughter. He once retrofitted several of his jumbo jets in order to transport 63 baby elephants, that had been orphaned in Africa, to his Jumbo Lair compound in Florida. Jones filmed the entire operation for television and entitled it Operation Elephant.

Jones was the creator of the "Jumbolair" estate, originally created as a haven of 350 acres (1.4 km^{2}) for orphaned African elephants and other wildlife. He also kept two rhinos and a 600 lb male silverback gorilla that he named Mickey on the Jumbo Lair compound.

After WWII, he developed and owned a zoo in Slidell, Louisiana where he provided animals for the 1956 Roger Corman movie Swamp Women.

He also founded MedX Corporation, in which he invested 120 million dollars, to develop medical-based exercise and testing equipment for the cervical spine, lumbar spine and the knee.

In 1962, he wrote, produced, and directed the movie Voodoo Swamp.
