= Peloton Interactive =

American exercise equipment manufacturer

Peloton Interactive, Inc.

- Peloton Interactive's Headquarters in Manhattan
- Type: Public
- Traded as: Nasdaq: PTON (Class A); Russell 2000 component; S&P 600 component
- Industry: Exercise equipment
- Founded: January 3, 2012; 14 years ago
- Founders: Graham Stanton; Hisao Kushi; John Foley; Tom Cortese; Yony Feng
- Headquarters: New York City, U.S.
- Number of locations: 135 showrooms and 2 studios
- Key people: Peter Stern (CEO); Jay Hoag (chairperson); Nick Caldwell
- Products: Stationary bicycles and treadmills
- Services: Fitness classes and subscriptions
- Revenue: ▼US$2.491 billion (2025)
- Operating income: ▲US$–36.2 million (2025)
- Net income: ▲US$–119 million (2025)
- Total assets: ▼US$2.125 billion (2025)
- Total equity: ▲US$–414 million (2025)
- Number of employees: 2,145 (2025)
- Website: onepeloton.com
- Footnotes; Financials as of June 30, 2025.

Peloton Interactive, Inc. is an American exercise equipment and media company based in New York City. The company's products include stationary bicycles, treadmills, and indoor rowers equipped with Internet-connected touch screens that stream live and on-demand fitness classes through a subscription service. The equipment includes built-in sensors that track metrics such as power output, providing users with real-time feedback on their performance and leaderboard rankings to compete with other users.

Peloton charges a US$49.99 monthly membership fee to access classes and additional features on their exercise equipment, or $12.99 for users only accessing the content via app or website.

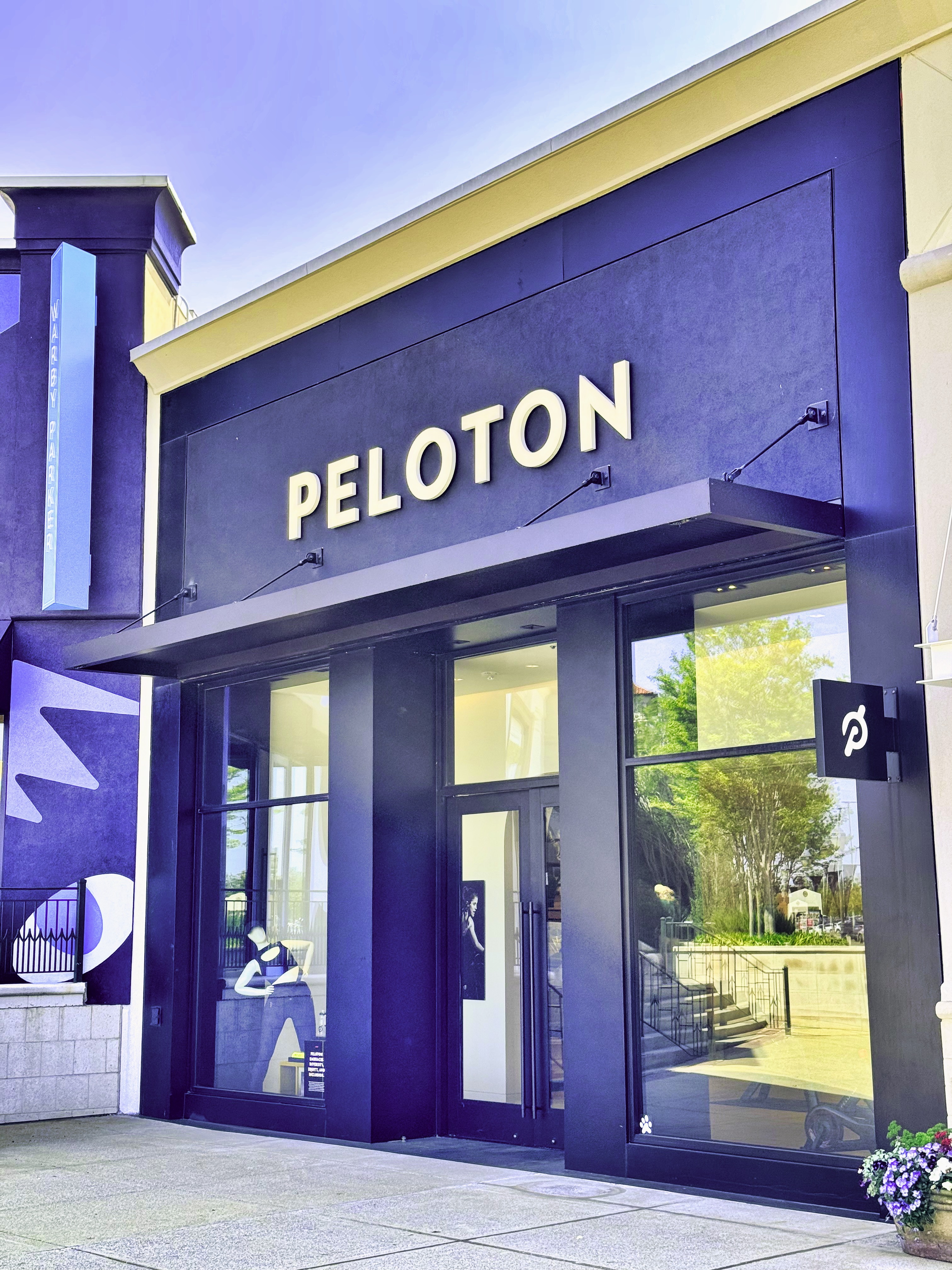
Peloton retail store at The Summit, Birmingham, Alabama

== History ==
=== Founding to IPO ===
In 2011, John Foley, an executive at Barnes & Noble in New York City, pitched his colleague, Tom Cortese, on the idea that technology could make it possible for people with little time to get the full experience of working out in a high-end studio cycling class in their homes. Peloton Interactive was founded in January 2012. "Peloton" is a cycling term, meaning a large group of riders bunched together.

The company raised $400,000 in seed money in February 2012 and another $3.5 million in December 2012. Peloton sold its first bike on Kickstarter in 2013 with an early bird price tag of $1,500. Their first Internet-connected stationary bicycle with a tablet was released in 2014. The company also opened showrooms in shopping centers around the US, for people to test out the machines, and "sales quickly soared" for the classes, encouraged by the online community of riders.

Peloton’s original treadmill, Tread+, was unveiled in January 2018 by the company at the annual Consumer Electronics Show in Las Vegas. In May 2018, Peloton announced plans to expand into Canada and the United Kingdom that fall. It also announced construction of a flagship studio at Manhattan West in New York City.

In March 2019, Peloton was sued by the National Music Publishers Association for using copyrighted music in their videos without proper synchronization licenses, seeking $150 million in damages. The action resulted in changes to music used in its sessions, as well as removal of certain programs that used the songs named in the suit. In September 2019, the suit was amended and increased to $300 million. Peloton settled the lawsuit in February 2020; financial terms were not disclosed.

On September 26, 2019, Peloton (ticker symbol: PTON) became a public company via an initial public offering, raising $1.16 billion and valuing the company at $8.1 billion. After reaching a market valuation of $50 billion in January 2021, the company's valuation was back to around $8 billion by April 2022. As of March 2025, Peloton's valuation is approximately $2.5 billion.

=== The Gift That Gives Back ad ===
In November 2019, the company released a new holiday commercial, "The Gift That Gives Back", where a wife, played by Monica Ruiz, receives a Peloton bike for Christmas from her husband, and, after using it, observes that she "didn't realize how much this would change me". The commercial received criticism from viewers who claimed that its plot implied that the woman's husband was dissatisfied with her physical appearance.

Peloton defended the ad, arguing that it was intended to celebrate a "fitness and wellness journey" that was inspired by how its users were often "meaningfully and positively impacted after purchasing or being gifted a Peloton Bike or Tread, often in ways that surprise them". Ruiz, the actress that played the wife, was hired for an ad titled "The Gift That Doesn't Give Back" for Aviation American Gin, released in December 2019, which lightly mocked the Peloton ad.

=== COVID-19 pandemic through 2021 ===
Sales increased significantly during the COVID-19 pandemic as home gyms became more popular during the COVID-19 lockdowns. However, the rapid increase in demand caused shipping delays, with customers receiving their products months late, leading some to cancel orders. In December 2020, the company made a $100 million investment in shipping solutions in an attempt to accelerate manufacturing and decrease shipping times.

==== Flywheel Sports lawsuit settlement ====
Due to Peloton's success, at least a dozen rivals, including Equinox, Icon Health & Fitness, and Flywheel Sports, began selling Peloton-style internet-connected bikes. In February 2020, Flywheel ceased its at-home cycling services after settling with Peloton over a patent lawsuit. Flywheel created its at-home internet-connected bike in 2017, and later admitted it illegally copied Peloton's technology. Court documents revealed that Flywheel created an internal initiative to obtain Peloton's confidential trade information. After Flywheel's service shut down, Peloton offered Flywheel users the opportunity to exchange their Flywheel bikes for refurbished Peloton bikes at no cost.

==== Tread and Tread+ safety recall ====
In May 2021, the U.S. Consumer Product Safety Commission warned people with children and pets to immediately stop using the Tread+ model of Peloton treadmill, after one child died after being pulled under the treadmill while a parent was running on it, and almost 40 others sustained injuries including fractured bones. The commission stated that when not in use, the product should be stored in a locked room to prevent children and pets from accessing it.

Peloton initially rejected the Consumer Product Safety Commission's request to recall the product and instead warned parents to keep children away from the treadmill, before it changed course and voluntarily recalled the Tread and Tread+ on May 5, 2021. The Tread model was also recalled due to reports of the touchscreen display screws loosening, causing the screen to occasionally detach and fall off. In July 2021, a Brooklyn couple filed a lawsuit for unspecified damages against the company claiming their 3-year-old son suffered third-degree burns after being trapped under the treadmill.

As part of the recall, Peloton allowed consumers to return the treadmills for a full refund until November 6, 2022. In August 2021, Peloton announced that Tread owners could schedule an in-home appointment for their treadmill's touchscreen to get repaired by a technician. Later that month, Peloton enacted safety features including the Tread Lock digital passcode to unlock the Tread, and a safety key that must be in place in order to begin use. The feature locks the treadmill after inactivity and requires a four-digit passcode to unlock.

==== Sex and the City plot point ====
In December 2021, on the first episode of the Sex and the City reboot And Just Like That..., the character Mr. Big (played by Chris Noth) has a heart attack and dies after riding a Peloton bike. The day after the initial airing of the episode, Peloton shares fell 11.3%. The company issued a statement through Dr. Suzanne Steinbaum, a cardiologist and member of the company's health and wellness advisory, saying that they agreed to the product placement but were not aware of how it would be used in the pivotal scene.

The statement also said not to blame the company for the character's death, and cited some contributing factors, such as his lifestyle (e.g., his consumption of steaks and cigars) and a cardiac surgery in a previous season. The company released an ad, narrated by Ryan Reynolds, with Reynolds citing the benefits of cycling and ending with, "He's alive." The ad was removed after Noth was accused of sexual assault by two women.

Several weeks later, an episode of the show Billions also featured a character experiencing a heart attack after using a Peloton device.

=== Stock turbulence and CEO changes ===
In January 2022, CNBC reported, citing internal company documents, that Peloton had temporarily paused production of its products after greatly increased demand during the early stages of the COVID pandemic had slackened, leaving the company with a glut of bikes and treadmills. The company denied the report. Peloton's share price quadrupled in 2020, before dropping nearly 80% in 2021.

In February 2022, 2,800 employees were laid off in an effort to save $800 million annually. CEO John Foley stepped down from his position, becoming executive chairman, and was replaced by Barry McCarthy, the former chief financial officer of Spotify and Netflix. As of April 2022, Foley controlled around 35% of voting power in the company.

On March 11, 2022, the company started testing a new pricing structure called One Peloton Club. Customers pay a one-time delivery fee plus a monthly fee to rent the Bike or Bike+. The monthly fee includes the bike and a subscription to access all workout classes.

On April 14, 2022, it was reported that Peloton reduced the prices of its stationary bikes and treadmills, and would raise the price of monthly subscriptions for classes for Peloton equipment owners. Starting in the US on June 1, 2022, the company raised the price for equipment content subscriptions to $44 per month. The app membership price remained unchanged. The starting price of bikes went down from $1,745 including shipping to $1,445 including shipping, and the starting price of treadmills was lowered from $2,845 including shipping to $2,695 including shipping.

In July 2022, it was reported that Peloton would outsource the manufacturing of its stationary bikes and treadmills rather than produce them in-house. The following month, the company announced to employees it would cut some 800 jobs and begin outsourcing some roles and positions.

In August 2022, the company announced it would start selling its bikes and gear through Amazon in order to increase the distribution of its products, a move that came after discussions of a potential takeover by Amazon or another firm. On Peloton's earnings call the same month, the company disclosed it had lost $1.2 billion in the fourth quarter. During this period, the company said that it was looking to sell used inventory. CEO Barry McCarthy referred to this as a top priority.

In September 2022, the company announced that co-founder John Foley, chief legal officer Hisao Kushi, and chief commercial officer Kevin Cornils were departing.

On May 4, 2024, Barry McCarthy resigned as CEO of Peloton, which also announced a 15% reduction in its workforce and a reduction of its retail operations due to a decrease in demand for its fitness products post pandemic.

By June 21, 2024, the company's market capitalization had declined to about $1.3 billion from an IPO valuation of $8.1 billion. The steady decline coincided with the departure of three of the company's "star instructors", and the company's CFO, Elizabeth Coddington, had begun to sell her restricted stock units as soon as they had vested.

On August 22, 2024, Peloton sent a letter to shareholders announcing the introduction of a one-time "used equipment fee" of $95 for second-hand equipment, in an effort to regain financial stability.

On January 1, 2025, Peter Stern, former Apple VP of Services, became CEO.

In April 2026, Peloton partnered with Spotify, adding a fitness hub on the Spotify app and giving Spotify premium users access to over 1,400 guided workout classes from Peloton.

=== Safety recall in 2023 ===
In May 2023, the Consumer Product Safety Commission announced the recall of 2.2 million of the company's Model PL01 exercise bicycles (introduced in 2018 and still a current production product) after 35 reports of seat posts breaking, including 13 reports of injuries that included one fractured wrist, lacerations and bruising. Owners of the devices were told to "immediately stop using" them until they could be repaired.

=== Acquisitions ===
In 2025, Peloton acquired Breathwrk, an app used to guide users through breathing exercises.

In 2026, the company acquired Skōp to increase its Pilates offerings.

== Products ==
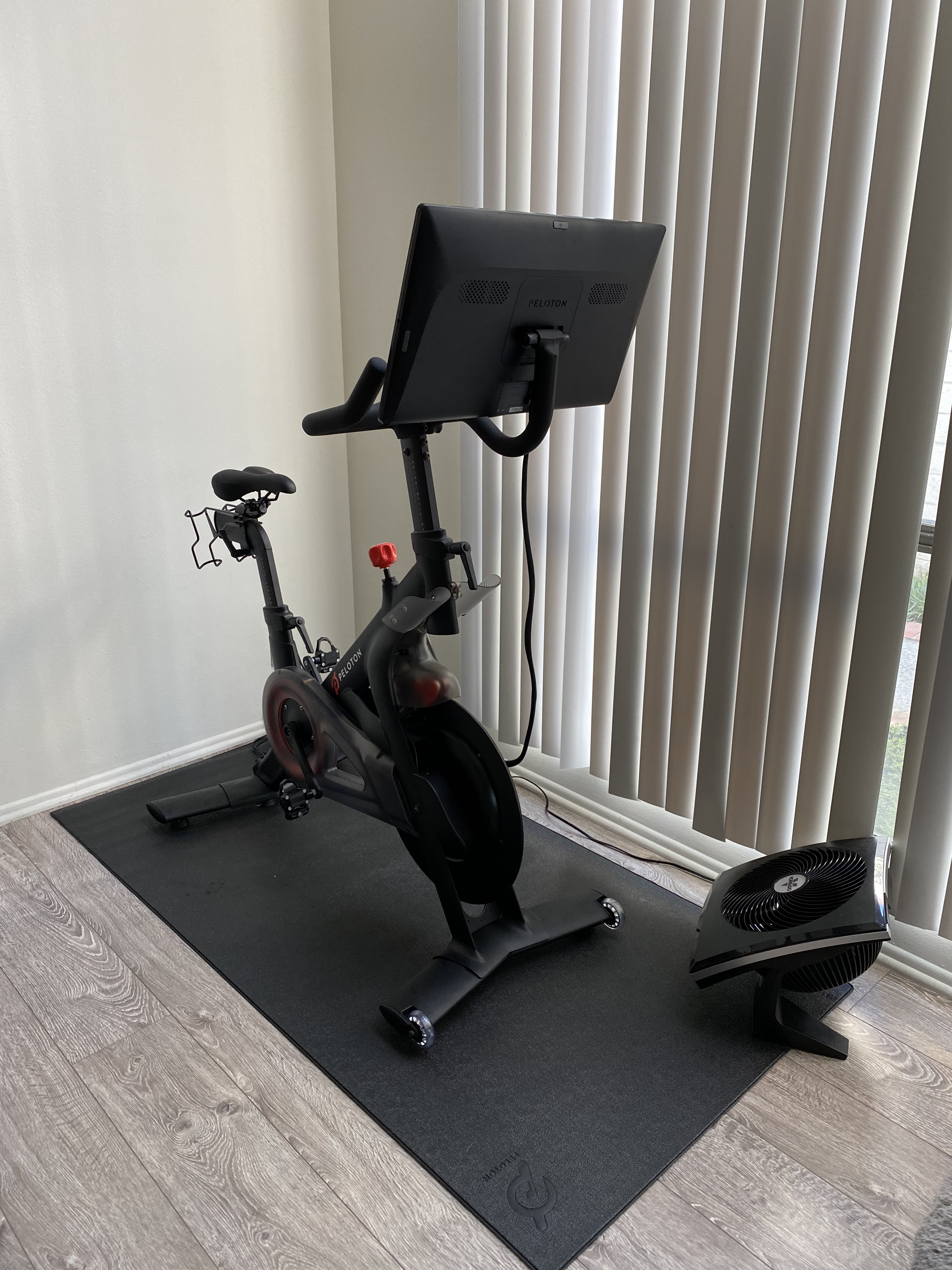
A Gen 3 Peloton bike

=== Bike and Bike+ ===
The Peloton Bikes are internet-connected stationary bicycles with a touchscreen that streams exercise classes to the rider. The device touchscreen operates on a custom version of Android. Classes can also be accessed through the Peloton App or website. Classes can be cast from the Bike to a TV using Miracast, and can be cast from the App or website to a TV using iOS and Android devices, such as AirPlay and Chromecast. Users could video chat with friends during classes, however that feature was discontinued in June, 2022. Those who purchase the Bike then pay a monthly subscription fee for access to live-streaming and on-demand classes through the tablet.

The Bike+ was introduced in September 2020. The Bike monitor is 21.5 inches in size, and is an HD touchscreen. The monitor used on the Bike+ is an HD touchscreen that is 23.8 inches and has a rotating feature. The Bike+ has an auto-resistance feature. Both have Bluetooth. Both bikes come with clip-in pedals that require cycling shoes, or users can purchase pedals that do not require cycling shoes.

=== Tread and Tread+ treadmills ===
The Tread+ (originally named the Tread) was unveiled in January 2018 by the company at the annual Consumer Electronics Show in Las Vegas. Classes are streamed via a 32″ touchscreen and sound bar mounted at the front of the machine. The treadmill features a slatted rubber running surface, a feature that is often compared to Woodway's professional treadmills.

In September 2020, Peloton released a lower-end treadmill called the Tread. The company renamed the original treadmill the Tread+. In late 2021, Peloton added safety key and 'Tread Lock' features to the Tread to increase safety and prevent unauthorized access.

=== Peloton Row indoor rower ===
In May 2022, Peloton teased and confirmed the forthcoming release of an indoor rowing machine at its 2022 Homecoming virtual event. In September 2022, the company announced the launch of Peloton Row, accepting pre-orders of its rowing machines for December deliveries. In 2022, the Peloton Row cost $3,195. In 2025, the Peloton Row cost $3,495.

=== Guide ===
In November 2021, Peloton announced the Peloton Guide, a connected fitness device to stream workouts with a movement-tracking camera to study the user's movements, track their workouts, and offer feedback and recommendations for Peloton classes. It was released on April 5, 2022, priced at $295, plus an introductory price of $24 per month for the service. It features a 12-megapixel wide-angle camera and streams 4K video at up to 60 frames per second. The built-in camera allows the user to see themselves onscreen and track their exercises alongside the instructor. At the end of the workout, they are shown a body activity breakdown, highlighting the muscles they have worked. They will also receive class recommendations based on their activity. Peloton Guide connects to any television or computer monitor via HDMI, and includes a remote control.

=== Digital membership ===
Users without Peloton exercise equipment stream all classes via a mobile app or website. The Peloton app is available on Apple TV, Amazon Fire TV, Roku, and Android TV, which is installed onto smart TVs from Sony, Philips, and Sharp Corporation.

The digital membership costs $12.99 per month. The subscription is discounted to $6.99 for students and $9.99 for healthcare workers, first responders and teachers.

While Peloton's Bike and Bike+ bundle (which includes a bike) remains a market leader in that segment, its Digital membership faces more competition. Cyclists who want to use their own bike instead of the company's stationary bike have several alternatives at similar prices.

== Class formats and features ==
=== Classes and instructors ===
While Peloton's flagship offerings are cycling and running classes using their exercise machines, they also offer classes in strength training, yoga, cardio aerobic exercise, meditation, stretching, Pilates, tread bootcamp, bike bootcamp, and walking. Classes are recorded daily and streamed live from instructors' homes or Peloton's cycling studios in Hudson Yards, Manhattan and London and are then uploaded to the Peloton library for on-demand access 24/7. Peloton produces up to 19 new classes a day.

Peloton also has special themed class formats like its Artist Series, which features playlists from featured musicians, including Alicia Keys, Britney Spears, and Bon Jovi. Series of classes also include charitable and celebrity collaborations, including the Our Future Selves series, featuring Ashton Kutcher, Peloton coach Becs Gentry, and Kutcher's non-profit organization, Thorn.

Some of the company's fitness instructors, including Robin Arzon, Emma Lovewell, and Jess King, have become celebrities and social media influencers. Peloton instructor Cody Rigsby participated on Dancing with the Stars season 30. Ally Love became the host of Netflix's Dance 100 and became a host of The Today Show in 2023.

=== Interactive and gamification features ===
Users can compete with one another on the live leaderboard that ranks class participants based on the Output (total wattage of energy expended). Peloton also tracks the Strive Score (based on the percentage of the maximum heart rate) using a Bluetooth heart rate monitor connected to the bike, treadmill, or phone. Unlike the Output metric, the Strive Score is non-competitive.

Users can tap someone's username on the leaderboard to give them a high five (a virtual show of encouragement).

The company first began testing a gaming-inspired workout class called Peloton Lanebreak in July 2021 and released it on Bike and Bike+ on February 17, 2022. The game is an obstacle course where players control a wheel-like avatar by pedaling along a six-lane track while using the resistance knob to change lanes and avoid obstacles. Players choose from a variety of levels with different genres of music and types of workouts at varying lengths and varying degrees of resistance. It is available as part of the All-Access membership on the Bike and Bike+.

== Other products and offerings ==
=== Showrooms ===
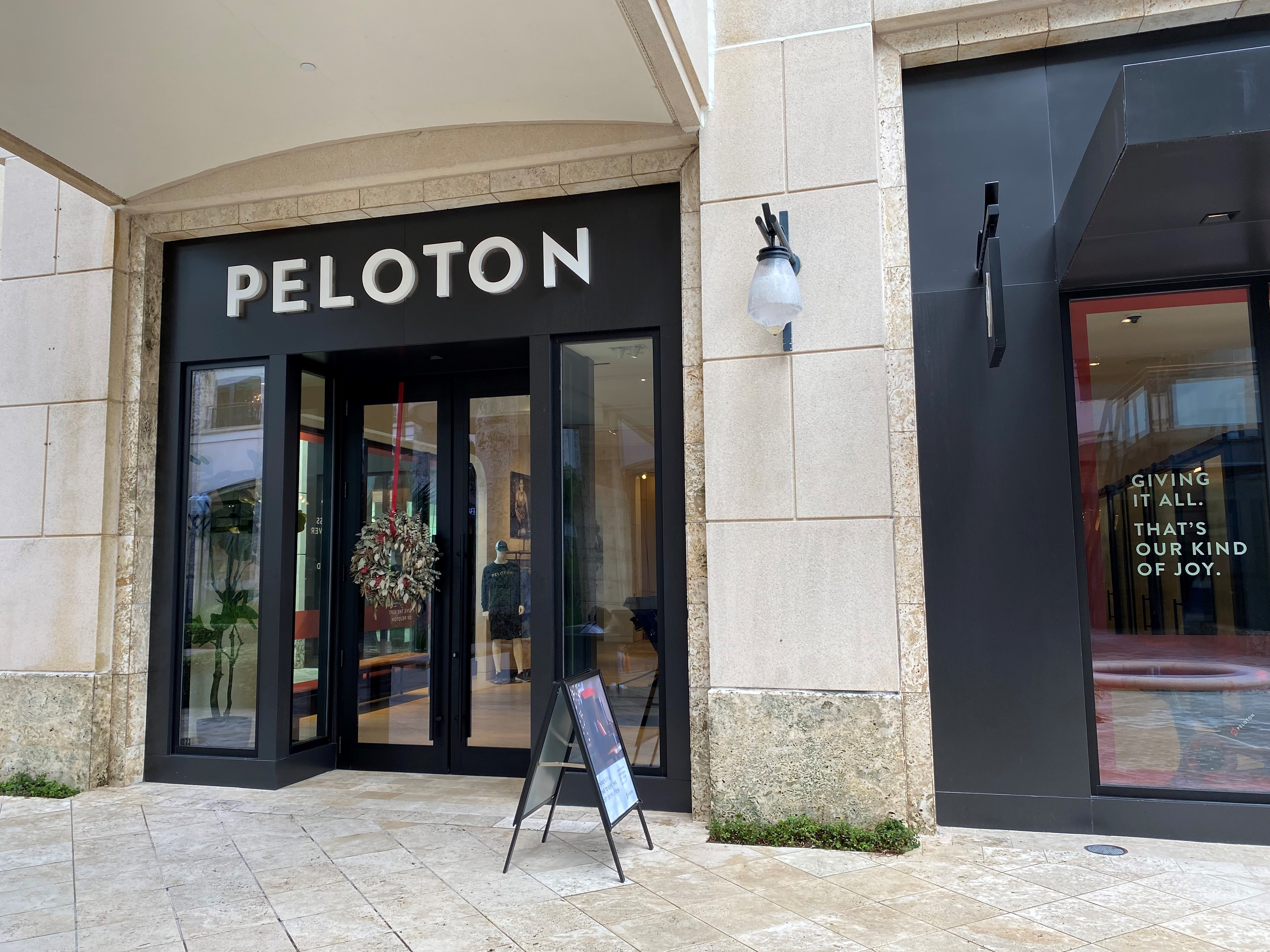
Peloton retail store

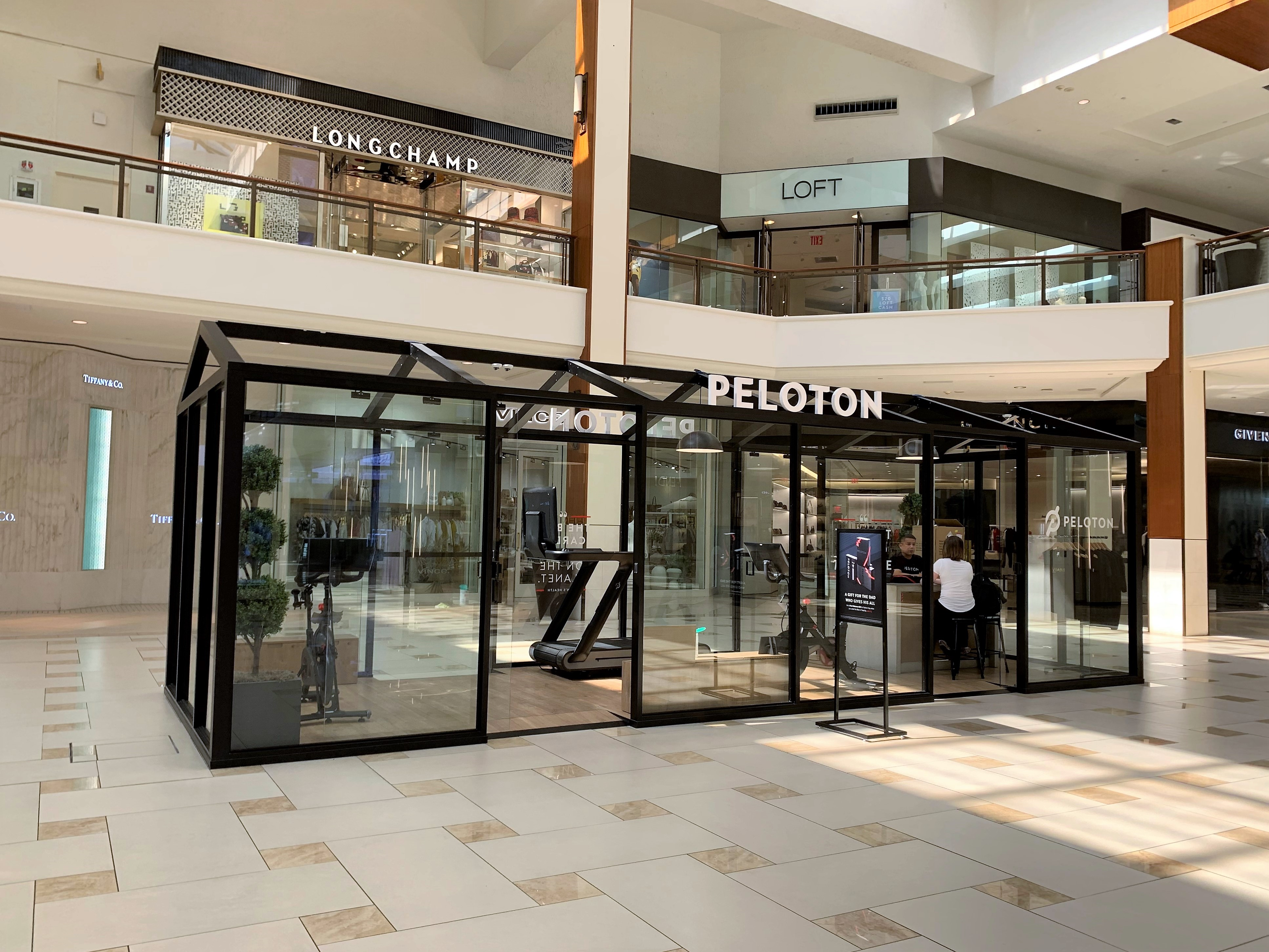
Peloton retail kiosk at Aventura Mall in Florida

Peloton has physical retail locations where prospective customers can learn about Peloton's offerings and products, and take a trial class on the Bike or Tread. The first location was at the Mall at Short Hills in New Jersey. As of 2022, Peloton has 97 showrooms in the United States and Canada, 5 in Australia, and 39 in the United Kingdom and Germany.

=== Peloton Homecoming event ===
The Homecoming event was originally organized by fans of the Peloton products in 2016 but, having gained the attention of the company, was adopted as a company-sanctioned event. It was held in person up to 2019 with a small-scale online fan event held in 2020.

At the beginning of May 2021, Peloton held a free online Homecoming event, consisting of three days of special classes, panel discussions on fitness and the introduction of new features and instructors. Homecoming 2022 was a two-day virtual event held on May 13–14.

=== Peloton studios ===
Peloton has two physical locations where its classes are filmed live and streamed to users. Prior to the COVID-19 pandemic, classes were filmed live with participants at its New York and London studios.

The New York studio was moved and upgraded at a cost of $50 million in 2020. In addition to the New York studio, classes are filmed at the London studio. The European location, which opened in 2018, also serves as the location for German-language classes with German instructors. Peloton Australia classes are filmed in the New York studio with Australian instructors. At the beginning of the COVID-19 pandemic, the studios were shut down and Peloton filmed live classes from the homes of select instructors, including those from New York and London. Peloton has announced plans to reopen its studios in New York and London in the summer of 2022.

=== Peloton apparel ===
Peloton sells branded activewear apparel items, often with collaborations with other fitness apparel companies like Adidas. In 2021 it launched a new line entirely made from its own private label.

In November 2021, athletic apparel retailer Lululemon sued Peloton accusing it of infringing on six design patents by selling "copycat" products. Peloton settled the lawsuit in September 2022 without admitting any wrongdoing, by agreeing to phase out the designs that Lululemon had objected to. The two companies ended up partnering in September 2023, with the Lululemon Studio Mirror being discontinued.

== Product specifications ==
Model		Peloton Bike (Gen 3)	Peloton Bike+	Peloton Tread	Peloton Tread (2021 update)	Peloton Tread+
CPU		2.0 GHz Mediatek MT8173 quad core processor	2.5 GHz Qualcomm QCS605 processor			
Memory		2 GB	4 GB			
Storage		16 GB				
Camera	Resolution	5 megapixel	8 megapixel	5 megapixel	8 megapixel	8 megapixel
Camera	privacy cover	No	Yes	No	No	Yes
Auto Follow		No	Yes	No	No	No
Rotating screen		No	Yes	No	No	No
GymKit Integration		No	Yes	No	No	No
Footprint		59" L x 23" W	59" L x 22" W	68" L x 33" W	68" L x 33" W	72.5" L x 36.5" W
Display		21.5" Diagonal	23.8" Diagonal	23.8" Diagonal	23.8" Diagonal	32" Diagonal
Speakers	Front-facing	None	2.2 Channel stereo speakers with 26 watts	2.2 Channel stereo speakers	2.2 Channel stereo speakers	soundbar with 20 watt and 70 Hz-20 kHz frequency response
Speakers	Rear-facing	2 Channel stereo speaker system with 16 watts	2.2 woofers	rear-facing woofers	rear-facing woofers	None
Input	3.5 mm headphone jack	Yes				
Input	USB	USB 2.0	USB-C			
Connectivity	WiFi	Yes	WiFi 2.4 GHz & 5 GHz	WiFi 2.4 GHz & 5 GHz	WiFi 2.4 GHz & 5 GHz	WiFi 2.4 GHz & 5 GHz
Connectivity	Bluetooth	4	5	5	5	4
Connectivity	ANT+	Yes				
Connectivity	Ethernet	100 Mbit/s	No	100 Mbit/s	100 Mbit/s	No
Other features					Safety key	
Weight		135 lb	140 lb	290 Ib	290 Ib	455 lb

== See also ==
- Similar manufacturers of exercise equipment:
  - BowFlex, Inc.
  - Concept2
  - Johnson Health Tech
  - NordicTrack
