= Johnson Health Tech =

Multinational company

Johnson Health Tech 喬山健康科技
- Industry: Fitness industry
- Founded: 1975; 51 years ago Taichung, Taiwan
- Founder: Peter Lo
- Headquarters: Taichung, Taiwan
- Number of locations: Worldwide
- Area served: Worldwide
- Products: Fitness equipments
- Subsidiaries: Johnson Fitness & Wellness, Horizon Fitness, Matrix Fitness, Vision Fitness
- Website: www.johnsonhealthtech.com

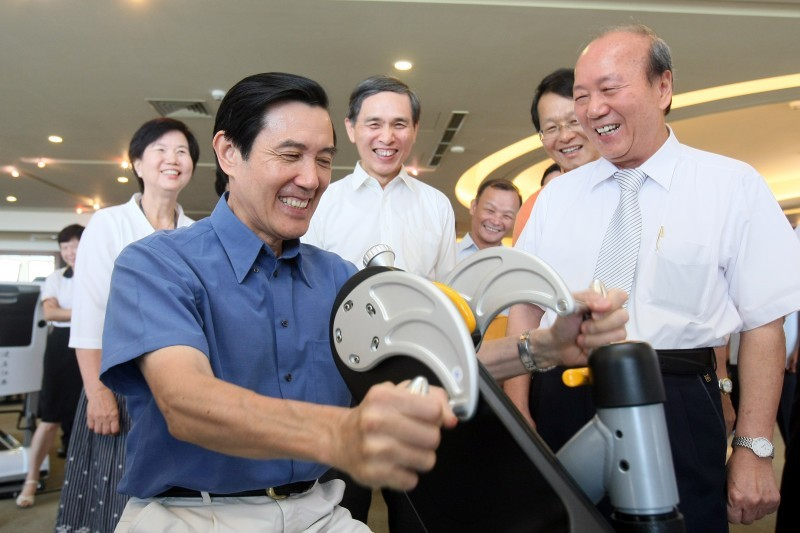
President Ma Ying-jeou of Taiwan visits Johnson Healthcare Corporation.

Johnson Health Tech. Co., Ltd. (JHT; Chinese: 喬山健康科技; pinyin: Qiáoshān Jiànkāng Kējì) is a multinational company engaged in the manufacturing and sale of exercise equipment. It is headquartered in Taichung, Taiwan. JHT's products include treadmills, stationary bicycles, elliptical trainers, weight training machines etc. The company has manufacturing plants in Shanghai and Taiwan, and R&D centers in Shanghai, Taiwan, and North America. It is the winner of two Taiwan Excellence Awards.

== Brands ==
The brands owned by Johnson Health Tech are:

- Johnson Fitness & Wellness: A Cottage Grove, Wisconsin-based personal fitness and wellness retailer that sells treadmills, ellipticals, exercise bikes, home gyms and accessories.
- Horizon Fitness: A Cottage Grove, Wisconsin-based company that manufactures treadmills, stationary bicycles, elliptical trainers for domestic use.
- Advanced Fitness Groups (AFG): Also a Cottage Grove, Wisconsin-based subsidiary that acts as a semi-exclusive name brand for Sears (in the United States) and Canadian Tire (in Canada)
- Matrix Fitness: A company that manufactures exercise equipment for commercial use. Launched in 2001, Matrix Fitness specializes in equipment for health clubs, luxury resorts, and athletic teams. Its products include cardiovascular, strength, and group training equipment. In 2016, the brand expanded into the home fitness market.
- Vision Fitness: A company that manufactures exercise equipment for domestic and commercial use.
- Bowflex
- Schwinn Fitness

JHT is present in the Indian market through contracts with Snap and Gold's Gym. In June 2010, it expanded its presence in the India by making a three-year contract with Talwalkars regarding the supply of gym equipments. Before June 2010, JHT's annual sale in India was 2 million USD. As of 2009, 7.5% of JHT's global revenue, amounting 23 million USD, comes from the Chinese market.

In 2024, Johnson Health Tech acquired Bowflex, Inc.

== Controversy ==
In August 2015, Johnson Health Tech was fined $3 million by the United States Consumer Product Safety Commission for failing to report defects in its Matrix Fitness Ascent and Elliptical trainers. The commission was not notified promptly of multiple reports of smoking, fires, and melted power components. Johnson Health Tech agreed to pay the fine but did not admit to the charges.

== See also ==
- Similar manufacturers of exercise equipment:
  - Concept2
  - NordicTrack
  - Peloton Interactive
