= Ally Love =

Ally Love may refer to:

- Ally Love (footballer) (born 1991), Scottish footballer
- Ally Love (sports host), American fitness instructor
