= JHT =

JHT may refer to:

- Johnson Health Tech, Taiwan
- JHT Kalajoki, a Finnish ice hockey team
- Johannes Hoff Thorup (born 1989), Danish football manager
