= Nautilus, Inc. v. Biosig Instruments, Inc. =

- Supreme Court of the United States

Argued April 24, 2014 Decided June 12, 2014
- Full case name: Nautilus, Inc. v. Biosig Instruments, Inc.
- Docket no.: 13-369
- Argument: Oral argument

Holding
- Patent claims are invalid as indefinite under 35 U.S.C. § 112 ¶ 2 when, in light of the specification and the prosecution history, they fail to inform, with reasonable certainty, those skilled in the art about the scope of the invention.

Court membership
- Chief Justice John Roberts Associate Justices Antonin Scalia · Anthony Kennedy; Clarence Thomas · Ruth Bader Ginsburg; Stephen Breyer · Samuel Alito; Sonia Sotomayor · Elena Kagan

Case opinion
- Majority: Ginsburg, joined by unanimous

Laws applied
- 35 U.S.C. § 112

Nautilus, Inc. v. Biosig Instruments, Inc., 134 S.Ct. 2120 (2014), was a 2014 decision by the United States Supreme Court pertaining to the interpretation (clarity, definiteness) of patent claims in U.S. patents. The opinion addressed the requirement contained in 35 U.S.C. § 112, ¶ 2 that a patent be "particularly pointing out and distinctly claiming the subject matter which the applicant regards as the invention." Writing for a unanimous court, Justice Ruth Bader Ginsburg held that a patent fails to comply with this requirement when the patent's claims, read in light of the specification and the prosecution history, "fail to inform, with reasonable certainty, those skilled in the art about the scope of the invention." Subsequent to the Court’s decision the case was remanded to the United States Court of Appeals for the Federal Circuit which, using the new standard, declined to invalidate Biosig's patent.

== Background ==
=== The '753 patent ===
In 1994, the United States Patent and Trademark Office awarded U.S. Patent No. 5,337,753 ("the '753 patent") to Dr. Gregory Lekhtman, who subsequently assigned his invention to Biosig Instruments, Inc. ("Biosig"). The '753 patent claimed as its invention an improved heart rate monitor that could filter out certain signals that distorted the accuracy of existing heart rate monitors. The invention used a "live electrode" to monitor the user's heart rate while using a "common electrode" to identify the signals that would need to be filtered out. Both sets of electrodes could be placed on the handlebar of an exercise machine, as depicted in Figures 1 and 7 from the '753 patent.

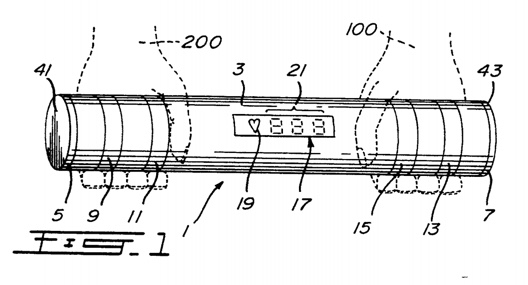
Figure 1 of the '753 patent

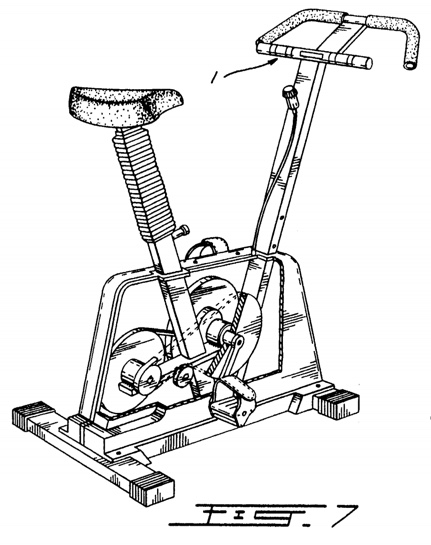
Figure 7 of the '753 patent

== Procedural history ==
In the late 1990s, Biosig disclosed its patented technology to StairMaster, a competing manufacturer of exercise machinery, and suggested that StairMaster should license its technology because its competing machines infringed on Biosig's patents. StairMaster declined and, in the early 2000s, Nautilus, Inc. ("Nautilus") acquired the StairMaster brand.

In 2004, Biosig sued Nautilus for patent infringement in the United States District Court for the Southern District of New York. In response, Nautilus asked the United States Patent and Trademark Office to reexamine the '753 patent to determine whether it had been properly issued. The Patent Office subsequently agreed to conduct the reexamination and the parties voluntarily dismissed the district court suit pending the outcome of the reexamination.

In 2010, the Patent Office issued a ruling that the '753 patent had been properly issued and the parties returned to the district court. In 2011, Judge Alvin Hellerstein held a claim construction hearing in which he interpreted the claims of the '753 patent. Relevant here, Judge Hellerstein held that the term "spaced relationship" meant that "'there is a defined relationship between the live electrode and the common electrode on one side of the cylindrical bar and the same or a different defined relationship between the live electrode and the common electrode on the other side of the cylindrical bar,' without any reference to the electrodes' width." In response to this construction, Nautilus moved for summary judgment of invalidity. Nautilus argued that because the term "spaced relationship" did not provide any guidance as to how far apart the electrodes should be, a person of ordinary skill in the art would not be able to determine where Biosig's invention began and ended and could not determine whether or not they were infringing the '753 patent. Thus, Nautilus argued, the '753 patent was invalid under 35 U.S.C. § 112 ¶ 2 for failing to "particular point out and distinctly claim" the invention. Judge Hellerstein agreed with Nautilus and ruled that because the term "spaced relationship" "'did not tell the court or anyone what precisely the space should be,' or even supply 'any parameters' for determining the appropriate spacing" the '753 patent failed to comply with 35 U.S.C. § 112 ¶ 2 and was indefinite.

In 2013, the United States Court of Appeals for the Federal Circuit reversed Judge Hellerstein's ruling. Considering the "spaced relationship" language, the Federal Circuit held that this language was not "insolubly ambiguous" because a person having ordinary skill in the art would understand that the electrodes would need to be spaced close enough that a user's hands would be able to touch both of them while also not being so close as to merge.

== Supreme Court decision ==
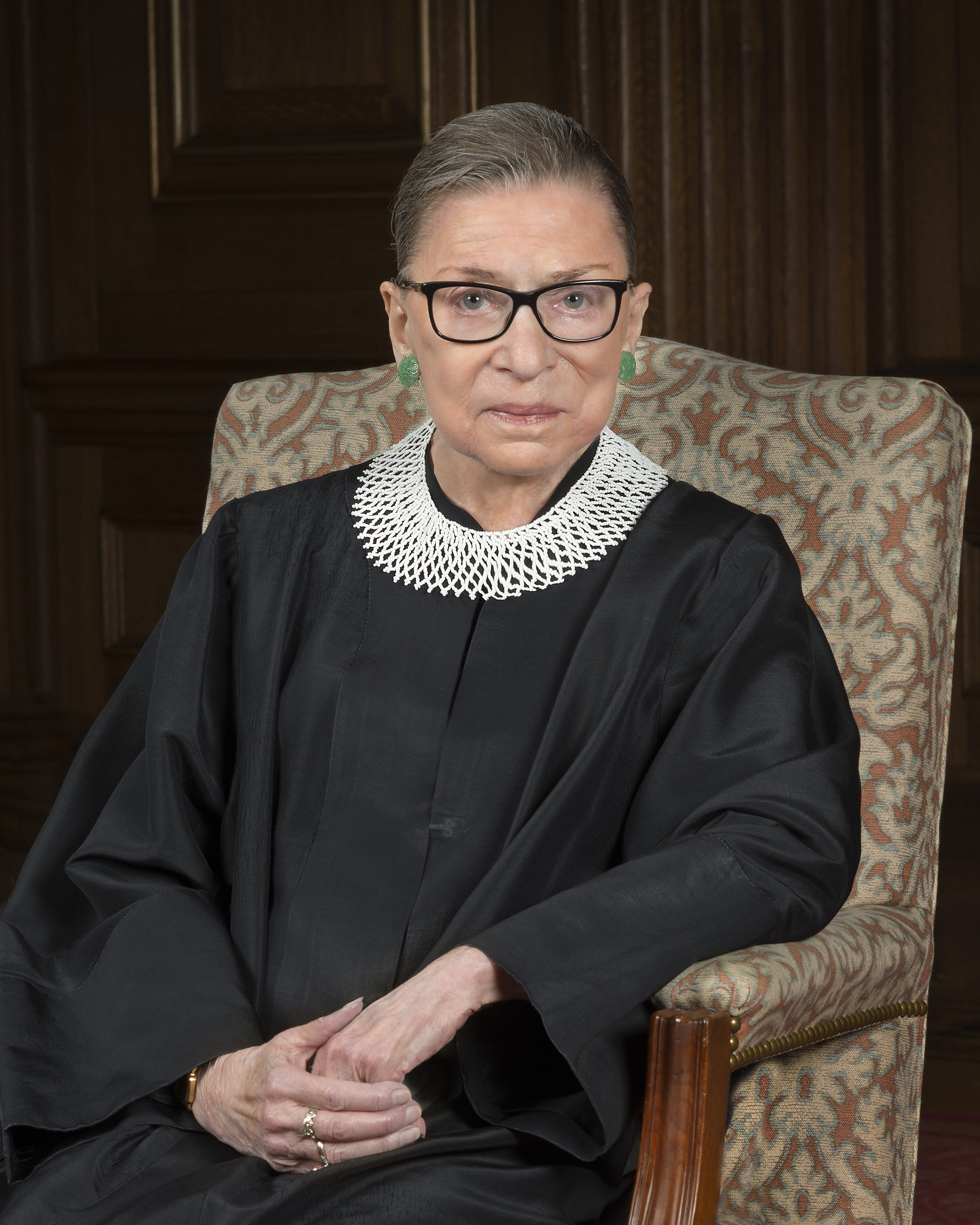
Justice Ginsburg delivered a unanimous decision for the Court.

Nautilus subsequently appealed the Federal Circuit's ruling to the Supreme Court. On January 10, 2014, the Supreme Court granted Nautilus's request for review and oral argument occurred on April 24, 2014. On June 12, 2014, the Court handed down its decision, which was a unanimous one written by Justice Ginsburg.

The Court first noted that 35 U.S.C. § 112 ¶ 2 requires patentees to "particularly point[] out and distinctly claim[] the subject matter which the applicant regards as [the] invention." The Court acknowledged that this requirement must strike a "delicate balance" between the "inherent limitations of language" and the expectation that the public have notice of what exactly falls within the scope of the patent so as to avoid a "zone of uncertainty" that deters lawful conduct. Recognizing this tension, the Court adopted the standard that a patent fails to comply with the requirements of 35 U.S.C. § 112 ¶ 2 when the patent's claims, read in light of the specification and the prosecution history, "fail to inform, with reasonable certainty, those skilled in the art about the scope of the invention."

The Court went on to reject the Federal Circuit's interpretation of Section 112, Paragraph 2 that had held that a claim was indefinite only if it was "insolubly ambiguous". The Court held that this standard imposed too loose of a standard for indefiniteness as "[i]t cannot be sufficient that a court can ascribe some meaning to a patent's claims; the definiteness inquiry trains on the understanding of a skilled artisan at the time of the patent application, not that of a court viewing matters post hoc." To allow such a loose standard would be to endorse the "zone of uncertainty" that the Court cautioned to avoid.

Recognizing that the decision announced a new standard for the indefiniteness analysis, the Court remanded the case for further proceedings by the lower courts in the first instance.

== Subsequent proceedings ==
On remand and applying the Supreme Court's new test for indefiniteness, the Federal Circuit again reversed the district court's finding of indefiniteness and remanded the case to the Southern District of New York. Nautilus subsequently sought en banc review and further Supreme Court review but both requests were denied.

== Reactions to the decision ==
Reaction to the Supreme Court's decision was mixed with some commentators suggesting that the decision would have limited impact while others hailed the Court's ruling as a new standard that would reshape the landscape on indefiniteness. Writing for Law360, Ryan Davis interviewed a number of attorneys who believed that the decision would make little practical difference, including one who called the Supreme Court's decision "the same standard by a different name". Ronald Mann of SCOTUSblog remarked that, while the decision did seem likely to push the Federal Circuit to raise the standard for definiteness, he "doubt[ed] that many members of the patent bar will find much of clarification in the Court’s opinion." Jason Rantanen at PatentlyO identified at least one post-Nautilus decision from the Federal Circuit that had, in his view correctly, held that "Nautilus changed the law of indefiniteness" and imposed a stricter standard. Other commentators similarly noted the impact that the decision had in expanding the range of indefiniteness challenges being brought by patent defendants.
