= Taiwan Excellence Awards =

- Symbol of Taiwan Excellence
- Awarded for: Winners who have qualified the criteria and are acknowledged by the judges.
- Location: Taipei
- Country: Taiwan
- First award: 1993
- Final award: 2026
- Website: https://www.taiwanexcellence.org/en

The Taiwan Excellence Awards are yearly awards given out by the Ministry of Economic Affairs (MOEA) and The Taiwan External Trade Development Council (TAITRA) to encourage Taiwan industries to upgrade and incorporate innovation and value into their products. The selection of awards is based on four criteria: R&D, design, quality, and marketing. Each product must score evenly in each category in order to be selected. An international panel of judges is invited to participate in this selection. Finalists are decided after several rounds of evaluations.

Several plans were launched to promote the product designs, qualities and images of Taiwan: The Quality Enhancement Plan (1988), Product Design Ability Enhancement Plan (1989), and the 1990 Image Enhancement Plan (IEP). This eventually led to the Branding Taiwan Project developed in 2006 with a strong focus on the IEP. The IEP is designed to enhance the image of Made in Taiwan products. There have been three iterations to the competition:

- Stage one (1990–1995): Focus on improving the negative image of Made In Taiwan products.
- Stage two (1995–2000): Innovalue ("innovation" plus "added value"), was created.
- Stage three (current stage): Image reformation of Made In Taiwan products through an integrated global information campaign.

The objective is to transform Taiwan from a regional manufacturing center into a global R&D and innovation center.

== Type of Awards ==
Taiwan Excellence Awards. Judges select the products which are authorized to display the symbol of Taiwan Excellence attached with the winning year.
Silver Awards. Judges elect up to 30 finalists from the Taiwan Excellence Award winners for screening. After the gold winners are selected, the remaining are awarded with the Silver Awards.
Gold Awards. A maximum of eight products may be awarded with the Gold Award.
Taiwan Excellence for Best Performance. An award that is delivered to the corporation who won the most Taiwan Excellence Awards for the year.
Taiwan Excellence Achievement Awards. Presented to the companies who have earned at least 50 Taiwan Excellence Awards during the past years.
Popularity Award. The public participates in the nomination of the 30 finalists and the most popular product is awarded.

== 2008 Taiwan Excellence Award Winners ==
Gold Awards (8)
Silver Awards (21)
Certificates for Taiwan Excellence (112)
Taiwan Excellence for Best Performance (1)
Taiwan Excellence Achievement Award (2)
Popularity Award (1)

== 2009 Taiwan Excellence Award Winners ==
Gold Award Winners List (8):
Eee PC S101 -ASUSTeK Computer Inc.
City Speed -Giant Manufacturing Co., Ltd.
Touch Diamond -High Tech Computer Corp.
Energy Conservation Driving Module -Hiwin Technologies Corp.
Pico Pocket Projector -Optoma Corp.
WorldCard -Penpower Technology Ltd.
Ratcheting Adjustable Wrench -Proxene Tools Co., Ltd.
Rice Cooker -Tatung Co.

Silver Award Winners List (22):
PocketCinema -AIPTEK International Inc.
3.5G Super Performance PDA Phone -ASUSTeK Computer Inc.
Bamboo Series Notebook Bamboo -ASUSTeK Computer Inc.
Short-Throw Gaming Projector -BenQ Corp.
19-inch Wide Panel -Chi Mei Optoelectronics Corp.
Taiwan Blue Magpie Collection -Franz Collection Inc.
TCR Advanced SL TCR Advanced -Giant Manufacturing Co., Ltd.
Linear Motor Air Bearing Platform -Hiwin Mikrosystem Corp.
Treadmill - Johnson Health Tech. Co., Ltd.
Functional Trainer - Johnson Health Tech. Co., Ltd.
Vertical Machining Center -Kao Fong Machinery Co., Ltd.
Jockey G5 125/150 -Kwang Yang Industry Co., Ltd.
Solargizer leading desktop combo -KYE Systems Corp.(Genius)
Full suspension MTB – One Five O -Mérida Industry Co., Ltd.
Elixir DDR3 SODIMM series -Nanya Technology Corporation
Pacific IF -Pacific Cycles, Inc.
Refrigerator -Panasonic Taiwan Co., Ltd.
All Terrain Vehicle (ATV) -Taiwan Golden Bee Co., Ltd.
Fine Arts Counter Top Gas Hobs -Taiwan Sakura Corporation
Fine Arts Chimney Range Hood -Taiwan Sakura Corp.
Dual-Band Wireless-N Router -ZyXEL Communications Corp.
WiMAX Indoor Femto Base Station -ZyXEL Communications Corp.

== 2024 Taiwan Excellence Award Winners ==
K51L-SWRH | Mechanical Adjustable Swing Clear Hinge - Waterson Corporation

== See also ==
- Made in Taiwan
