= StairMaster =

American exercise equipment company

- StairMaster logo
- Type: Private
- Industry: fitness equipment
- Founded: 1983 in Tulsa, Oklahoma
- Headquarters: Vancouver, Washington, US
- Key people: Lanny Potts, Jim Walker, and George Schupp Brent Teal, CTO
- Owner: Tri-Tech, Inc
- Website: StairMaster website StairMaster website StairMaster website

StairMaster is an American company specializing in the design and production of fitness equipment. They sell cardiovascular and strength equipment such as stair climbing machines, TreadClimber cardio machines and dumbbell sets. The Stairmaster was so widely used that people referred to nearly all other brands of step climbers as StairMasters.

== History ==
StairMaster was founded by Lanny Potts, Jim Walker, and George Schupp and launched by Tri-Tech, Inc. of Tulsa, Oklahoma in 1983 at the National Sporting Goods Association trade show. The first piece of equipment, StairMaster 5000, was a rotating staircase machine. In March 1984 the StairMaster 5000 was replaced with the StairMaster 6000. Mechanically the StairMaster 6000 was virtually identical to its predecessor, but the 6000 displayed workout information on a digital screen. The StairMaster 4000 was developed next, and featured adjustable pedals to simulate stairs.

The Stairmaster was patented in 1987 and soon after other companies offered versions of stair type exercise equipment. In 1991 StairMaster Exercise Systems, sued Temecula, California based Tru-Trac Therapy Products Inc. who made the "Aero-Step" alleging that their 1987 patent was infringed upon. In 1989, the StairMaster 4000 was the company's most popular model, which Aron Kahn of the Ottawa Citizen attributed to its affordability and implementation of positive reinforcement through an on-screen display of goals and congratulatory messages. The company developed another piece of exercise equipment in 1987, when it released the Gravitron, which focused on muscles in the upper body. It quickly became popular among gym-goers, although Karen Avenso of New York Daily News noted that it "[looked] more intimidating - and harder to program - than a VCR.

In 1992, Tri-Tech Inc. merged with Randal Sports / Medical Products. After this point, the company begin doing business as Stairmaster Sports / Medical Products. The company was then sold to Gardenway, Inc. in 1995, who subsequently sold it to Rutledge Partners, a private equity fund, in 1997.

The company was acquired by Nautilus, Inc., the owner of Bowflex and Schwinn Bicycle Company, in 2002 as part of Nautilus' expansion in the late 1990s and early 2000s. Nautilus was affected by the Great Recession in the United States, losing almost $225 million in revenue between 2007 and 2010. As a result, Nautilus sold the Stairmaster brand to Core Health and Fitness in 2009, as its stock reached its lowest point.

A 2016 Wall Street Journal article titled: "A Tougher Workout Than a StairMaster: The Stepmill" stated that many gyms were replacing their Stairmasters with a machine called a "Stepmill". The article went on to state that the Ecofit Company compiled data from 967 fitness centers and determined that Stepmills were being used 18 times as often as Stairmasters. People were seeking a workout that was both shorter and tougher. Stairmaster now manufactures their own stepmill product which they named "The Gauntlet".

== Product timeline ==
StepMill

- 1983 – StairMaster 5000
- 1984 – StairMaster 6000
- 1988 – Gauntlet
- 1991 – StepMill 7000PT
- 2008 – StepMill 916 (SM916)
- 2011 – StepMill 5 (SM5)
- 2012 – StepMill 3 (SM3)

StairClimber

- 1986 – StairMaster 4000 PT
- 1998 – StairMaster 4400 PT & CL
- 1999 - StairMaster 4600 PT & CL
- 2008 – StairClimber 916 (SC916)
- 2011 – StairClimber 5 (SC5)

Gravitron

- 1989 – Gravitron 8000
- 1997 – Gravitron 2000 AT

Additional products

- 2011 – TwistLock Dumbbells
- 2013 – TreadClimber
