= Becs Gentry =

British coach and elite runner

Rebecca "Becs" Gentry (born 27 March 1986) is a Peloton instructor and leading British marathon runner based in New York City.

== Early life ==
Gentry grew up in Worcester, United Kingdom and was involved in athletics and cross country during school. Although she did not run during University, Gentry took up running in 2011 as a way to destress from her career in public relations.

== Coaching career ==
Gentry started her career as a running coach in the United Kingdom and became a Nike+ Run Club Coach in London. Gentry moved to New York City in 2019 to join Peloton as a Tread specialist. Together with Robin Arzon, she developed an 18-week marathon training program for the Peloton app. In this role, she has become a globally recognized trainer and face of the Peloton brand, partnering on initiatives with celebrities including Ashton Kutcher.

== Running career ==
Gentry is a long distance runner and has competed in marathon and ultramarathon races. She ran 2:37:01 to finish first female (non-elite) in the 2019 New York City Marathon. In March 2021, Gentry was invited to participate in the Olympic Marathon Trials for Team Great Britain. Gentry placed fourth in the trials with a time of 2:32:01.
