= The Love Patient =

- Film poster
- Directed by: Michael Simon
- Written by: Michael Simon
- Produced by: Michael Simon; Maria Montgomery
- Starring: Benjamin Lutz; John Werskey; Jackson Palmer; Madison Gray; Mike Pfaff; Laura Ulsh
- Cinematography: Christopher S. Walters
- Edited by: Bob Poirier
- Music by: Don Barrett
- Production company: Passion Fruit Productions
- Distributed by: TLA Releasing
- Release date: May 6, 2011
- Running time: 95 minutes
- Country: United States
- Language: English

The Love Patient is a 2011 gay-themed romantic comedy written and directed by Michael Simon, released to festivals in 2011, and on DVD in 2012.

== Plot ==
Paul (Benjamin Lutz), a professional ad executive, is suffering and feeling nostalgic about his former relationship with Brad (John Werskey), a whole year after their breakup. Paul is not used to losing, is self-involved, and is too haughty to go crawling back to his ex asking for a second chance; hence, he comes up with an elaborate plan to win Brad's pity, affection, and love. Brad has since moved on and is now dating a bisexual former Bowflex model called Ted (Jackson Palmer).

Paul helps bail out his doctor Burt Halper (Mike Pfaff), out of a financial strain, on the condition that he diagnoses Paul with cancer and prescribes a fake treatment. Word is conveniently spread to Brad, who reacts by coming to care for his ex. However, Paul's antics are too good; even his mother moves in, turning his apartment into a makeshift hospital. Trouble brews when his snoopy sister tags along and soon starts to notice that something is amiss. Paul soon finds himself deep in the situation without any hope of controlling it, especially when it comes to his unpredictable sister.

All his plans unravel when Brad's new boyfriend, Ted, is successfully seduced by his sister and whispers of Paul's fake cancer to Brad as she breaks the dual. Brad is distraught and feels played and manipulated but is quickly comforted by the now healed Paul. The two find themselves too intertwined since their meeting broke up their cordial relation.

== Cast ==
- Benjamin Lutz as Paul
- John Werskey as Brad
- Jackson Palmer as Ted
- Madison Gray as Stephanie
- Mike Pfaff as Dr. Burt Halper
- Laura Ulsh as Esther
- John Kilpatrick as Walter
- Oto Brezina as Dante
- Marc Raymond as Mr. Miller
- Annette Remter as Debra
- Sherena Rupan as Sanjin
- Alicia Seymour as Susan Halper
- Michael Simon as Mr. Lowenthal
- Jerry TerHorst as Gabe
- Aaron Farkas as Jonathon
- Jeremy Herzig as Billy
- Andrew Miller as Jack
- Anabelle D. Munro as Earth
- Denis O'Mahoney as Dr. Halper Sr.
- Tommy Evan Lee as Waiter
- Theo Mondle as Drummer
- Tara Ciabattoni as Account Executive
- Tyler McClain as Actress in Commercial
- Hunter G. Williams as Actor in Commercial
