= Gym Source =

American fitness equipment retailer

Gym Source is a distributor of residential and commercial fitness equipment in the United States with 31 stores locations in 13 states. The company was founded in 1937 and is headquartered in New York City.

== Overview ==
Gym Source is the United States' largest distributor of fitness equipment. Opened in 1937 as Cutler Owens Sporting Goods in Midtown Manhattan, Richard Miller purchased the company in 1978, renaming it Gym Source. The privately held company employs about 300 people in 10 states and operates through seven distribution centers. As a fitness equipment retailer, Gym Source serves customers in all 50 states and 47 countries. As of 2014, the firm serves more than 300,000 customers internationally and has made nearly 2 million deliveries, making it the largest fitness equipment distributor in the United States.

=== Brands ===
Gym Source major brand includes Precor, Cybex International, Hampton Fitness, Hoist Equipment, Octane Fitness, Polar USA, Power Plate, Tuff Stuff, Schwinn Fitness, Stairmaster, Star Trac and TRUE Fitness.

== History ==
In 1937, Al Owens and Murray Cutler founded a sporting goods store called Cutler Owens. They opened their first 900 sq. ft. store in Rockefeller Center in Midtown Manhattan. In 1974, Richard Miller joined the company and redirected the store's focus toward running and tennis gear.

By 1977, Cutler Owens was a top-ranked tennis shop, and 20% of New York marathon runners reportedly purchased their shoes from the sporting goods store. In 1978, Richard Miller acquired Cutler Owens and transformed it into a full-service fitness equipment distributor and rebranded the company as Gym Source. In 1979, he moved to bigger location in Midtown in order to accommodate more exercise equipment.

In 1985, the company focused on the commercial arena and by late 1986, it had secured enough business from premium commercial accounts including commercial fitness facilities, college and university fitness centers, and training rooms for professional sports teams.

In 1995, Gym Source was the third-largest distributor of Life Fitness equipment in the country. By 2012, the company had nearly $100 million in revenue and gained exclusivity contracts with fitness equipment manufacturers.

In 2012 Gym Source was named the exclusive East Coast distributor of BILT by Agassi and Reyes athletic training equipment. In 2014, the company was tapped as the exclusive East Coast distributor of the FreeCross outdoor elliptical trainer.

In 2024, Fitnessmith acquired the USA commercial equipment, maintenance, and service divisions of the company.
