= Tor Håkon Jackson Inderberg =

Norwegian political scientist

Tor Håkon Jackson Inderberg (born 1977) is a Norwegian political scientist and a Senior Research Fellow at the Fridtjof Nansen Institute in Lysaker, Norway. He holds a Master's degree from the Norwegian University of Science and Technology in Trondheim, and a PhD from the University of Oslo. His PhD thesis (2012) focused on the climate change adaptation and governance of electricity sectors in Norway and Sweden.

Jackson Inderberg has been with the Fridtjof Nansen Institute since 2007 and has also been a Guest Researcher at the Centre for Sustainability (CSAFE) at the University of Otago, New Zealand. He has published extensively on issues related to energy systems, renewable energy policies and climate change policies.

From 2013 to 2018, Jackson Inderberg was vice president for Norway's canoe federation.

== Selection of recent publications ==
- Policy styles, opportunity structures and proportionality: Comparing renewable electricity policies in the UK. Merethe Dotterud leiren, Tor Håkon Jackson Inderberg and Tim Rayner. International Political Science Review, published online 22.04.2020, 15 p.
- What shapes municipalities' perceptions of fairness in windpower developments? Inger-Lise Saglie, Tor Håkon Inderberg and Helga Rognstad. Local Environment, published online 19.01.2020, 15 p.
- Changing the record: Narrative policy analysis and the politics of emissions trading in New Zealand. Tor Håkon Jackson Inderberg and Ian Bailey. Environmental Policy and Governance, published online 16.08.2019, 19 p.
- Who influences windpower licensing decisions in Norway? Formal requirements and informal practices. Tor Håkon Jackson Inderberg, Helga Rognstad, Inger-Lise Saglie and Lars H. Gulbrandsen. Energy Research & Social Science, Vol 52, 2019, pp. 181–191.
- Is there a Prosumer Pathway? Exploring household solar energy development in Germany, Norway, and the United Kingdom. Tor Håkon Jackson; Inderberg, Kerstin Tews and Britta Turner. Energy Research & Social Science, Vol 42, 2018, pp. 258–269.
- Designing New Zealand's Emissions Trading Scheme. Tor Håkon Jackson Inderberg, Ian Bailey and Nichola Harmer. Global Environmental Politics, Vol 17, No 3, 2017, pp. 31–50
