= BowFlex, Inc. =

American fitness equipment company

- Type: Public
- Traded as: OTC Pink: BFXXQ; NYSE: BFX
- Industry: Exercise equipment
- Founded: 1986
- Fate: Bankruptcy
- Headquarters: Vancouver, WA
- Key people: James "Jim" Barr IV (CEO); Aina E. Konold (CFO)
- Revenue: ▼US$309.29 million (2019)
- Operating income: ▼US$−28.54 million (2019)
- Net income: ▼US$−92.8 million (2019)
- Total assets: ▼US$220.48 million (2019)
- Total equity: ▼US$90.6 million (2019)
- Number of employees: 434 (2020)
- Website: bowflex.com

BowFlex, Inc., formerly Nautilus, Inc., located in Vancouver, Washington, United States, was the American worldwide marketer, developer, and manufacturer of fitness equipment brands Bowflex, Schwinn, and JRNY, its adaptive fitness platform. The company changed its corporate name from Nautilus, Inc. to BowFlex, Inc. in 2023. BowFlex Inc. was a publicly traded company listed on the OTC Markets Group as BFXXQ, and formerly on the New York Stock Exchange. The company's products are sold globally to customers through e-commerce, call centers, and retail stores.

== Organization ==
BowFlex was the maker of fitness equipment brands BowFlex, Schwinn, and JRNY, its adaptive fitness platform.

In 2015, the company opened a new building across from its headquarters in Vancouver, Washington, United States for its development and research teams. The company also has offices in China and Rotterdam, and distribution centers in Portland, Oregon and Columbus, Ohio.

James “Jim” Barr IV was named CEO in July 2019. The company's executive leadership team also included Aina Konold (Chief Financial Officer), Becky Alseth (Chief Marketing Officer), Chris Quatrochi (Chief Product Officer), John Goelz (Chief Operating Officer), and Alan Chan (Chief Legal & People Officer).

== History ==
Nautilus, Inc. originated in 1986 with the sale of most of the company by the inventor of Nautilus machines, Arthur Jones. Jones created the Nautilus machine, then called the Blue Monster, in the late 1960s, with the purpose of developing a fitness machine that accommodates human movement. The company's name was changed to Nautilus because the logarithmic-spiral cam, which made the machine a success, resembled a nautilus.

BowFlex acquired Nautilus, Inc. and specialized in designing, developing and marketing strength and cardio fitness products. In 1998, the company changed its name to Direct Focus and acquired the Nautilus, Schwinn and StairMaster brands between 1999 and 2002, before eventually changing its name to Nautilus, Inc. in 2005. Nautilus became a publicly traded company on the U.S. stock exchange in May 1999.

The company stopped selling exercise equipment to gyms in 2011 and shifted its focus to home-use equipment. The same year, Nautilus. licensed its brand name and technology to other manufacturers.

In 2004, Nautilus was sued by Biosig Instruments for allegedly infringing its design for heart-rate monitors. The case eventually reached the United States Supreme Court, who used it to establish reasonable certainty as the standard for judging whether or not a patent claim was indefinite.

Nautilus acquired Octane Fitness, LLC from private equity firm North Castle Partners on December 31, 2015.

The company was recognized by The Oregonian as one of the top places to work, as well as the company with the healthiest employees of Oregon by the Portland Business Journal, in its 100-499 employee category.

Nautilus has been awarded as an American Heart Association Fit-Friendly company.

On November 1, 2023, Nautilus, Inc. changed its name to BowFlex, Inc.

On March 5, 2024, BowFlex filed for bankruptcy. The bankruptcy resulted in Johnson Health Tech acquiring the BowFlex, Schwinn, and JRNY brands.

== Brands and products ==
The BowFlex Inc. portfolio included global fitness equipment brands BowFlex, Schwinn Fitness, and JRNY.

=== BowFlex ===
BowFlex is the brand name for cardio and strength fitness training equipment. The first BowFlex product, BowFlex 2000X home gym, was created in 1986. BowFlex products now range from cardio machines, to adjustable dumbbells and home gyms. The BowFlex brand includes the BowFlex Max Trainer, the SelectTech Adjustable dumbbells for strength training, and BowFlex Xtreme 2 home gym and BowFlex Revolution home gym. The brand also makes treadmills, elliptical machines, and indoor cycling bikes.

=== Schwinn ===
The Schwinn brand included cardio products.

In addition to upright and indoor cycling bikes, the Schwinn brand also includes treadmills and rowing machines, as well as the vintage styled Schwinn Classic Cruwaser bike with a digital app.

=== JRNY ===
The JRNY adaptive fitness membership offers cardio, strength and whole-body workouts.

== See also ==
- Similar manufacturers of exercise equipment:
  - Concept2
  - NordicTrack
  - Peloton Interactive
