= Coretronic =

Taiwanese electronics manufacturer

Coretronic Corporation
- Native name: 中強光電股份有限公司
- Type: Public company
- Traded as: TPEx: 5371
- Industry: Electronics
- Founded: Hsinchu Science Park, Hsinchu, Taiwan (1992; 34 years ago)
- Founder: Wade Chang
- Headquarters: Hsinchu Science Park, Taiwan
- Area served: Worldwide
- Key people: Wade Chang (Chairman); Sarah Lin (President)
- Products: DLP projectors; Interactive Projection System; Immersive Curve Touch System; Image Signal Processing Box; Projection Module; PoE Power Supply; Wearable Display; Spectrometer; Light Guide Plate(LGP); LCD Backlight Module; Optical Component; Seamless Display; Ultra Slim Dual Display; Touch Module; Industrial and Medical Display; Medical Examination Appliance
- Brands: Optoma
- Revenue: NT$39.57 billion (2025)
- Net income: NT$357 million (2025)
- Number of employees: 4,143 (December 31, 2025)
- Website: www.coretronic.com/en

Coretronic Corporation (Coretronic; Chinese: 中強光電股份有限公司) is a Taiwanese electronics and manufacturing company. Founded in Hsinchu Science Park on June 30, 1992, Coretronic is the largest Taiwanese manufacturer of the DLP projector, interactive projection system, image signal processing box, projection module, LCD backlight module, touch module, and the industrial and medical LCD.

== History ==
Developing and manufacturing of LCDs began in 1993. In 1995, Nano Precision was established to manufacture LGP (Light Guide Plate) for LCD backlight modules. Coretronic became a listed company on the Taipei Exchange (GTSM: 5371) in 1999.

CORE-FLEX OPTICAL (Suzhou) was established in 2006 to manufacture components for LCD modules and optical devices. YOUNG Optics became a listed company on Taiwan Stock Exchange (TWSE: 3504). In 2007, and both Suzhou Nano Display and Coretronic (Guangzhou) were established to manufacture LCD backlight modules.

In 2008, Guangzhou Nano Display and Nano Precision (Nanjing) both were established to manufacture LCD backlight modules. Coretronic Display Solution was established in 2008 as well to manufacture digital information display products and niche and medical displays.

Coretronic System Engineering was established to provide integrated imaging system products and services in 2010. Also, Coretronic Culture and Arts Foundation (CCAF) was founded, and Coretronics joint ventured with Japan's Gunze Limited to establish YLG Optotech Limited to manufacture capacitive touch panels. 2011 saw Coretronic Venture Capital established to make investments. Young Lighting, Nano Precision, and Coretronic Display Solution were merged into Young Lighting in 2012, and in 2014, Coretronic Display (Suzhou) was established to consistently produce customized LCD module products.

Coretronic Optotech (Suzhou) was established in 2015 to manufacture LCD backlight modules, LCD TVs, and new flat panel displays. Coretronic was honored 2015 Innovative Product Awards from Hsinchu Science Park Bureau, Ministry of Science and Technology. Coretronic has been honorably ranked in the top 5% in the Corporate Governance Evaluation from Taiwan Stock Exchange (TWSE) for the 2nd consecutive year in 2016. Coretronic was also honored at the 2016 Innovative Product Awards from Hsinchu Science Park Bureau, Ministry of Science and Technology.

WaveOptics partnered with Coretronic on an AR developer program in 2018. Also, Coretronic ranked in the top 5% in the Corporate Governance Evaluation from the Taiwan Stock Exchange (TWSE) for the 4th consecutive year in 2018, and Nano Precision Taiwan Limited was established. Both Coretronic MEMS Corp. and Coretronic Reality Incorporation (CRI) were established in 2019. Coretronic Vietnam Company Limited was founded in 2020, and Coretronic Intelligent Logistics Solutions Corporation (CiLS) was established in 2021.

== Shareholding and subsidiaries ==
- Coretronic Corporation
- Young Optics Incorporation
- Optoma Technology Corporation
- Young Green Energy Corporation
- uCare Medical Electronics Corporation
- Calibre UK Limited
- Coretronic Intelligent Cloud Service Corporation
- Coretronic Intelligent Robotics Corporation
- InnoSpectra Corporation
- Coretronic MEMS Corporation
- Coretronic Intelligent Logistics Solutions Corporation
- Coretronic Culture and Arts Foundation

== See also ==
- List of companies of Taiwan
- List of semiconductor fabrication plants
