= Emma Lovewell =

American fitness instructor

Emma Lovewell is an American fitness instructor and book author. She is best known for being an instructor for Peloton, where she began teaching classes in 2017.

== Personal life ==
Lovewell was raised on Martha's Vineyard. Her parents are Mark Lovewell, a writer and photographer for the Vineyard Gazette, and Teresa Yuan, an artist and gardener from Taiwan.

Lovewell graduated from University of Massachusetts Amherst. She currently lives in New York. In 2023, she became engaged to Dave Clark.

== Career ==
After college, Lovewell moved to New York City as a professional dancer and performed with such artists as Snoop Dogg, Björk, and the Rolling Stones. She also signed as a model with Wilhelmina Models and spent time working as a personal trainer and group fitness instructor at Soulcycle. She also spent a brief time working for her mother's gardening business when Yuan was diagnosed with cancer.

In 2012, she landed an acting gig for Peloton's kickstarter campaign. In 2017, she began working for Peloton full-time as a fitness instructor.

Lovewell has partnered with a number of brands. In 2021, Lovewell collaborated with Sene to create a line of custom jeans. In 2022, she partnered with Kite Hill Brands to work on a plant-based food campaign. In 2023, she worked with Unilever on a scalp-care brand. She used to be a sponsored athlete for both Under Armour and Hydrant.

In 2023, she published a memoir titled "Live Learn Love Well: Lessons from a Life of Progress Not Perfection".
