= John Foley (executive) =

American businessman (born 1971)

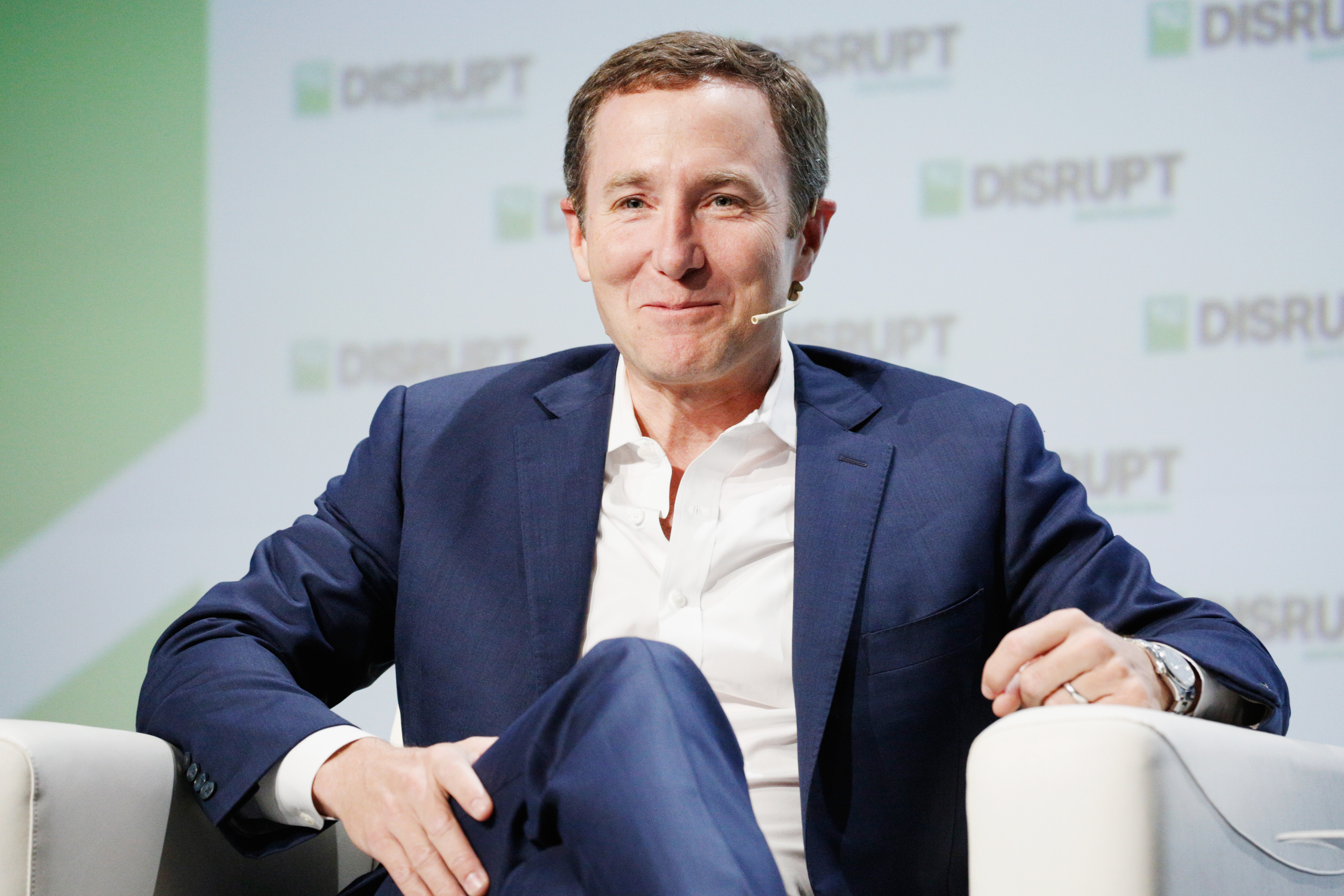
- Foley in 2018
- Born: 1971 (age 54–55); Houston, Texas, US
- Education: Georgia Tech; Harvard Business School
- Known for: Founder of Peloton Interactive
- Spouse: Jill Foley
- Children: 2

John Foley (born 1971) is an American former billionaire and business executive who co-founded Peloton in 2012 and Ernesta in 2023.

== Biography ==
Foley was born in Houston, Texas, in 1971, and grew up in Key Largo, Florida. He received the Bachelor of Science in Industrial Engineering from Georgia Tech and the Master of Business Administration from the Harvard Business School. During university, he paid for his tuition by working at a Skittles factory.

=== Barnes & Noble ===
Before founding Peloton, he served as a president of Barnes & Noble.

=== Peloton ===
Foley co-founded Peloton in 2012. The company went public in 2019, and he had a net worth of approximately $1.9 billion in 2021. As Peloton began to experience financial difficulties related to the COVID-19 pandemic, his net worth declined to approximately $225 million in November 2022. He left the company that year as it underwent a restructuring.

After leaving Peloton, Foley founded Ernesta, an online rug company that ships samples to customers. It was cofounded with Hisao Kushi and Yony Feng, both of whom also cofounded Peloton. The company launched in 2023, operating in New York, Texas, Florida and Illinois.

== Personal life ==
Foley lives in the West Village neighbourhood of Manhattan with his wife Jill and their two children, a son and a daughter.
