= Nick Caldwell =

American technology executive

Nicholas Caldwell is an American technology executive who is currently chief product officer at Peloton Interactive. He has led product teams and served on the boards of several Silicon Valley companies, including Hubspot, Microsoft, Reddit, and Twitter, and is a leader in efforts to increase the number and visibility of executives of color in Silicon Valley. In 2022, he resigned from Twitter following Elon Musk's acquisition of the company and later sued the company and Musk for breach of contract in relation to owed severance pay.

== Education ==
Caldwell grew up in Maryland in a predominantly black neighborhood. He graduated from MIT in 2003 with a BSc in electrical engineering & computer science. In 2015, he earned an MBA from Berkeley Haas in their evening and weekend program.

== Career ==
After graduating from MIT in 2003, Caldwell became a software engineer at Microsoft. He was previously an intern on the speech and natural language group starting in 2021. He eventually stayed at the company for 15 years and became the GM of the Power BI product organization. In an InfoWorld interview, he stated that he stayed at Microsoft "too long" instead of taking on new opportunities because of the safety net it provided before realizing that his skills and abilities were all he needed.

In 2016, he left Microsoft to take on the Vice President of Engineering role at Reddit. During his time at Reddit, the company's engineering team grew from 35 to over 250 engineers. In 2018, he left Reddit and joined Looker as chief product and engineering officer. While at Looker, he became involved in helping tech leaders of color move into leadership. He stayed at the company until its acquisition by Google in 2020 and became a senior director at Google following the acquisition.

In 2020, he joined Twitter as VP of Engineering, Consumer in 2020 and was promoted to General Manager of Core Technologies in 2021. He also joined Hubspot's board of directors in 2021.

On October 28, 2022, Caldwell resigned from Twitter immediately following Elon Musk's acquisition of the company. In April 2024, he sued Musk and X (formerly known as Twitter) for unpaid severance with his lawyers claiming $19.3 million in unpaid owed plus interest.

In September 2023, he was named the chief product officer of Peloton Interactive. In 2025, he led the release of a new cross training series of hardware.
