= Bowflex =

Brand of exercise equipment

BowFlex
- Logo used since 2023
- Product type: Fitness equipment
- Current owner: Johnson Health Tech
- Country: United States
- Introduced: 1986
- Website: bowflex.com

BowFlex is the brand name for a series of fitness training equipment, marketed and sold by Johnson Health Tech. Based in Vancouver, Washington, the company sells its products through direct, retail, and international channels. The first BowFlex product, BowFlex 2000X, was created in 1986. BowFlex products now range from cardio machines, adjustable dumbbells, and home gyms.

== History ==
The BowFlex grew out of a now-expired patent first conceived by an Ethiopian engineering student in the United States, named Tessema Dosho Shifferaw. BowFlex of America, Inc. began marketing the first product, BowFlex 2000X in 1986. Instead of conventional weights or pulley machines, the original BowFlex machine used a combination of polymer rods to create constant resistance or tension.

BowFlex of America merged with Stratford Software Corporation, USA in 1993 and changed its name to BowFlex, Inc. It became a public company on the Toronto Stock Exchange. In 1998, the company changed its name to Direct Focus, Inc. and initiated an IPO on Nasdaq. With the success of BowFlex, the company bought Nautilus International, Inc., Schwinn Fitness, and Stairmaster. In 2002, the company moved to the NYSE and renamed itself The Nautilus Group, then Nautilus, Inc.

The company changed its name from Nautilus, Inc. to BowFlex Inc. and refreshed the BowFlex® brand identity in 2023.

In March 2024, BowFlex declared Chapter 11 bankruptcy, citing poor post-COVID sales for its collapse. Taiwan-based Johnson Health Tech purchased the company for $37.5 million after approval from the bankruptcy court in April 2024.

== Recalls ==
On January 29, 2004, about 420,000 BowFlex machines were recalled due to mechanical problems. In November 2004, there was a recall of nearly 800,000 (680,000 Power Pro units and 102,000 Ultimate units) BowFlex machines after reports that several models had broken unexpectedly. The Consumer Product Safety Commission said that the seats could unexpectedly break and that the backboard bench could collapse when in the incline position on the Power Pro model. This recall was voluntary and the company offered every purchaser a free safety repair kit.

In March 2006, about 17,000 BowFlex Ultimate 2's were recalled due to problems. In December 2007 about 68,000 home gyms were recalled. In March 2009, about 78,000 BowFlex Ultimate 2's were recalled due to problems with the horizontal seat rail.

== See also ==
- NASA spinoff technologies § Bowflex Revolution
