= Communications Specification for Fitness Equipment =

Communications Specification for Fitness Equipment (CSAFE) is a fitness industry-wide communications specification developed in 1997 for exercise equipment. As this specification was originally developed by the company FitLinxx, sometimes it is also referred to as FitLinxx.

== Purpose ==
The CSAFE specification describes the physical wiring scheme as well as the format of the data frames. The CSAFE protocol is designed to work in a master/slave fashion. A special I/O jack on the exercise equipment accepts a normal 8P8C (RJ-45) plug (although the wiring scheme has no relation to Ethernet) wired to a normal RS-232 cable. The CSAFE port also has pins which should be wired to an input audio jack.

== Development ==
In October, 2000, a CSAFE group was formed within FISA (Fitness Industry Suppliers Association) to help coordinate the continued evolution of CSAFE. This group is led by a steering committee with membership from a broad representation of the industry. The CSAFE protocol is licensed on a royalty free basis to any company, person, or organization wishing to use it.

== Wiring Scheme ==
Most of the pins from the RJ-45 plug should be connected to a normal RS-232 interface configured for an asynchronous communication mode of 9600 baud with 8 data bits, 1 stop bits and no parity. Hardware handshaking for flow control (CTS as an input to Slave) is not required to support this protocol but is recommended. The equipment jack pinout for this jack is as follows:

CSAFE cable pinout
| Pin | Description | Fitness equipment (slave) I/O |
|---|---|---|
| 1. | Audio left | Input |
| 2. | Audio right | Input |
| 3. | Rx | Input |
| 4. | Tx | Output |
| 5. | Voltage source | Output |
| 6. | CTS flow control | Input |
| 7. | Signal ground | N/A |
| 8. | Shield | N/A |

Pin positions are counted from 1 to 8 in a left to right direction looking into the RJ-45 socket with the locking tab facing down as shown in the following diagram:

| o | o | o | o | o | o | o | o |
| 1 | 2 | 3 | 4 | 5 | 6 | 7 | 8 |

___

Notes:

1. Voltage source requirements are to supply 4.75 V to 10.0 V nominal DC with IMAX (current) to sink (master) at 85mA.
2. This voltage source pin may also be used as an RS-232 DTR output signal to tell the Master or network adapter that the Slave unit is powered on and operational.
3. This connector configuration differs slightly from the original CSAFE specification to allow backward compatibility with some existing RJ-11 based products.
4. Any connection between Signal Ground and Shield is manufacturer-specific and should not be assumed.

== Communications protocol ==
The communications protocol works in two modes: standard and extended. The primary difference between the two modes is that the extended mode adds source and destination address fields to the frame. The standard frame mode would normally be used in the case where there is only one piece of exercise equipment attached to one computer. This mode is primarily useful in a home setting where there is only one piece of exercise equipment and one controlling computer.

The extended mode is intended for use where multiple pieces of exercise equipment are attached to one or more computers via a shared link. This mode is useful in a gym setting with multiple pieces of exercise equipment located far away from the controlling computer. All of the equipment could be connected to a single multiplexing box which in turn connects to the controlling computer over a long cable .
