= Optoma =

Taiwanese electronics brand

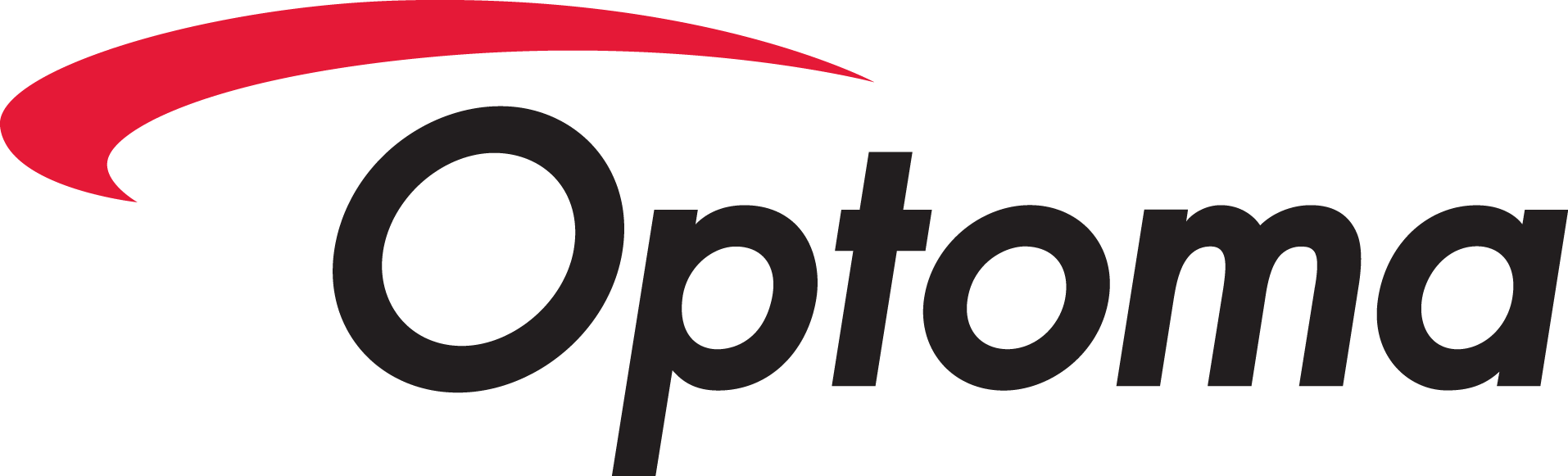
- Industry: Electronics
- Founded: 2002
- Headquarters: Hemel Hempstead, UK
- Area served: Worldwide
- Key people: SY Chen, CEO
- Number of employees: 500+ (2021)
- Parent: Coretronic Corporation

Optoma (traditional Chinese: 奧圖碼; simplified Chinese: 奥图码) is a Taiwanese projector brand. Its primary products are projectors and digital image processing equipment. Founded in 2002, it is a subsidiary of the Taiwanese electronics and manufacturing company Coretronic. It was listed on the Taiwan Stock Exchange in 2007. With 8% of the projector global market share in 2011, the Optoma brand was the second largest projector brand, behind Epson. By 2011, it had sold the most Digital Light Processing (DLP) projectors internationally for four years.

== History ==
Zhihong Technology (Chinese: 志紅科技) was created in 2002 as a subsidiary of the Taiwanese electronics and manufacturing company Coretronic. Telly Kuo later became the company's general manager and renamed it to Optoma (Chinese: 奧圖碼). The company sold 600,000 projectors in 2006, making it rank second in projector sales within the United States market and taking the fourth position globally. It sold 720p and 1080p projectors that year. Optoma Technology had an initial public offering (IPO) on the Taiwan Stock Exchange on July 12, 2007. At the IPO, it had a paid-in capital of NT$609 million (US$20,000,000), and Coretronic owned 52.74% of its shares.

With 8% of global market share, the Optoma brand in 2011 was the second largest projector brand, behind the Japanese company Epson. There are two specifications of projectors: a liquid-crystal display (LCD) projector that Epson makes and a Digital Light Processing (DLP) projector using chipsets Texas Instruments that Optoma makes. The company secured 20% of Taiwan's DLP projector share by 2007 and began selling DLP projectors directed to small and medium-sized enterprises at the end of that year. Optoma had sold the most DLP projectors internationally for four years in 2011.

== Products ==
Optoma's primary products are projectors and digital image processing equipment. For a 2002 SIGUCCS conference, the scholar Mike Honeycutt wrote, "Optoma is not generally considered a first-tier vendor of data projectors but the features of their data projectors are comparable to better-known brands at a cheaper price."

Nick Pino of TechRader penned a mostly negative review in 2014 of the home projector Optoma GT1080, criticising the sound quality and the lack of adaptability in which a 100-inch image was created when moving the projector a distance of five feet. He concluded, "Unless you’re in desperate need of a short-throw projector for that pitch-black gaming den, then you’re best served spending your money elsewhere." Wired reviewer Brendan Nystedt reviewed the home projector Optoma UHD60 in 2018. He criticised the image quality issues caused by the rainbow effect and the keystone effect as well as the large size of the projector that made it cumbersome. He praised it for being inexpensive and having a mostly noiseless fan.

In a mixed review of the home theater projector Optoma HD39HDR in 2021, IGN's Nick Woodard wrote, "If you’re purely a gamer that won’t use a projector for anything else, it might make sense to save a few more bucks and wait to invest in a product like the BenQ X1300i or the Optoma UHD38. But if you stream as much as you game, the HD39HDR is a no-brainer at this price. The sheer brightness, ease of setup and use, and exceptional picture quality of the HD39HDR easily outweigh issues like sound quality and unimpressive connections." In a 2024 PC Mag review, M. David Stone gave the home entertainment projector Optoma UHZ35ST 3.5 stars. He said it was "pricey for what it delivers", noting that two products from competitor BenQ provided better audio and 4K resolution. He praised it for having minimal input lag and a short throw distance.
