= Ally Love (fitness instructor) =

Host of Brooklyn Nets and Peloton fitness instructor

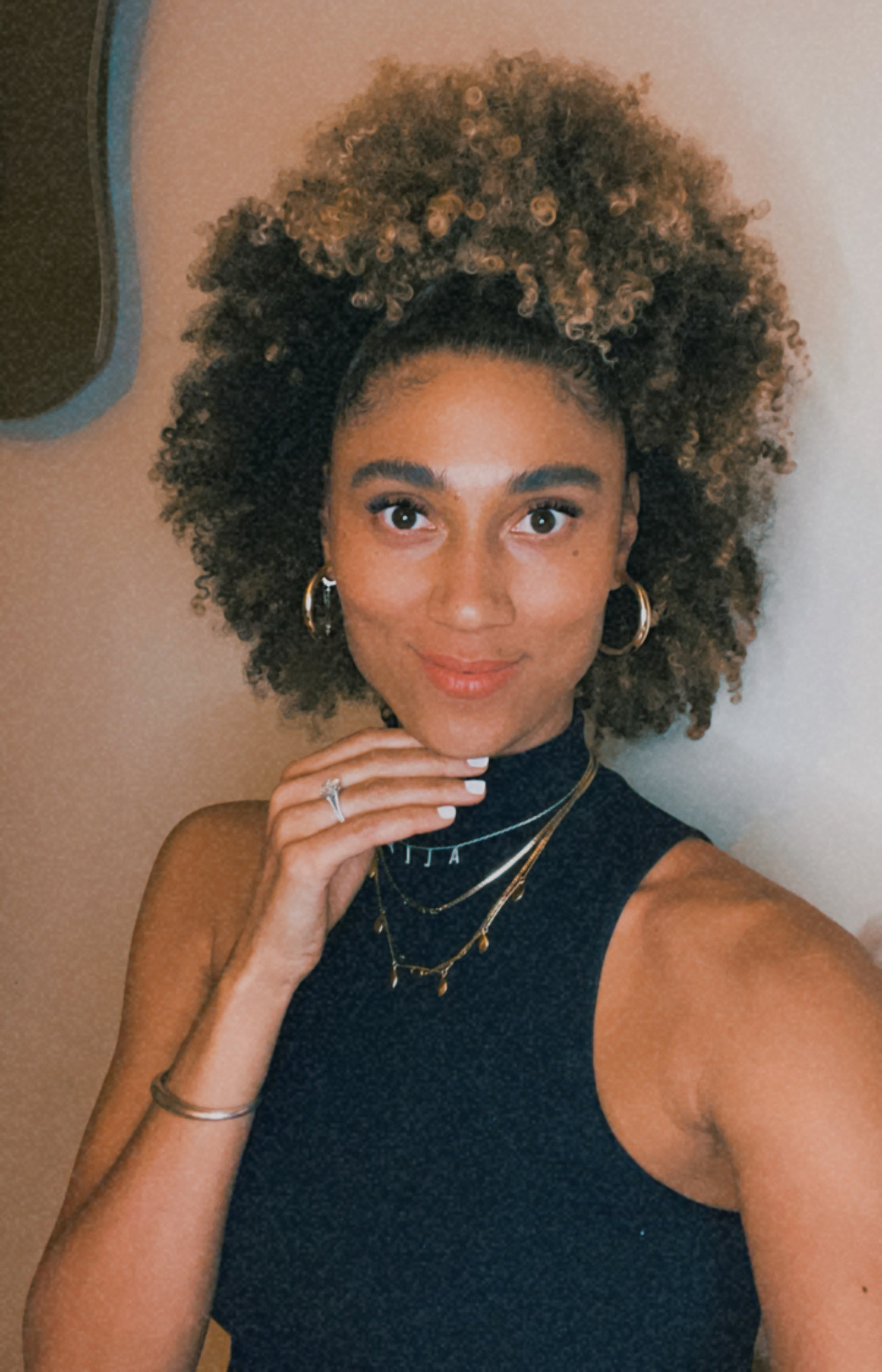
- Education: Fordham University
- Occupations: Peloton instructor, host for the Brooklyn Nets, founder & CEO of Love Squad
- Spouse: Andrew Haynes (m. 2021)

Ally Love is an American fitness instructor for Peloton and the in-arena host of the Brooklyn Nets. She began her career as a dancer for the New York Knicks and a model for brands like Adidas. She began working for the Nets as a host in 2012, which led to her hiring by Peloton in 2017. She has since founded the fitness website Love Squad and hosted the Netflix competition reality show Dance 100.

== Early life and career ==
Love was raised in Miami, Florida. When she was young, she was hit by a car and told she would likely never walk normally again, but she ultimately made a full recovery.

Love graduated from New World School of the Arts high school in Miami, where she specialized in dance. She went on to attend Fordham University's partner program with the Alvin Ailey School for dance. She earned a Bachelor of Fine Arts from Fordham, where she majored in dance and minored in theology.

== Career ==
Love has performed as a dancer for the New York Knicks and toured with contemporary ballet companies in North America, and is signed with the modeling agency Women360 management / Supreme. She has modeled in ads for Victoria's Secret, Reebok, Self Magazine, Women's Health magazine, Macy's, Kohl's, Fitness magazine, Health magazine, Doritos, and Under Armour.

Love became the in-arena host of the Brooklyn Nets at Barclays Center in 2012. In this role, she interviews players, fans, and coaches throughout the game and is featured on the stadium jumbotron.

Love has been a Peloton instructor since early 2017. Peloton scouts were interested in Love after seeing her work for the Nets and Adidas. Her Peloton instructor audition lasted only 15 minutes before she was hired for the role.

Love is the founder and CEO of Love Squad, a fitness and lifestyle website meant to empower women in business, fitness, and life. The site focuses on sports, entertainment, beauty, and fitness and has also expanded into live events in New York City, including panel events and group workouts.

Love is a global ambassador for Adidas.

Love is also a Certified Health Coach from the Institute of Integrative Nutrition and NASM certified trainer.

In 2023, Love hosted the Netflix competition reality show Dance 100.

== Personal life ==
Love resides in Manhattan, where she is a big fan of standup comedy. She married Andrew Haynes in August 2021. Haynes proposed to Ally Love on Christmas Eve on a tropical vacation to Mexico's Riviera Maya.

On August 20, 2025, Love gave birth to her first child, a son. She had never publicly announced her pregnancy, and after the child's birth stated "I needed to focus on simply making it through without the added pressure [...] Sometimes, the visible changes of pregnancy speak volumes, and that was enough transparency for me during that time."
