= Robin Arzon =

American exercise instructor and author (born 1981)

Robin Arzón
- Born: Robin Amelia Arzón; September 20, 1981 (age 45); Philadelphia, Pennsylvania, U.S.
- Occupations: VP of Fitness Programming at Peloton; Runner; Author; Fitness instructor
- Years active: 2012-present
- Notable work: Shut Up and Run (2015)
- Spouse: Drew Butler
- Children: 2

Robin Amelia Arzón (born September 20, 1981) is an American exercise instructor and author, best known as an instructor at Peloton, for which she is also the Vice President of Fitness Programming.

== Early life and education ==
Arzón was born in Philadelphia to a Cuban refugee mother and a Puerto Rican father. Her mother is a doctor who taught herself English by watching PBS. Her father is an attorney and former law professor. As a child, she was encouraged to focus on education and family. Athletics were never part of her life growing up.

Arzón attended New York University, where she graduated magna cum laude. Afterwards, she went on to attend Villanova University School of Law.

== Career ==
=== Law career ===
Arzón graduated from Villanova University School of Law in 2007 and spent seven years as a corporate litigator at Paul, Hastings, Janofsky & Walker, LLP. She was inspired and encouraged by her father, also an attorney, to pursue a career in law.

=== Beginning of fitness journey ===
In the summer of 2002, while an undergrad, Arzón was taken hostage with 40 others in a wine bar in Manhattan's East Village. "A man, armed with three pistols and a samurai sword, shot three people, doused the group with kerosene and threatened them with a barbecue lighter. He grabbed Arzón by the hair and held the gun and lighter to her head while using her as a human shield to communicate with police. Two patrons eventually tackled the man, giving police the opportunity to enter the bar and subdue him."

This trauma inspired Arzón to begin running for the first time in her life. A year later, in 2003, she saw a flyer for a 10K race at a bank on a Friday afternoon and spontaneously decided to join the run the following morning. This 10K would be Arzón's very first race and first athletic endeavor of her life. She said of the whim, "I had no idea how far the 10km distance was in miles." After the race, she began running 2–3 miles at a time in between her law school classes.

She has since run over 50 races, including 25 marathons, three 50-mile ultramarathons, and one 100-mile race. She ran her first marathon, the New York City Marathon, in 2010. She once ran five marathons in five days for MS Run the US in honor of her mother, documented in the documentary Run It Out. She completed her first 100-mile race at the Keys100 - a race that begins in Key Largo and ends in Key West, Florida - in less than 30 hours in 2016.

=== Transition to health and fitness career ===
In 2012, Arzón began a career in health and fitness after leaving her job at the law firm. She began this time as a freelance sports reporter, writing for publications like Newsweek and New York Magazine. She did sports reporting from the London Olympics in 2012.

Arzón wanted to be closer to the athletics and wanted to show others that there is an alternative way to be an athlete. She reached out to John Foley, CEO of Peloton, and in 2014 she joined Peloton in New York City as an instructor.

In 2013, Arzón co-founded the fitness movement Undo Ordinary and Undo magazine in 2013.

In 2016, she was promoted to Vice President of Fitness and Programming of Peloton.

She was one of 20 elite Americans to trek the Serengeti in National Geographic Channel's "MYGRATIONS" in 2015. The series, which aired in 2016, showed 20 people trekking the journey of the annual wildebeest migration that happens every spring from the Serengeti Plains to Maasai Mara in Kenya. The cast members, who were formed of survivalists and athletes, were given no maps or weapons and carried only food and water.

Arzón is a global Adidas ambassador. She starred in their Here to Create campaign commercial in 2016. She is also a Road Runners Club of America-certified running coach.

== Personal life ==
Arzón was diagnosed with Type 1 Diabetes in 2014 and is currently on the Leadership Council of Beyond Type One, a nonprofit organization focused on raising awareness about Type 1 Diabetes founded by Nick Jonas.

In 2019, Arzón married investment manager Drew Butler in Tulum, Mexico. She and Butler met at a speakeasy bar in Manhattan's East Village in 2016. Their four-day, immersive wedding experience was inspired by their mutual love of Burning Man.

Arzón and Butler announced the birth of their first child, a daughter named Athena Amelia Arzón-Butler, on March 2, 2021, and their son Atlas was born on July 16, 2023.

Arzón is a vegan.

== Bibliography ==
- Shut Up and Run: How to Get Up, Lace Up, and Sweat with Swagger (June 2016); ISBN 9780062445681
- Strong Mama (January 2022);ISBN 0316299944
