= NordicTrack =

American exercise equipment company

- Type: Private
- Industry: Exercise equipment
- Founded: 1975; 51 years ago Chaska, Minnesota, U.S.
- Founders: Edward Pauls; Florence Pauls
- Headquarters: Logan, Utah, U.S.
- Area served: Worldwide
- Products: Treadmills, ellipticals, exercise bikes, rowers, strength training equipment, and accessories
- Owner: iFIT Inc.
- Website: nordictrack.com

NordicTrack is an American company that manufactures treadmills, ellipticals, exercise bikes, rowers, strength training equipment, and accessories. It is best known for its incline trainer treadmills. The brand started with Nordic ski machines. NordicTrack is owned by iFIT Inc., which was known as ICON Health & Fitness until it rebranded in 2021 to reflect its focus on interactive training technology. It is headquartered in Logan, Utah. The company has been manufacturing exercise equipment since 1975.

== History ==
=== Founding: 1970s ===
NordicTrack was founded by Edward and Florence Pauls in 1975, when Ed Pauls invented the original NordicTrack ski machine in his garage in Chaska, Minnesota, to train for the local VJC cross-country ski race. Ed Pauls was an engineer who usually got home after dark and was motivated to beat a Swedish friend in the race. At the time, the Pauls were making the Flip Ski (a crutch ski used by leg-handicapped downhill skiers) as a part-time mail-order business in their basement. Several of their first machines were branded "Nordic Jock", as their original market was anticipated to be college ski racers. The product was later renamed NordicTrack. In 1976, the NordicTrack was patented.

The company moved to the Jonathan industrial park in Chaska, where it first rented and later constructed buildings for manufacturing, mail- and phone-order sales, and warehousing. The sales concept was mail-order.

Advertisements were placed in magazines, including Smithsonian, National Geographic, The New Yorker, and The Wall Street Journal. The advertisements were distinct in that they consisted primarily of text explaining the benefits of cardiovascular exercise, typically accompanied by a small picture of the machine in use.

The company was built and operated on the cash-and-carry basis, and no money was ever borrowed during the Pauls' ownership from 1975 to 1986.

=== 1980s ===
During the outsourcing manufacturing era of the 1980s, the Pauls family, having a mechanical background, chose to manufacture the machines in-house. Initially, machines were built one at a time on special benches. The company later moved to an assembly line that could manufacture several thousand units a day. From the start, the woodworking, varnishing, welding, machining, sewing, assembly, packaging, advertising, mailing and sales were all done in-house, primarily by Chaska residents who were trained by NordicTrack for their specific jobs. As sales grew, more specialized automated procedures were developed. A UV-varnish conveyor line, full powder coat paint line, robotic welders, two level assembly lines, and a full printing operation and bulk mailing facility were added.

The use of the new VHS video technology was pioneered to show the buyer how to use this new unboxed machine at home during the 30-day trial period. A NordicTrack ski machine takes the average person some time to learn; like a bicycle, it takes balance and coordination to operate. The advent of disposable VHS tapes helped demonstrate the machine's effectiveness to the owners. This is cited as to why the ski machine never sold well in stores; people were embarrassed to fumble in public, whereas at home with the video, they could learn it comfortably. The 30-day returns dropped drastically after the video addition.

The NordicTrack was shipped in two boxes and was designed to just squeak under the 40 pounds (18 kg) UPS weight limit. In 1975 United Parcel Service changed from a limited-destination to a full national and international shipping company. Both companies grew and benefited from the daily truckloads of exercisers rolling out.

Around 1984, Edward and Florence decided that it was time to move on, as they were getting older and managing a new startup took a whole different personality than managing a name-brand, multi-national corporation.

In 1986 NordicTrack was sold to CML Corporation (CMLK), which moved operations out of Chaska. CML opened retail stores nationally, focused marketing on infomercials, and even began manufacturing other exercise products that were in direct competition of the original NordicTrack. Additionally, CML bought up a number of mom and pop startup companies during the 80s. When competitors emerged and the market became over-saturated, CML (NordicTrack and its subsidiaries) could not sustain the debt incurred from expanding its retail division and marketing operations. Now a bloated multi-national, CML could not stay ahead of its spending. It closed its 300+ retail stores, and filed bankruptcy in 1998.

=== Acquisition ===
In 1998, Icon Health & Fitness acquired NordicTrack's key patents, trademarks, and intellectual property for $9.5 million. Since then, NordicTrack continued to manufacture their classic skier. They also manufacture elliptical trainers and exercise bikes. During the late 1990s and early 2000s, the company made their first and only foray in the commercial gym equipment market with their 9600 series. This range included a treadmill, an incline trainer, an elliptical, and recumbent and upright bikes. After the 9600 series was discontinued, NordicTrack has not made any more commercial gym equipment ever since. In 2009, NordicTrack pioneered the incline trainer, a specialty treadmill that can reach an incline of up to 40%.

== Recent Developments ==
In January 2019 at the Consumer Electronics Show in Las Vegas, NordicTrack released a hybrid of a virtual reality gaming product with a stationary bicycle. This system allowed integrated a virtual reality headset with "gaming 8-axis yoke" handlebars to gamify the workout. The propulsion in the game comes from pedaling the bike through various landscapes and sync with gameplay. The NordicTrack VR bike also comes with an iFit connection that automatically adjusts resistance, incline, and decline based upon commands from an online personal trainer.

In late March 2020, the Wall Street Journal reported that NordicTrack saw a dramatic sales spike in NordicTrack fitness equipment due to the coronavirus pandemic stay-at-home policies issued around the world to deal with the crisis.

== Awards ==
In August 2019, the Boy Genius Report picked the NordicTrack T Series treadmill as their "Best Overall" at-home treadmill.

=== Consumer reports ===
In 2017, Consumer Reports gave NordicTrack one of their models a Best Buy and three models received a Recommended rating.

Two NordicTrack products received the Consumer Reports Recommended Buy awards, and two NordicTrack treadmills received Best Buy awards in 2016.

=== Best buy ===
- NordicTrack C1650 (2017)
- NordicTrack Elite9700 Pro (2016)
- NordicTrack 790 Pro (2016)

=== Recommended buy ===
- NordicTrack C970 (2017)
- NordicTrack C990 (2017)
- NordicTrack Sport 7.5 (2017)
- NordicTrack Commercial 1750 (2016)
- NordicTrack C1650 (2016)
