= Exercise equipment =

Device used for physical activity

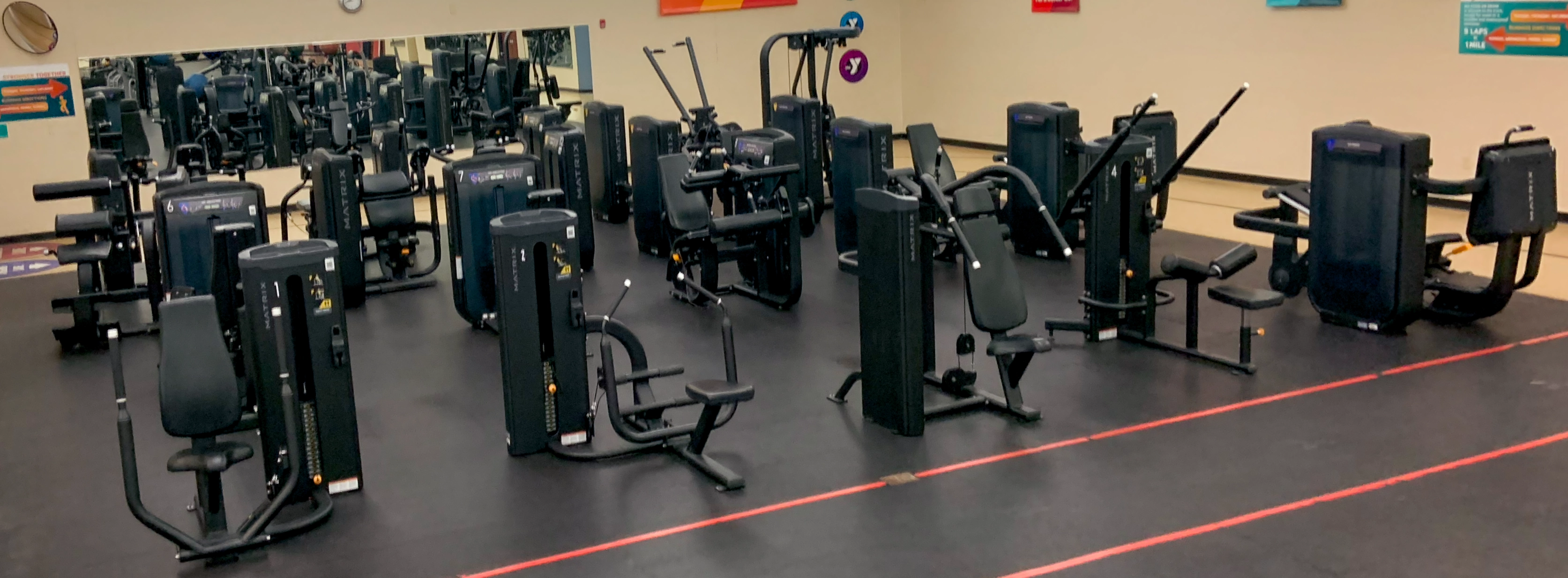
Exercise equipment at a YMCA

A selection of home exercise equipment: yoga blocks, yoga mat, dumbbells, pull-up/chin-up bar, push-up handles and gloves.

Exercise equipment is any apparatus or device used during physical activity to enhance the strength or conditioning effects of that exercise by providing either fixed or adjustable amounts of resistance, or to otherwise enhance the experience or outcome of an exercise routine.

Exercise equipment may also include such wearable items as proper footgear, gloves, and hydration packs.

== List of exercise equipment ==
See List of exercise equipment

== See also ==
- Communications Specification for Fitness Equipment, a fitness industry-wide communications specification
- Exercise machine
- Fitness (biology)
- Fitness trail, a path with exercise equipment along its length
- High-intensity interval training
- Hojo undō, conditioning exercises used in martial arts
- Indoor rower
- Outdoor gym
- Physical exercise
- Weight training
