= 2002 Ms. Olympia =

Women's professional bodybuilding competition

- Promotion: IFBB
- Date: October 18, 2002
- Venue: Mandalay Bay Arena
- City: Paradise, Nevada, United States

Event chronology
2001 Ms. Olympia	2002 Ms. Olympia	2003 Ms. Olympia

The 2002 Ms. Olympia contest is an IFBB professional bodybuilding competition and part of Joe Weider's Olympia Fitness & Performance Weekend 2002 was held on October 18, 2002, at the Mandalay Bay Arena in Paradise, Nevada. It was the 23rd Ms. Olympia competition held. Other events at the exhibition include the Mr. Olympia and Fitness Olympia contests.

== Prize money ==
- Overall - $20,000
- 1st (Lightweight (LW)) - $10,000
- 1st (Heavyweight (HW)) - $10,000
- 2nd (LW) - $6,000
- 2nd (HW) - $6,000
- 3rd (LW) - $4,000
- 3rd (HW) - $4,000
- 4th (LW) - $3,000
- 4th (HW) - $3,000
- 5th (LW) - $2,000
- 5th (HW) - $2,000

Total: $70,000

== Rounds ==
- Round 1 (Symmetry Round): Judging the overall balance and proportion of contestants' physiques.
- Round 2 (Muscularity/Conditioning Round): Focused on muscle size, definition, and conditioning, emphasizing leanness and muscle separation.
- Round 3 (Compulsory Poses Round): Contestants performed mandatory poses to showcase specific muscle groups.
- Round 4 (Posedown Round): A final posedown where the top contestants directly compared their physiques for the judges.

== Results ==
=== Scorecard ===
-- Overall --
Lenda Murray
No	Name	Country	1	2	3	4	Total	Place
-- Lightweights up to 135 lbs --
1	Susanne Niederhauser	(Austria)	33	34	35		102	7
2	Fannie Barrios	(Venezuela)	15	11	15	13	54	3
3	Angela Debatin	(Brazil)	26	25	26		77	5
4	Juliette Bergmann	(Netherlands)	5	5	5	5	20	1
5	Laura Creavalle	(United States)	30	31	27		88	6
6	Valentina Chepiga	(Ukraine)	10	14	10	12	46	2
7	Sophie Duquette	(Canada)	20	20	20		60	4
-- Heavyweights over 135 lbs --
14	Yaxeni Oriquen-Garcia	(Venezuela)	19	18	17		54	4
15	Dayana Cadeau	(Canada)	29	25	27		81	5
16	Beth Roberts	(United States)	40	39	37		116	8
17	Vickie Gates	(United States)	16	18	18	15	67	3
18	Nancy Lewis	(United States)	25	30	27		82	6
19	Iris Kyle	(United States)	10	10	10	10	40	2
20	Betty Viana-Adkins	(Venezuela)	35	36	37		108	7
21	Lenda Murray	(United States)	5	5	5	5	20	1

Comparison to previous Olympia results:

- +1 - Lenda Murray
- -1 - Iris Kyle
- -1 - Vickie Gates
- -1 - Yaxeni Oriquen-Garcia
- -2 - Dayana Cadeau
- +4 - Nancy Lewis
- +2 - Valentina Chepiga
- +5 - Fannie Barrios
- +4 - Angela Debatin
- -3 - Laura Creavalle

== Attended ==
- 13th Ms. Olympia attended - Laura Creavalle
- 9th Ms. Olympia attended - Lenda Murray
- 7th Ms. Olympia attended - Vickie Gates
- 6th Ms. Olympia attended - Juliette Bergmann
- 5th Ms. Olympia attended - Valentina Chepiga, Nancy Lewis, and Yaxeni Oriquen-Garcia
- 4th Ms. Olympia attended - Iris Kyle
- 3rd Ms. Olympia attended - Dayana Cadeau
- 2nd Ms. Olympia attended - Fannie Barrios and Angela DeBatin
- 1st Ms. Olympia attended - Sophie Duquette, Susanne Niederhauser, Beth Roberts, and Betty Viana
- Previous year Olympia attendees who did not attend – Renee Casella, Kim Harris, Lesa Lewis, Gayle Moher, Betty Pariso, Brenda Raganot, and Joanna Thomas

== Notable events ==
- Lenda Murray comes back after a four-year hiatus to win her 7th overall and heavyweight Ms. Olympia title, thus surpassing Cory Everson's six overall Olympia wins. Juliette Bergmann wins her 2nd lightweight Ms. Olympia title.
- This was Laura Creavalle last Olympia before her retirement.

== 2002 Ms. Olympia Qualified ==
#	Name	How Qualified
1	Lenda Murray	Ms. Olympia Winner
2	Valentina Chepiga	Ms. Olympia Winner
3	Juliette Bergmann	Ms. Olympia Winner
4	Andrulla Blanchette	Ms. Olympia Winner
5	Dayana Cadeau	2001 Ms. Olympia LW
6	Iris Kyle	2001 Ms. Olympia HW
7	Vickie Gates	2001 Ms. Olympia HW
8	Yaxeni Oriquen-Garcia	2001 Ms. Olympia HW
9	Fannie Barrios	2002 Ms. International LW 3rd
10	Betty Viana-Adkins	2002 Southwest Pro HW
11	Angela Debatin	2002 Southwest Pro MW
12	Susanne Niederhauser	2002 Southwest Pro LW
13	Nancy Lewis	2002 Jan Tana Pro MW 1st
14	Beth Roberts	2002 Jan Tana Pro HW 1st
15	Laura Creavalle	Special Invite

== See also ==
- 2002 Mr. Olympia
