= 2003 Ms. Olympia =

Women's professional bodybuilding competition

- Promotion: IFBB
- Date: October 24, 2003
- Venue: Mandalay Bay Arena
- City: Paradise, Nevada, United States

Event chronology
2002 Ms. Olympia	2003 Ms. Olympia	2004 Ms. Olympia

The 2003 Ms. Olympia contest is an IFBB professional bodybuilding competition and part of Joe Weider's Olympia Fitness & Performance Weekend 2003 was held on October 24, 2003, at the Mandalay Bay Arena in Paradise, Nevada. It was the 24th Ms. Olympia competition held. Other events at the exhibition include the Mr. Olympia, Fitness Olympia, and Figure Olympia contests.

== Prize money ==
- Overall - $10,000
- 1st (Lightweight (LW)) - $10,000
- 1st (Heavyweight (HW)) - $10,000
- 2nd (LW) - $6,000
- 2nd (HW) - $6,000
- 3rd (LW) - $4,000
- 3rd (HW) - $4,000
- 4th (LW) - $3,000
- 4th (HW) - $3,000
- 5th (LW) - $2,000
- 5th (HW) - $2,000

Total: $60,000

== Rounds ==
- Round 1 (Symmetry Round): Judging the balance and proportion of the contestants' physiques.
- Round 2 (Muscularity/Conditioning Round): Focused on muscle size, definition, and overall conditioning, including leanness and muscle separation.
- Round 3 (Compulsory Poses Round): Contestants performed specific mandatory poses to highlight key muscle groups.
- Round 4 (Posedown Round): Contestants presented a choreographed routine to music, emphasizing creativity, presentation, and overall stage presence.

== Weight-in ==
Heavyweights over 135 lb (61 kg):

- Betty Pariso - 169.5 lb (76.9 kg)
- Yaxeni Oriquen-Garcia - 161 lb (73 kg)
- Betty Viana-Adkins - 159.5 lb (72.3 kg)
- Helle Trevino - 158 lb (72 kg)
- Iris Kyle - 157.5 lb (71.4 kg)
- Vickie Gates - 154.5 lb (70.1 kg)
- Lenda Murray - 151.5 lb (68.7 kg)

Lightweights up to 135 lb (61 kg):

- Cathy LeFrançois - 134.5 lb (61.0 kg)
- Kim Harris - 134 lb (61 kg)
- Rosemary Jennings - 133.5 lb (60.6 kg)
- Juliette Bergmann - 130.5 lb (59.2 kg)
- Angela Debatin - 129 lb (59 kg)
- Dayana Cadeau - 127 lb (58 kg)
- Denise Masino - 127 lb (58 kg)
- Fannie Barrios - 122.5 lb (55.6 kg)

== Results ==
=== Scorecard ===
-- Overall --
Lenda Murray
No	Name	Country	1	2	3	4	Total	Place
-- Lightweights up to 135 lbs --
1	Cathy Priest	(Canada)	15	20	20	20	75	4
2	Fannie Barrios	(Venezuela)	30	31	32	20	113	6
3	Angela Debatin	(Brazil)	25	26	25	20	96	5
4	Dayana Cadeau	(Canada)	16	7	9	6	38	2
5	Rosemary Jennings	(United States)	40	34	38	20	132	7
6	Denise Masino	(United States)	16	12	14	14	56	3
7	Juliette Bergmann	(Netherlands)	5	13	7	9	34	1
8	Kim Harris	(United States)	35	39	36	20	130	7
-- Heavyweights over 135 lbs --
9	Helle Trevino	(United States)	30	23	24	20	97	5
10	Yaxeni Oriquen-Garcia	(Venezuela)	14	15	15	15	59	3
11	Lenda Murray	(United States)	5	5	5	5	20	1
12	Betty Viana-Adkins	(Venezuela)	20	23	27	20	90	4
13	Iris Kyle	(United States)	11	10	10	10	41	2
14	Betty Pariso	(United States)	28	30	28	20	106	6
15	Vickie Gates	(United States)	32	35	34	20	121	7

Comparison to previous Olympia results:

- Same - Lenda Murray
- Same - Iris Kyle
- +1 - Yaxeni Oriquen-Garcia
- +3 - Betty Viana-Adkins
- Same - Betty Pariso
- -4 - Vickie Gates
- Same - Juliette Bergmann
- +3 - Dayana Cadeau
- Same - Cathy LeFrançois
- Same - Angela Debatin
- -3 - Fannie Barrios
- Same - Kim Harris

== Attended ==
- 10th Ms. Olympia attended - Lenda Murray
- 8th Ms. Olympia attended - Vickie Gates
- 7th Ms. Olympia attended - Juliette Bergmann
- 6th Ms. Olympia attended - Yaxeni Oriquen-Garcia
- 5th Ms. Olympia attended - Iris Kyle
- 4th Ms. Olympia attended - Dayana Cadeau
- 3rd Ms. Olympia attended - Fannie Barrios and Angela Debatin
- 2nd Ms. Olympia attended - Kim Harris, Betty Pariso, Cathy LeFrançois, and Betty Viana-Adkins
- 1st Ms. Olympia attended - Rosemary Jennings, Denise Masino, and Helle Trevino
- Previous year Olympia attendees who did not attend – Valentina Chepiga, Laura Creavalle, Sophie Duquette, Nancy Lewis, Susanne Niederhauser, and Beth Roberts

== Notable events ==
- Lenda Murray wins her 8th overall and heavyweight Ms. Olympia title, thus having more Olympia tiles than any other female bodybuilder until 2012 when Iris Kyle tied with her overall title. Juliette Bergmann wins her 3rd lightweight Ms. Olympia title.
- At the 2003 Olympia Press Conference, Lenda was asked a question about how she felt about winning last year, although Iris may have had better body parts on an individual basis, and her response focused on the total package, which IFBB Pro Division Wayne Demillia seconded.
- During the weekend of the 2003 Ms. Olympia, Vickie Gates' announced her retirement.

== 2003 Ms. Olympia Qualified ==
#	Name	How Qualified
1	Lenda Murray	Ms. Olympia Winner
2	Valentina Chepiga	Ms. Olympia Winner
3	Juliette Bergmann	Ms. Olympia Winner
4	Andrulla Blanchette	Ms. Olympia Winner
5	Iris Kyle	2002 Ms. Olympia HW
6	Vickie Gates	2002 Ms. Olympia HW
7	Fannie Barrios	2002 Ms. Olympia LW
8	Yaxeni Oriquen-Garcia	2002 Show of Strength HW
9	Cathy LeFrancois	2002 Show Of Strength LW
10	Betty Pariso	2003 Ms. International HW
11	Denise Masino	2003 Ms. International LW
12	Kim Harris	2003 Night of Champions MW
13	Betty Viana-Adkins	2003 Night of Champions HW
14	Angela Debatin	2003 Jan Tana Pro LW
15	Dayana Cadeau	2003 Jan Tana Pro MW
16	Helle Trevino	2003 Jan Tana Pro HW

== See also ==
- 2003 Mr. Olympia
