= 2001 Ms. Olympia =

Bodybuilding competition

- Promotion: IFBB
- Date: October 26, 2001
- Venue: Mandalay Bay Arena
- City: Paradise, Nevada, United States

Event chronology
2000 Ms. Olympia	2001 Ms. Olympia	2002 Ms. Olympia

The 2001 Ms. Olympia contest is an IFBB professional bodybuilding competition and part of Joe Weider's Olympia Fitness & Performance Weekend 2001 was held on October 26, 2001, at the Mandalay Bay Arena in Paradise, Nevada. It was the 22nd Ms. Olympia competition held. Other events at the exhibition include the Mr. Olympia and Fitness Olympia contests.

== Prize money ==
- Overall - $10,000
- 1st (Lightweight (LW)) - $10,000
- 1st (Heavyweight (HW)) - $10,000
- 2nd (LW) - $6,000
- 2nd (HW) - $6,000
- 3rd (LW) - $4,000
- 3rd (HW) - $4,000

Total: $50,000

== Rounds ==
- Round 1 (Symmetry Round): Judging contestants' balance and proportion.
- Round 2 (Muscularity/Conditioning Round): Focused on muscle size, definition, and conditioning, emphasizing leanness and separation.
- Round 3 (Compulsory Poses Round): Contestants performed mandatory poses to highlight key muscle groups.
- Round 4 (Posedown Round): Contestants engaged in a final posedown to compare their physiques directly.

== Call outs ==
=== Individual posing ===
1. Dayana Cadeau: Posing songs - Differences / Family Affair
2. Renee Casella: Posing song - We Are
3. Juliette Bergmann: Posing song - I've Never Been to Me
4. Joanna Thomas: Posing song - I Ask of You
5. Kim Harris: Posing song - Dance with Me
6. Brenda Raganot: Posing song - Bootylicious
7. Gayle Moher: Posing song - Desert Rose
8. Angela Debatin: Posing song - Genie in a Bottle
9. Fannie Barrios: Posing songs - You Can Leave Your Hat On / 20th Century Fox Fanfare / Soul Bossa Nova / Bootylicious / Lady Marmalade
10. Andrulla Blanchette: Posing songs - War / The Greatest Love of All
11. Vickie Gates: Posing songs - Slowly / One Minute Man / Lady Marmalade
12. Lesa Lewis: Posing songs - Bad Boy for Life
13. Betty Pariso: Posing song - To Love You More
14. Valentina Chepiga: Posing song -
15. Yaxeni Oriquen: Posing song - Fallin'
16. Iris Kyle: Next Generation

=== Prejudging posing ===
Call Outs from Round One: Lightweights

- Cadeau - Blachette - Bergman
- Raganot - Blachette - Moher
- Casella - Raganot - Harris
- Debatin - Barios - Thomas
- Bergman - Harris - Blanchette
- Casella - Debatin - Thomas
- Raganot - Moher - Harris
- Barrios - Moher - Cadeau
- Harris - Moher - Casella
- Bergman - Blachette
- Cadaeu - Bergman - Blanchette

Call Outs from Round Two: Lightweights

- Cadeau - Blachette - Bergman
- Casella - Cadeau - Raganot
- Casella - Moher - Barrios
- Thomas - Harris - Debatin
- Debatin - Raganot - Moher

Call Outs from Round One: Heavyweights

- Chepiga - Gates - Lewis
- Kyle - Oriquen - Lewis
- Foster - Pariso - Lewis
- Gates - Oriquen - Kyle

Call Outs from Round Two: Heavyweights

- Oriquen - Gates - Kyle
- Lewis - Chepiga - Pariso
- Gates - Kyle - Oriquen
- Chepiga - Kyle - Oriquen

== Results ==
=== Scorecard ===
ATHLETES	FIRST ROUND										SUBTOT1	SECOND ROUND										SUBTOT2	Tot1-2	THIRD ROUND										SUBTOT3	Tot1-2-3	FOURTH ROUND										SUBTOT4	TOTAL	RANK
										X									X													X													X			
NAMES	1	2	3	4	5	6	7	8	9	10		1	2	3	4	5	6	7	8	9	10			1	2	3	4	5	6	7	8	9	10			1	2	3	4	5	6	7	8	9	10			
1) Dayana CADEAU (Canada)	3	3	3	3	3	3	3	3	3	3	15	3	3	3	3	2	4	3	2	2	3	15	30	4	4	4	4	2	4	3	3	3	3	18	48	3	3	3	3	3	3	3	3	3	3	15	63	3
2) Renee CASELLA (United States)	5	7	5	5	10	7	8	8	7	9	34	6	8	6	6	6	6	9	7	8	10	34	68	6	5	6	6	5	6	10	8	6	10	32	100												100	6
3) Juliette BERGMANN (Netherlands)	1	1	1	1	1	2	2	1	1	2	5	1	1	1	1	1	1	1	2	3	3	5	10	1	1	1	1	1	1	1	1	1	1	5	15	1	1	1	1	1	1	1	1	1	1	5	20	1
4) Joanna THOMAS (United Kingdom)	8	10	10	10	9	8	9	9	9	7	46	10	10	10	10	10	10	10	7	10	10	7	50	96	10	10	10	10	10	10	7	9	7	9	49	145											145	10
5) Kim HARRIS (United States)	7	6	7	7	4	6	4	6	6	6	31	9	7	8	8	9	8	8	8	7	8	40	71	8	7	8	8	6	7	6	6	8	7	35	106												106	7
6) Brenda RAGANOT (United States)	4	4	4	4	7	4	5	4	4	5	20	4	4	4	4	7	3	4	4	4	4	20	40	3	3	3	3	8	3	4	4	4	4	17	57												57	4
7) Gayle MOHER (United Kingdom)	6	5	6	6	5	5	6	5	5	4	27	7	6	7	7	4	5	5	5	5	5	28	55	5	6	7	7	4	5	5	5	5	5	26	81												81	5
8) Angela DEBATIN (Brazil)	10	8	9	9	6	10	10	10	10	8	48	8	9	9	9	5	9	10	9	9	6	44	92	9	8	9	9	7	9	8	10	9	6	43	135												135	9
9) Fannie BARRIOS (Venezuela)	9	9	8	8	9	9	7	7	8	10	42	5	5	5	5	8	7	6	6	6	9	29	71	7	9	5	5	9	8	8	7	10	8	38	109												109	8
10) Andrulla BLANCHETTE (United Kingdom)	2	2	2	2	2	1	1	2	2	1	10	2	2	2	2	3	2	1	1	1	2	10	20	2	2	2	2	3	2	2	2	2	2	10	30	2	2	2	2	2	2	2	2	2	2	10	40	2
Heavy weight																																																
11) Vickie GATES (United States)	1	1	1	1	1	1	2	1	1	3	5	3	2	3	3	1	3	3	3	2	4	14	19	2	2	2	2	2	4	4	3	2	4	13	32	2	2	2	3	1	3	2	3	2	3	11	43	2
12) Lesa LEWIS (United States)	5	4	5	5	2	5	5	5	5	5	25	4	4	4	4	4	5	5	5	5	6	22	47	5	5	5	5	4	5	5	5	4	5	25	72												72	5
13) Betty PARISO (United States)	6	6	6	6	6	6	6	6	6	6	30	5	6	5	5	6	6	6	6	6	5	28	58	6	6	6	6	6	6	6	6	6	6	30	88												88	6
14) Heather FOSTER (United States)	7	7	7	7	7	7	7	7	7	7	35	7	7	7	7	7	7	7	7	7	7	35	70	7	7	7	7	7	7	7	7	7	7	35	105												105	7
15) Valentina CHEPIGA (Ukraine)	2	2	2	2	5	2	4	4	2	1	12	6	5	6	6	5	4	4	4	4	2	24	36	1	1	1	1	5	3	1	1	3	3	7	43												43	4
16) Yaxeni ORIQUEN (Venezuela)	3	5	3	3	3	3	1	2	4	4	15	2	3	2	2	2	2	2	2	3	3	11	26	3	4	4	4	1	2	3	2	5	2	14	40	3	3	3	2	3	1	3	1	3	2	14	54	3
17) Iris KYLE (United States)	4	3	4	4	4	4	3	3	3	2	18	1	1	1	1	3	1	1	1	1	1	5	23	4	3	3	3	3	1	2	4	1	1	14	37	1	1	1	1	2	2	1	2	1	1	6	43	1

Judges:
1-Rockell
2-C.Sanchez
3-Weinberger
4-Frig
5-Beckles
6-Calascione
7-Baldantoni
8-Kemper
9-Ourama
10-Feinstein

Comparison to previous Olympia results:

- +12 - Juliette Bergmann
- +4 - Iris Kyle
- Same - Vickie Gates
- +1 - Yaxeni Oriquen-Garcia
- -3 - Valentina Chepiga
- Same - Lesa Lewis
- -1 - Andrulla Blanchette
- +11 - Dayana Cadeau
- -2 - Brenda Reganot
- -6 - Gayle Moher
- -3 - Renee Casella

== Attended ==
- 6th Ms. Olympia attended - Vickie Gates
- 5th Ms. Olympia attended - Juliette Bergmann, Andrulla Blanchette, and Lesa Lewis
- 4th Ms. Olympia attended - Valentina Chepiga and Yaxeni Oriquen-Garcia
- 3rd Ms. Olympia attended - Renee Casella, Iris Kyle, and Brenda Raganot
- 2nd Ms. Olympia attended - Dayana Cadeau and Gayle Moher
- 1st Ms. Olympia attended - Fannie Barrios, Angela Debatin, Kim Harris, Betty Pariso, and Joanna Thomas
- Previous year Olympia attendees who did not attend - Th-resa Bostick, Denise Hoshor, Cathy LeFrançois, and Jennifer McVicar

== Notable events ==
- Juliette Bergmann won her 1st lightweight and overall Ms. Olympia title. She had not competed since the 1989 World Pro Championships and was considered a dark horse competitor.
  - There was controversy over the 2001 Ms. Olympia overall title being awarded to Juliette, with some claiming the move was political. For the past 10 years, she has been a still active International Federation of BodyBuilding and Fitness (IFBB) international judge, working alongside the same judges who decided the outcome of 2001 Ms. Olympia.
  - There was no scoresheet for the overall. Jim Manion counted the votes and verbally communicated who the winner was, but nothing was written down. According to Jim, the 8 judges voted for Juliette Bergmann, while 2 judges voted for Iris Kyle.
  - This was the only Ms. Olympia where the lightweight Ms. Olympia title winner beat the heavyweight Ms. Olympia title winner to win the overall Ms. Olympia title.
- Iris Kyle won her 1st heavyweight Ms. Olympia title. At the end of the fourth round, both Iris Kyle and Vickie Gates were tied in the scorecard at 43 points. Iris won due to the IFBB tie breaking rule that the discarded highs and lows from all three previous rounds will be used to break the tie, with her getting 12 first place votes, while Vickie got 9 first place votes.
  - This was the slimmest margin of victory for a Ms. Olympia heavyweight title.
  - This was the only Ms. Olympia where the heavyweight Ms. Olympia title was won through a IFBB tie breaking rule.
- The two emcee of the 2001 Ms. Olympia was Tim Wilkins and Monica Brant.
- The overall posedown song was It's My Life by Bon Jovi.
- The top three heavyweight and top three lightweight posedown song was Tom Sawyer by Rush.

== 2001 Ms. Olympia Qualified ==
#	Name	How Qualified
1	Valentina Chepiga	Ms. Olympia Winner
2	Andrulla Blanchette	Ms. Olympia Winner
3	Vickie Gates	2000 Ms. Olympia HW 2nd
4	Lesa Lewis	2000 Ms. Olympia HW 3rd
5	Brenda Raganot	2000 Ms. Olympia LW 2nd
6	Renee Casella	2000 Ms. Olympia LW 3rd
7	Iris Kyle	2001 Ms. International HW 2nd
8	Dayana Cadeau	2001 Ms. International LW 1st
9	Angela Debatin	2001 Ms. International LW 3rd
10	Betty Pariso	2001 Jan Tana Pro Classic HW 1st
11	Fannie Barrios	2001 Jan Tana Pro Classic MW 1st
12	Joanna Thomas	2001 Jan Tana Pro Classic LW 1st
13	Heather Foster	2001 Women's Pro Extravaganza HW 1st
14	Kim Harris	2001 Women's Pro Extravaganza MW 1st
15	Gayle Moher	2001 Women's Pro Extravaganza LW 1st
16	Juliette Bergmann	Special Invite
17	Yaxeni Oriquen-Garcia	Special Invite

== See also ==
- 2001 Mr. Olympia
