= Cathey Palyo =

American bodybuilder

- Professional bodybuilder

Personal info
- Born: Catt Tripoli; 1957 or 1958 (age 67–68); California, United States

Best statistics

Professional (Pro) career
- Pro-debut: IFBB Ms. Olympia; 1997
- Best win: IFBB Ms. International champion; 1988
- Predecessor: Erika Geisen
- Successor: Jackie Paisley
- Active: Retired 1988

Cathey Palyo (born 1957 or 1958) is a professional female bodybuilder from the United States.

== Bodybuilding career ==
Palyo rose through the amateur ranks and won the overall title at the National Physique Committee Nationals in 1986, and in 1988, became the first American women to win the Ms. International contest.

=== Contest history ===
- 1985 AAU Ms. America - 1st (medium)
- 1985 NPC Nationals - 4th (HW)
- 1985 NPC Tournament of Champions - 1st (HW & overall)
- 1986 NPC California Championship - 1st overall
- 1986 NPC USA Championship - 1st (HW)
- 1986 IFBB World Amateur Championship - 1st (HW)
- 1986 NPC Nationals - 1st (HW & overall)
- 1986 IFBB World Mixed Pairs with J.J.Marsh - 2nd
- 1987 IFBB Ms. Olympia - 14th
- 1988 Ms. International - 1st
- 1988 Pro World Championship - 4th
- 1988 IFBB Ms. Olympia - 16th

== Later career ==
Going back to her maiden name of Catt Tripoli in 2000, she wrote and published her book - Conscious Fitness, which won the Nautilus Book Award Silver in the Body, Mind, Spirit Practices category in 2016. In 2009 she became a Certified Clinical Hypnotherapist and opened her practice in Santa Rosa California. She was the owner and developer of four gyms in Santa Rosa. 5th St Fitness, Body Central, Fusion Fitness and Powerhouse Gym. She was an annual speaker at the Omni Athlete Festival since its inception in 2016.

Ms. International
Preceded by: Erika Geisen	First (1988)	Succeeded by: Jackie Paisley
