= Posedown =

Type of bodybuilding competition posing round

In bodybuilding and physique, a posedown is a free for all posing round in a bodybuilding or physique competition where the participants strike various poses, highlighting specific muscles and their overall physique. Posedowns are usually the final part of the competition and can often decide a close competition. Some competitors like to keep pre-set routine for the posedown in order to keep the flow going and show off their muscles. There are strategies competitors adopt during posedowns to best dominate or intimidate opponents, such as the forced perspective of posing as massive as possible and covering up other opponents on stage or forcing opponents into another pose, which can throw off their pre-set posing routine. For this reason, some competitors like to go through a spontaneous routine and keep the competition off-guard.

From a judging standpoint, the posedown is used for the last comparison between bodybuilders, but they are often not awarded points for each pose. The points awarded for the posedown are based on the judges overall opinion of the competitor. Although not as significant as the points given for the previous rounds, points earned in a posedown can boost a competitor up a place or two. Judges may not give points to a certain competitor for a posedown, but they will remember the bodybuilder in the future and that can be a plus. For the most part, posedowns are part of the show for the audience, which gives them a chance to show off to the crowd, and is the equivalent of a money shot. One of the most common and popular poses during a posedown is the most muscular pose.

In International Federation of BodyBuilding and Fitness (IFBB) professional competitions, the posedown is part of round 2 of the finals after mandatory posing. The top 6 finalists will engage in a 30 to 60 second free for all posing to music of the competition organizer's choice. This part of round 2 will not be scored. In National Physique Committee and IFBB amateur competitions, any competitor doing the "Moon Pose" on stage will be disqualified. In most amateur competitions, after the weight-class winners are announced there is a posedown among the winners of each class to determine the overall winner. The weight class winners cannot relax because they must do another posedown to win the overall. Heavyweight bodybuilders tend to be favored winners of overall posedowns, but not absolutely guaranteed.

== International Federation of Bodybuilding and Fitness Professional League (IFBB Pro League) ==
According to the IFBB Pro League rules, the following professional classes have the posedown as part of the finals: bodybuilding and classic and women's physique. The posedown is part of the finals. The finals is worth 50% of the final score. The posedown consists of the contestants performing a 60-second posedown to music of the promoter's choice. The use of vulgar, profane and/or offensive language is prohibited in the posing music. Hair may be styled for the finals and the use of props is prohibited from the finals.

=== Notable posedowns that decided the winner ===
- 2008 Ms. International
- 2005 Ms. International lightweight
- 2001 Ms. Olympia heavyweight - At the end of round 3, the scorecard had Iris Kyle, at 37 points, trailing by 5 points to Ondrea Gates, at 32 points. After the end of round 4, the combine heavyweight-lightweight posedown, both Iris and Gates were tied were both tied at 43 points. According to Ruth Silverman, there was stories that the judges thought Gates' legs were lagging, despite winning the symmetry round and earning only one second-place vote before the high and low scores were tossed out. When the judges added back in those high and low scores, Iris won the 2001 Ms. Olympia heavyweight title due to International Federation of BodyBuilding and Fitness tie-breaking rule due to her having more 1st place votes.
- 2001 Ms. International lightweight
- 1997 Ms. Olympia
