= Jose Febrillet =

American bodybuilder (born 1980)

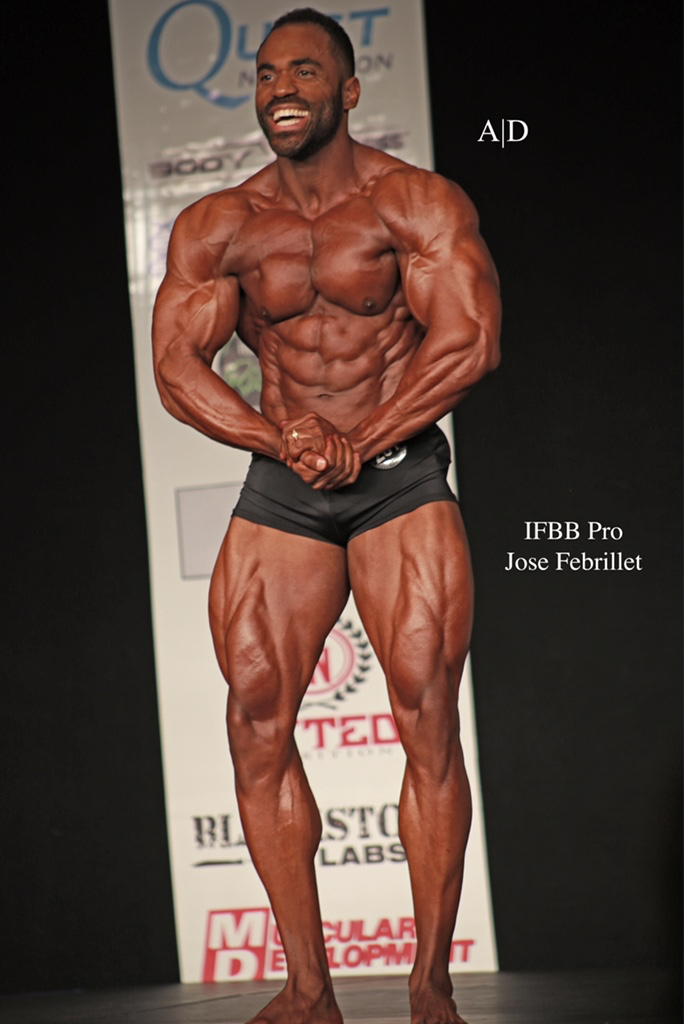
Jose Febrillet, 2016 NPC Universe Championships. Placed 1st and earned an IFBB Pro status

Jose Febrillet (born March 23, 1980) is an American IFBB professional classic physique bodybuilder. He has won multiple 1st place titles at every major NPC classic physique show since 2015.

== Competitive History ==
- 2016 NPC Universe Championships, Men's Classic Physique Masters Over 35, 1st
- 2016 NPC Universe Championships, Men's Classic Physique Class B, 6th
- 2016 NPC Atlantic States Championships, Men's Classic Physique Class B 1st
- 2016 NPC Atlantic States Championships, Men's Classic Physique Masters Over 35, 1st
- 2015 NPC Brooklyn Grand Prix, Men's Physique Novice Class A, 4th
- 2015 NPC Brooklyn Grand Prix, Men's Physique Masters, 1st
- 2015 NPC Brooklyn Grand Prix, Men's Physique Class B, 1st
