= Yolanda Hughes-Heying =

American bodybuilder

- Professional bodybuilder

Personal info
- Nickname: Goyo
- Born: October 30, 1963 (age 62); Murfreesboro, Tennessee, U.S.

Best statistics
- Height: 5 ft 6 1/2 in (1.69 m)
- Weight: In Season: 140–145 lb (64–66 kg); Off-Season: 155–164 lb (70–74 kg)

Professional (Pro) career
- Pro-debut: IFBB Ms. Olympia; 1992
- Best win: IFBB Ms. International; 1997 and 1998
- Predecessor: Kim Chizevsky-Nicholls
- Successor: Vickie Gates
- Active: Retired 1999

Yolanda R. Hughes-Heying (born October 30, 1963) is an American professional female bodybuilder from the United States.

== Biography ==
Yolanda Hughes-Heying (born Yolanda Hughes) was born in Murfreesboro, Tennessee on October 30, 1963. She was raised by her grandmother and was one of five children. Her grandmother wanted her to pursue her interest in gymnastics. As a youngster, she spent much of her time at the local youth center exploring her interests in sports and physical fitness. While attending Murfreesboro High School, she excelled academically in the areas of psychology and geography.

By her senior year in high school, Yolanda had competed at both the local and state level in track achieving various titles, mastering the 110 hurtles, 100 meters, long jump, and the 440 relay. Although her primary interest at the time was track, gymnastics allowed her to develop a sense of well-being through an inner-focus and clear determination to succeed. She pursued gymnastics by training and competing both in local and state competitions. Eventually, she aspired to compete at the national level in hopes of her ultimate dream of becoming a world-class Olympic gymnast.

== Bodybuilding career ==
=== Amateur ===
In 1981, after graduating high school, Yolanda was accepted with full scholarship to Western Kentucky University, where she continued her pursuit of both track and gymnastics. That same year during a gymnastics training session, a local bodybuilder and wrestler Hillbillie Jim, best known for his matches with the World Federation Wrestling, approached her and solicited her participation in a local women's bodybuilding competition that he was promoting. She was at first hesitant since her first love was track and gymnastics, she had not seen herself competing in the realm of women's bodybuilding. After further conversation with Jim, she soon realized that she had the potential to be on the forefront in forging a direction for women in this sport, worldwide. There was yet another concern, the upcoming competition was only four weeks away. She was rewarded with a 2nd-place finish.

In 1982, Yolanda went to California in support of her family, where she enrolled at Saddleback College. She walked onto the track team and after exhibiting her skill level received a partial scholarship in pursuit of her education. In the meantime, she continued her interest in both women's bodybuilding and gymnastics, spending most of her free time in the gym training in pursuit of her athletic goals.

In 1984, after finding that her scholarship had run out and with the pressures of additional family commitments Yolanda faced a tough decision to leave her pursuit of academics and focus on her athletic abilities. That same year, because of her achieved status through local competition, she had finally earned the right to compete in a national qualifier in women's bodybuilding. She began her rigorous training at the San Clemente Gym where she received substantial support and encouragement from the gym regulars. Her first time out brought a third-place finish and a wealth of knowledge and experience that she would later use in placing 2nd in 1991 at the USA Nationals.

While training at the San Clemente Gym, Yolanda had little time for much else in her life, until she met and eventually married Thomas Heying, who was visiting the United States from Germany. Thomas later would return to Germany followed by her a few months later. She resided with Thomas in Guetersloh, Germany. She was about the only African American amongst the community. Needless to say she was quick to adapt to the appropriate attire and customs which helped her in being welcomed throughout the community. She brought many contributions to the community including the introduction of aerobics in the gym environment. She earned her pro card by winning the World Amateur championship in 1992.

=== Professional ===
In 1997 and 1998, Yolanda placed 1st in the Ms. International competition. She competed in six Ms. Olympia contests, placing second to Kim Chizevsky-Nicholls at the 1998 Ms. Olympia. She would be featured in covers and stories in such publications as Muscle And Fitness, Flex, Female Bodybuilding, and Muscular Development.

=== Retirement ===
After coming in third place at the 1999 Ms. International, Yolanda retired from bodybuilding.

=== Contest history ===
- 1984 NPC Ironmaiden - 2nd (HW)
- 1988 NPC Los Angeles Championship - 2nd (HW)
- 1988 NPC Orange County Classic - 1st (HW & overall)
- 1988 NPC USA Championship - 6th (HW)
- 1989 NPC USA Championship - 5th (HW)
- 1990 NPC USA Championship - 4th (HW)
- 1990 NPC Nationals - 3rd (HW)
- 1991 NPC USA Championship - 2nd (HW)
- 1991 NPC Nationals - 3rd (HW)
- 1991 IFBB World Amateur - 2nd (HW)
- 1992 IFBB World Amateur - 1st (HW)
- 1992 IFBB Ms. Olympia - 8th
- 1993 Ms. International - 5th
- 1993 IFBB Ms. Olympia - 11th
- 1994 Ms. International - 3rd
- 1994 IFBB Ms. Olympia - 8th
- 1995 IFBB Ms. Olympia - 10th
- 1996 Ms. International - 4th
- 1997 Ms. International - 1st
- 1997 IFBB Ms. Olympia - 3rd
- 1998 Ms. International - 1st
- 1998 IFBB Ms. Olympia - 2nd
- 1999 Ms. International - 3rd

== Personal life ==
Yolanda currently lives in Bellingham, Washington. In 2001, she took up pole-dancing classes in Los Angeles, California. In Vancouver, Washington, Hughes trained with a pole-dancing fitness instructor, who was a Ms. World Pole Fit champion who won the best contortionist category. In 2005, she opened a special training studio called Fitness Exotica in which she offers training and lessons to customers, such as in fitness and stripping.

=== Motion picture appearance ===
Yolanda made a cameo in the 2002 film Rollerball.

Ms. International
Preceded by: Kim Chizevsky-Nicholls	First (1997)	Succeeded by: Herself
Preceded by: Herself	Second (1998)	Succeeded by: Vickie Gates
