= Kathy Segal =

American bodybuilder

- professional bodybuilder
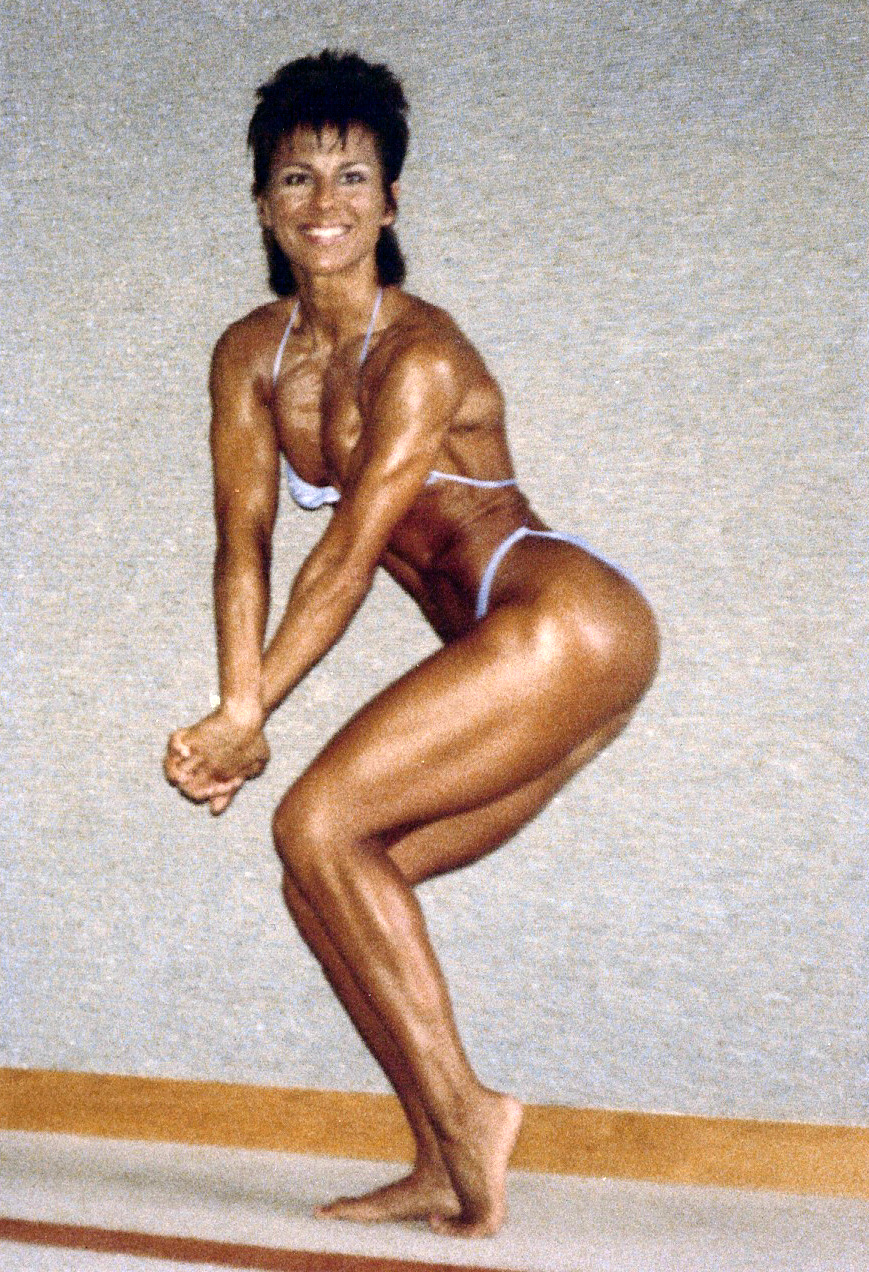

Personal info
- Born: 1952; Miami, Florida, US

Best statistics
- Height: 5 ft 4 in (1.63 m)

Professional (Pro) career
- Best win: Ms. International Champion; 1987
- Predecessor: Erika Geisen
- Successor: Cathey Palyo
- Active: Retired 1991

Kathy Segal is an American bodybuilding champion who rose to the top of the amateur ranks by winning the Ms. International Bodybuilding Championship, which was generally considered to be the second-most prestigious competition for female bodybuilders (behind only the Ms. Olympia competition).

== Early life and education ==
She was born Kathy Huddy in Miami, Florida, but her family relocated to the area of Atlantic City, New Jersey, where she was raised. She didn’t compete in sports or athletics; she attended the Sonnenfeld School of Modeling, and competed in beauty contests. In 1970, she was one of the local beauty queens who appeared in the Miss America Pageant Parade.

== Bodybuilding career ==
Kathy, having little interest in sports, got an unusually late start for a bodybuilder; she started training in her late 20s. Her commitment from the outset of her training was improved health and fitness; she was what was referred to in the late 1980s as a "natural bodybuilder" (drug and steroid-free).

She won the Ms. South Jersey Fitness contest at the age of 31, in 1983. She followed with a second win of Ms. South Jersey Fitness in 1984. In 1985 and 1986, she competed in several New Jersey contests, always achieving a podium finish.

In early 1987, she was invited to compete in the WABBA Best In The World Championship. The WABBA held the event at the Trump Castle Casino in Atlantic City, NJ. Former Mr. World, Mr. Universe, Mr. Europe Serge Nubret came from France to be the featured guest poser. World renowned fantasy and physique artist Boris Vallejo was also among the invited dignitaries. Upon arriving at the competition, she accepted an impromptu invitation from AAU Mr. America Robert "Stonewall" Jackson to compete as his partner in the couples division. Though last minute, they prepared an ad-hoc posing routine, and were judged the 3rd best bodybuilding couple in the world.

In late 1987, at age 35, she won the Ms. International contest, which was generally considered to be the second-most prestigious competition for female bodybuilders (behind only the Ms. Olympia competition).

Her final championship win came in 1991, at the age of 39, at the NPC Women's National Grand Prix.

Away from the contest stage Kathy hosted "Fitness Friday", a weekly radio feature on WMGM Radio, in the late 80’s. She is a certified personal trainer with NSCA, AFPA, SFA, AFAA, The Arthritis Foundation and Kaiser Fitness, has managed a number of health clubs and continues to support women and men who are seeking a higher level of fitness.

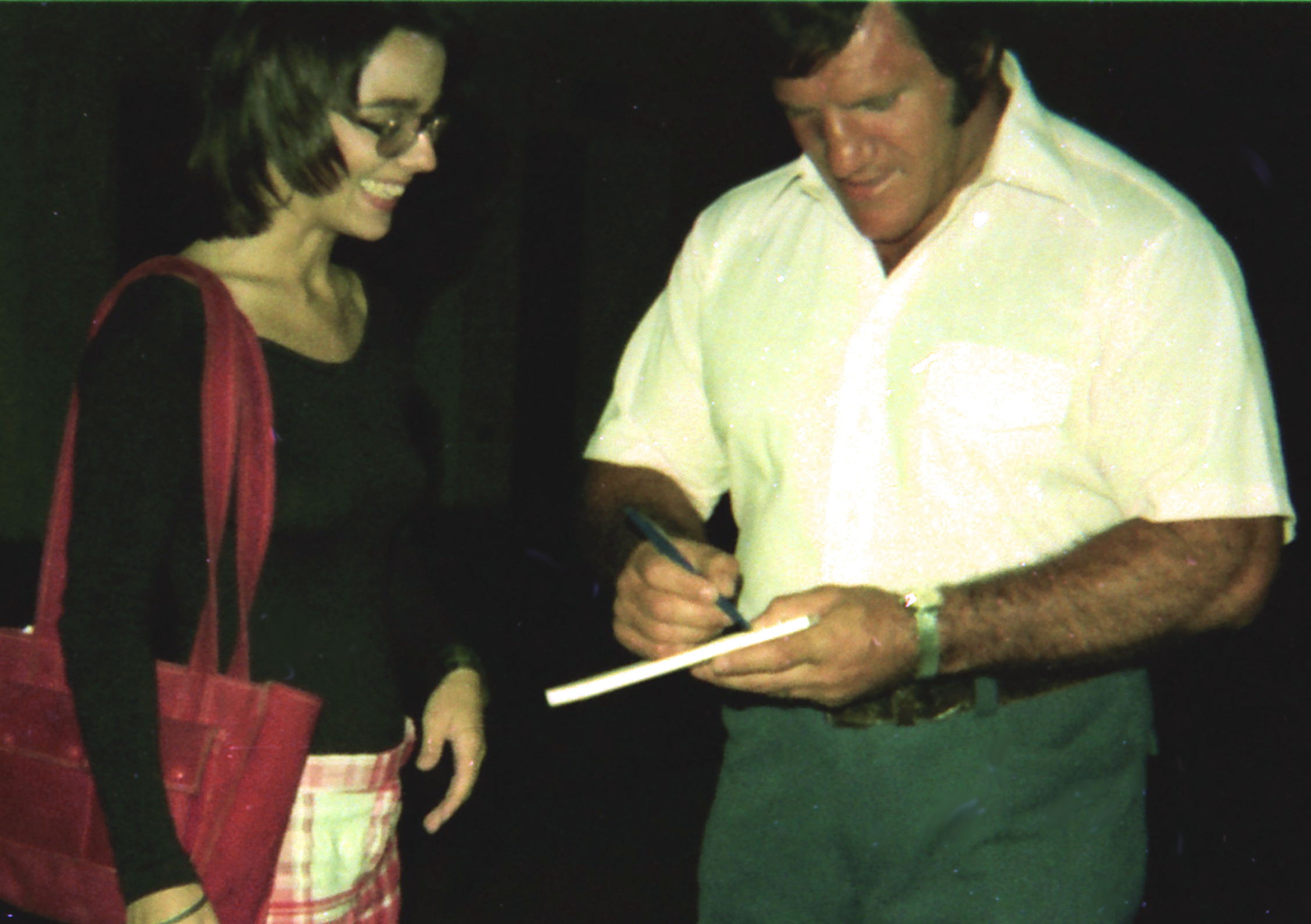
August 1974. Bruno Sammartino, "The Living Legend", signing an autograph for Kathy Segal.

== Contest history ==
- 1983 Ms. South Jersey Fitness - 1st (25-34)
- 1984 Ms. South Jersey Fitness - 1st Overall
- 1985 AAU South Jersey Championship - 2nd Overall
- 1985 NPC NJ State Championship - 3rd Overall
- 1986 AAU South Jersey Championship - 1st (Middlweight)
- 1986 IFBB Ms. International - 3rd
- 1987 WABBA Best in the World - 3rd (Couples)
- 1987 AAU Ms. International - 1st Overall
- 1991 NPC Women's National Grand Prix - 1st Overall

== Personal life ==
She is the mother of Hugo Award winning editor Stephen H. Segal and New York Administrative Law Judge Samantha L. Segal.
