= Creavalle =

Creavalle is a surname. Notable people with the surname include:

- Laura Creavalle (born 1959), Guyanese-born Canadian/American professional female bodybuilder
- Warren Creavalle (born 1990), US-born Guyanese footballer
