= Tonya Knight =

American bodybuilder (1966–2023)

- Professional bodybuilder

Personal info
- Nickname: Gold
- Born: March 24, 1966; Peculiar, Missouri, U.S.
- Died: February 7, 2023 (aged 56)

Best statistics

Professional (Pro) career
- Pro-debut: IFBB Pro World Championships; 1988
- Best win: IFBB Ms. International champion; 1991
- Predecessor: Laura Creavalle
- Successor: Anja Schreiner
- Active: Retired 1993

Tonya Knight (March 24, 1966 – February 7, 2023) was an American professional bodybuilder.

== Early life ==
Tonya Knight was born in 1966 in Peculiar, Missouri. She played volleyball and softball in school and got into bodybuilding as a teenager after seeing Rachel McLish on a magazine cover. She did her first bodybuilding show when a senior in high school and earned the right to turned pro at only 19 after winning an amateur contest in Japan.

== Bodybuilding career ==
=== Professional ===
Knight finished fourth in the 1988 Ms. Olympia, but she later admitted sending a surrogate to take a mandatory drug test administered before the event after IFBB officials presented strong evidence. In a ruling handed down in November 1989, she was suspended, stripped of her 1989 Ms. International title (which went to runner-up Jackie Paisley) and asked to return her 1989 Ms. International and 1988 Ms. Olympia prize money, totaling $12,000. After the scandal, she returned to the stage in 1991, winning the Ms. International title, this time without incident. She went on to compete in only two more pro contests, the last in 1993.

=== Legacy ===
Knight remains the only Ms. International winner to lose one of her titles. She was inducted into the 2011 IFBB Hall of Fame.

=== Contest history ===
- 1984 NPC USA Championship - 11th (LHW)
- 1985 NPC USA Championship - 6th (HW)
- 1986 NPC USA Championship - 4th (HW)
- 1988 Pro World Championship - 5th
- 1988 IFBB Ms. Olympia - 4th (later disqualified)
- 1989 Ms. International - 1st (later disqualified)
- 1991 IFBB Grand Prix Italy - 1st
- 1991 Ms. International - 1st
- 1992 Ms. International - 6th
- 1993 Jan Tana Classic - 3rd

== Personal life and death ==
Knight lived in Overland Park, Kansas. She was married to the bodybuilder John Poteat, but they divorced. She had three brothers Timothy, Todd, and Travis, and a son. Malachi.

Knight died from cancer on February 7, 2023, at age 56.

=== Television appearance ===
From 1989 to 1992, Knight was a regular on American Gladiators as the character Gold, until she left due to an injury to her left knee.

Ms. International
Preceded by: Laura Creavalle	First (1991)	Succeeded by: Anja Schreiner
