= Betty Pariso =

American professional female bodybuilder (born 1956)

- Professional bodybuilder
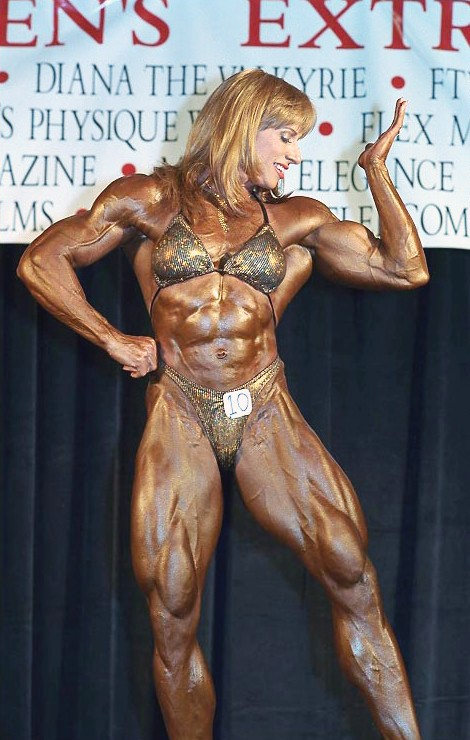
- Betty Pariso posing at the 2001 Extravaganza Strength Contest

Personal info
- Nickname: The Kid
- Born: January 29, 1956 (age 70); Cynthiana, Kentucky, U.S.

Best statistics
- Height: 5 ft 6 in (1.68 m)
- Weight: In Season: 155–168 lb (70–76 kg); Off-Season: 213–226 lb (97–103 kg)

Professional (Pro) career
- Pro-debut: IFBB Jan Tana Classic; 1996
- Best win: IFBB Jan Tana Classic heavyweight and overall; 2001
- Predecessor: Gayle Moher
- Successor: Nancy Lewis
- Active: Retired 2010

Betty Carmichael Pariso (née Slade; born January 29, 1956) is an American professional female bodybuilder. She is the oldest professional female bodybuilder to win the overall of an International Federation of Bodybuilding and Fitness Professional League (IFBB Pro League) contest at the age of 53 years old.

== Biography ==
Betty Pariso (born Betty Slade) was born in 1956 in Cynthiana, Kentucky to Harold Coleman Slade and Dorothy Florence Slade. She has two sisters, Kay and Ann, and a brother, Terry. She grew up on a farm, enjoying a healthy and athletic lifestyle that included much volleyball and track. Her athletic prowess in the field even attracted the attention of university scouts. Ping-pong was also a fixture of her childhood. She grew up without television, but often visited her grandmother to enjoy her programs as a child. She became a part-time model and a minister's wife in her earlier years.

== Bodybuilding career ==
=== Amateur ===
Betty started weight training in her early 30s to stay fit and add weight to what she thought was too much of a "stick figure" type of body. She started attending a women's gym and a male came up to her and asked if she was interested in bodybuilding and took her to a "real gym". Within six months, she began competing in bodybuilding and was able to achieve pro card status at the 1996 NPC Nationals. This was a very high achievement for Pariso as by doing this she had become the oldest (at the age of 40) woman to earn an IFBB Pro card.

=== Professional ===
As a professional competitor, Betty's main goal was to win a pro show as the only competitor over the age of fifty. She became one of the most successful competitors in professional female bodybuilding by reaching the top six in almost every competition she has entered. In 2001, she won the heavyweight class at the Jan Tana Classic, which made this the first pro win of her career. There was no overall champion in that contest. She had to withdraw from the 2009 Ms. International due to a high fever. Later she went on to win her second pro title, the 2009 Tampa Bay Pro. Her coaches was professional bodybuilders George Farah, Dexter Jackson and Branch Warren, along with his wife, Trish Warren.

=== Retirement ===
After the 2010 Phoenix Pro contest, Betty retired from bodybuilding at the age of 54.

=== Legacy ===
In October 1996, Betty won the NPC Nationals and became the first woman in history at age 40 to earn her IFBB professional status. In 2006, she won the 2006 female athlete of the year at the Flex Awards for her outstanding achievement in the industry. In 2009, she achieved her goal of became the first female bodybuilder above the age of 50 years to win an IFBB professional competition, by winning the 2009 Tampa Bay Pro. She is currently IFBB's Athlete Representative in women's bodybuilding, where she has used her position to suggest a weight class system for the professional bodybuilders and a new division contest for women bodybuilders and fitness/figure competitors.

In 2010, Betty received LifeTime Achievement Award at Europa Dallas. The rock band Pariso, formed in 2009, is named after Betty Pariso. She was the world's oldest active female bodybuilder while competing.

=== Contest history ===
- 1992 AAU Ms America - 2nd (MT)
- 1992 Lee Labrata - 1st
- 1993 Lone Star - 1st
- 1993 NPC Junior Nationals - 13th (HW)
- 1994 NPC Junior Nationals - 1st (MW)
- 1994 NPC USA Championships - 4th (MW)
- 1995 NPC USA Championships - 3rd (HW)
- 1996 NPC Nationals - 1st (HW)
- 1996 NPC USA Championships - 3rd (HW)
- 1997 IFBB Jan Tana Pro Classic - 15th
- 1998 IFBB Jan Tana Pro Classic - 5th
- 1998 IFBB Ms. International - 11th
- 1999 IFBB Jan Tana Pro Classic - 4th
- 1999 IFBB Ms. International - 14th
- 1999 IFBB Pro Extravaganza - 4th
- 1999 IFBB World Pro Championships - 5th
- 2000 IFBB Jan Tana Pro Classic - 2nd (HW)
- 2000 IFBB Ms. International - 6th (HW)
- 2001 IFBB Jan Tana Pro Classic - 1st (HW)
- 2001 IFBB Ms. International - 5th (HW)
- 2001 IFBB Ms. Olympia - 6th (HW)
- 2002 IFBB Jan Tana Pro Classic - 2nd (HW)
- 2002 IFBB Ms. International - 5th (HW)
- 2003 IFBB Ms. International - 2nd (HW)
- 2003 IFBB Ms. Olympia - 6th (HW)
- 2004 IFBB Ms. International - 3rd (HW)
- 2004 IFBB Night of Champions - 2nd (HW)
- 2004 IFBB Show of Strength Pro Championship - 2nd (HW)
- 2004 IFBB Ms. Olympia - 4th (HW)
- 2005 IFBB Ms. International - 3rd (HW)
- 2005 IFBB Charlotte Pro Championships - 2nd (HW)
- 2005 IFBB Ms. Olympia - 8th
- 2006 IFBB Ms. International - 5th
- 2006 IFBB Atlantic City Pro - 5th
- 2006 IFBB Ms. Olympia - 6th
- 2007 IFBB Ms. International - 5th
- 2007 IFBB Ms. Olympia - 6th
- 2008 IFBB Ms. International - 4th
- 2008 IFBB Ms. Olympia - 7th
- 2009 IFBB New York Pro Championships - 2nd
- 2009 IFBB Tampa Bay Pro - 1st
- 2009 IFBB Ms. Olympia - 6th
- 2010 IFBB Phoenix Pro - 2nd
- 2010 IFBB Ms. International - 5th

== Personal life ==
Betty currently lives in North Richland Hills, Texas. She has been remarried to Ed Pariso since the early 1990s. She has a daughter named Lacye Carmichael, and a son named Justin Carmichael, from her first marriage. She also has two grandchildren, James and Logan Carmichael.

== See also ==
- Albert Beckles (oldest professional male bodybuilder to win an International Federation of Bodybuilding and Fitness Professional League (IFBB Pro League) contest)
- Juliette Bergmann (oldest Ms. Olympia overall and lightweight winner)
- Lenda Murray (oldest Ms. Olympia heavyweight winner)
- Yaxeni Oriquen-Garcia (oldest Ms. International overall and heavyweight winner)
- Valentina Chepiga (oldest Ms. International lightweight winner)
- Helle Trevino (oldest Ms. Rising Phoenix winner)
- Sheila Bleck (Oldest Ms. Rising Phoenix best poser award winner)
