= Th-resa Bostick =

American bodybuilder

- Professional bodybuilder

Personal info
- Nickname: The Strong Powerful Beauty, Nubian Goddess
- Born: 1969; Birmingham, Alabama, U.S.

Best statistics
- Height: 5 ft 3 in (1.60 m)
- Weight: 155 lb (70 kg)

Professional (Pro) career
- Pro-debut: IFBB Jan Tana Classic; 2000
- Best win: IFBB Jan Tana Classic champion; 2000
- Predecessor: None
- Successor: Betty Pariso
- Active: Retired 2007

Th-resa Bostick (born 1969) is an American professional female bodybuilder.

== Bodybuilding career ==
=== Amateur ===
At the 1999 NPC USA Championships, Bostick won the heavyweight class and overall and thus won her IFBB pro card.

=== Professional ===
Bostick won the heavyweight class during her pro-debut at the 2000 IFBB Jan Tana Classic.

=== Contest history ===
- 1991 NPC Extravaganza - 6th (HW)
- 1993 NPC Ohio South District - 1st (HW)
- 1995 NPC Battle of Championship - 1st (HW and overall)
- 1995 NPC Nationals - 3rd (HW)
- 1996 NPC Nationals - 9th (HW)
- 1998 NPC Nationals - 9th (HW)
- 1998 IFBB North American Championships - 5th (HW)
- 1999 Jan Tana Amateur Grand Prix - 1st (HW and overall)
- 1999 NPC USA Championships - 1st (HW and overall)
- 2000 IFBB Jan Tana Pro Classic - 1st (HW)
- 2000 IFBB Ms. Olympia - 7th (HW)
- 2001 IFBB Ms. International - 9th (HW)
- 2007 IFBB Europa Supershow - 2nd (HW)
