= Erika Geisen =

Australian bodybuilder

Erika Giesen
- Professional bodybuilder

Personal info
- Born: Germany

Best statistics

Professional (Pro) career
- Pro-debut: IFBB Ms. International, 1986
- Best win: IFBB Ms. International champion, 1986
- Predecessor: None
- Successor: Cathey Palyo
- Active: Retired 1988

Erika Giesen is a professional bodybuilder from Australia.

== Bodybuilding career ==
=== Amateur ===
- 1983: South Pacific - first place
- 1983: Miss Asia - first place
- 1984: Australian - first place
- 1986: Australasia - first place

=== Professional ===
Giesen's greatest success was winning the first Ms. International contest in 1986.

=== Retirement ===
Giesen runs now a cattle station with her husband in Queensland Australia.

=== Legacy ===
Giesen was the first bodybuilder to win the Ms. International. She is currently the most successful Australian bodybuilder of all time.

== Contest history ==
- 1984 World Amateur Championship - 2nd (LW)
- 1985 IFBB World Games - 4th (LW)
- 1986 Ms. International - 1st
- 1986 IFBB Ms. Olympia - 11th
- 1988 Ms. International - 6th

Ms. International
Preceded by: -	First (1986)	Succeeded by: Cathey Palyo
