= Fannie Barrios =

Venezuelan bodybuilder

Fannie Josefina Barrios
- Professional bodybuilder

Personal info
- Born: May 30, 1964; Caracas, Venezuela
- Died: August 7, 2005 (aged 41)

Best statistics
- Weight: In Season: 124–128 lb (56–58 kg); Off Season: 150–155 lb (68–70 kg)

Professional (Pro) career
- Best win: Jan Tana Classic MW Champion; 2001
- Active: Retired 2005

Fannie Barrios (1964–2005) was a professional female bodybuilder from Venezuela.

== Biography ==
Fannie Josefina Barrios was born in Caracas, Venezuela on May 30, 1964. She was the Venezuelan champion in 1997 and 1998. She earned her pro card in 1998 when she won a contest called Absolute Center of the Americas in San Salvador. Her professional debut was at the 1999 Jan Tana Classic. In 2000, she moved to Florida with her husband, Alex Ramirez, and her daughter, Johadynis. There, she worked as a personal trainer and chef in the Miami area. She was a two-time class winner at the Jan Tana Classic, winning the middleweight class in 2001 and the lightweight class in 2002. Her final contest was the 2005 New York Pro Championship on May 21, where she finished in third place.

On August 7, 2005, Barrios died at approximately 2 a.m. of an apparent stroke. She had spent the previous day helping out backstage at the NPC Southern States contest in Fort Lauderdale, where her husband was competing.

== Contest history ==
- 1999 Jan Tana Classic – 17th
- 1999 Women's Pro Extravaganza – 11th
- 2000 Jan Tana Classic – 6th (MW)
- 2001 Jan Tana Classic – 1st (MW)
- 2001 IFBB Ms. Olympia – 8th (LW)
- 2002 IFBB Ms. International – 3rd (LW)
- 2002 Jan Tana Classic – 1st (LW)
- 2002 IFBB Ms. Olympia – 3rd (LW)
- 2002 GNC Show of Strength – 3rd (LW)
- 2003 IFBB Ms. International – 6th (LW)
- 2003 Night of Champions – 4th (LW)
- 2003 IFBB Ms. Olympia – 6th (LW)
- 2004 IFBB Ms. International – 4th (LW)
- 2004 Night of Champions – 6th (LW)
- 2005 IFBB Ms. International – 6th (LW)
- 2005 New York Pro – 3rd (LW)
