= Denise Masino =

American bodybuilder

- Professional bodybuilder

Personal info
- Born: Brooklyn, New York, U.S.

Best statistics
- Height: 5 ft 3 in (1.60 m)
- Weight: On-season: 129 lb (59 kg); Off-season: 138 lb (63 kg)

Professional (Pro) career
- Pro-debut: Jan Tana Classic; 1996
- Best win: 2003 Night of Champions

Denise Masino is an American professional female bodybuilder and model.

== Early life and bodybuilding ==
Born in Brooklyn, New York of Puerto Rican descent, the 5'2" Masino won her pro card by winning the lightweight class at the 1995 NPC Nationals. She competed as a professional through 2007, and was the 2003 Night of Champions winner.

== Model career ==
Starting from early 1996, Masino was featured in various prominent fitness and bodybuilding magazines. She was a two-time centerfold in Flex Power & Sizzle and voted the "sexiest bodybuilder alive" by Iron Man magazine. She was also included in Flex's 1997 Annual Swimsuit issue and in their Fantasy Lingerie issue. In 1997, along with her then-husband and trainer Robert Masino, she founded Muscle Elegance, a magazine that features erotic pictorials of female bodybuilders and where Denise is featured as the main model. The magazine also produces a line of videos and the website Muscle Pinups.

Her feature film debut in the vampire movie, Blood + Kisses (originally titled Kiss of the Vampire as shown in trailers), premiered in film festivals in 2005, but so far remains unreleased. She is currently featured in the documentary feature, "Adventures of Miss Fit," which had its film festival premiere in 2016.

== Personal life ==
Masino is a registered Republican who has voted out of party and identifies herself as a fiscal conservative. She is currently married to her husband Gregg, and was previously married to Robert Masino for fourteen years. She currently lives in Fort Myers, Florida.

== Contest history ==
- 1994 National Physique Committee (NPC) Ms. Naples - 1st (Lightweight (LW) & Overall (OA))
- 1994 NPC Ms. Sarasota - 1st (LW & OA)
- 1994 NPC Ms. West Coast - 1st (LW & OA)
- 1994 NPC West Coast Grand Prix - 1st
- 1994 Ms. Jr. Florida - 1st (LW, Mixed pairs (MP) & OA)
- 1994 NPC Nationals - 8th (MW)
- 1995 NPC Ms. Florida - 1st (LW & OA)
- 1995 NPC Nationals - 1st (LW & MP with David Marinelli)
- 1996 International Federation of BodyBuilders (IFBB) Jan Tana Classic - 6th
- 1997 IFBB Jan Tana Classic - 6th
- 1997 IFBB Ms. International - 13th
- 1998 IFBB Jan Tana Classic - 8th
- 1998 IFBB Ms. International - 7th (Later disqualified)
- 1999 IFBB Ms. International - 7th
- 1999 IFBB Pro World Championship - 4th
- 2000 IFBB Ms. International - 4th (LW)
- 2001 IFBB Ms. International - 5th (LW)
- 2002 IFBB Ms. International - 6th (LW)
- 2003 IFBB Ms. International - 2nd (LW)
- 2003 IFBB Night of Champions - 1st (LW & overall)
- 2003 IFBB Ms. Olympia - 3rd (LW)
- 2004 IFBB Ms. International - 3rd (LW)
- 2004 IFBB IFBB Ms. Olympia - 2nd (LW)
- 2007 IFBB Professional League Ms. International - 12th

== See also ==
- List of Puerto Ricans
