= Anja Schreiner =

German bodybuilder

- Professional bodybuilder

Personal info
- Nickname: The Angel
- Born: February 5, 1967 (age 59); Germany

Best statistics
- Height: 5 ft 7 in (1.70 m)
- Weight: 135 lb (61 kg)

Professional (Pro) career
- Pro-debut: IFBB Pro World Championship; 1989
- Best win: IFBB Ms. International champion; 1992
- Predecessor: Tonya Knight
- Successor: Kim Chizevsky-Nicholls
- Active: Retired 1992

Anja Schreiner (née Albrecht; born February 5, 1967) is a professional female bodybuilder from Germany. Schreiner won the 1991 Ms. International contest.

== Bodybuilding career ==
=== Amateur ===
She began lifting weights to combat scoliosis in her adolescence.

=== Professional ===
Anja came second at the 1991 Ms. International, when she was beaten by Tonya Knight who scored 32 points to Anja's 30 points. Anja won the Miss International title in 1992.

=== Retirement ===
Anja retired from competitive bodybuilding in 1992, but continued to appear at FIBO and Olympia events.

=== Legacy ===
Currently she is one of the most successful German bodybuilders of all time, along Anja Langer or Achim Albrecht.

=== Contest history ===
- 1986 Miss Germany - 1st
- 1989 Pro World Championship - 21st
- 1989 Ms. International - 11th
- 1990 Ms. International - 3rd
- 1990 IFBB Ms. Olympia - 3rd
- 1991 Ms. International - 2nd
- 1991 IFBB Ms. Olympia - 8th
- 1992 Ms. International - 1st
- 1992 IFBB Ms. Olympia - 6th

== Filmography ==
After retiring from bodybuilding, Anja had several small roles in tv shows both in the USA and Germany. Her feature film debut was to be a small role alongside Cory Everson in "The Girlfriend from Outer Space", filmed in 1989, but the film was never released.

=== Acting credits ===
- Soldier of Fortune, Inc.: Scorned (1998, TV series episode)
- Die Kommissarin: Falsche Opfer (2000, TV series episode)
- Personal Trainer (2001 german film)

Ms. International
Preceded by: Tonya Knight	First (1992)	Succeeded by: Kim Chizevsky-Nicholls
