= Nancy Lewis (bodybuilder) =

American bodybuilder

- Professional bodybuilder

Personal info
- Born: United States

Best statistics

Professional (Pro) career
- Pro-debut: IFBB Ms. International; 1992
- Best win: IFBB Jan Tana Pro Classic middleweight and overall champion; 2002
- Predecessor: Gayle Moher; Fannie Barrios
- Successor: Helle Trevino; Dayana Cadeau
- Active: Since 1985

Nancy Lewis is a professional female bodybuilder from the United States. She earned her pro card by winning the overall title at the 1991 NPC USA Championship. She competed in a number of professional contests from 1992 to 1998 with a series of solid placings, but no titles. Then after a four-year retirement, she returned to competition in 2002, winning the overall title at the Jan Tana Classic.

== Contest history ==
- 1985 NPC Nationals - 8th (MW)
- 1987 NPC USA Championship - 5th (LHW)
- 1988 NPC California Championship - 1st (HW)
- 1990 NPC Nationals - 2nd (MW)
- 1991 NPC USA Championship - 1st (MW & overall)
- 1992 Ms. International - 5th
- 1992 Jan Tana Classic - 2nd
- 1992 IFBB Ms. Olympia - 14th
- 1993 Jan Tana Classic - 2nd
- 1993 IFBB Ms. Olympia - 13th
- 1995 Jan Tana Classic - 3rd
- 1995 Grand Prix Prague - 4th
- 1995 IFBB Ms. Olympia - 10th
- 1996 IFBB Ms. Olympia - 6th
- 1996 Ms. International - 8th
- 1997 IFBB Ms. Olympia - 10th
- 1997 Ms. International - 8th
- 1998 Ms. International - 4th
- 2002 Jan Tana Classic - 1st (MW & overall)
- 2002 IFBB Ms. Olympia - 6th (HW)
- 2003 Ms. International - 7th (LW)
- 2004 GNC Show of Strength - 1st (LW)
- 2004 IFBB Ms. Olympia - 4th (LW)
- 2009 Atlantic City Pro - 11th
- 2009 New York Pro Championships - 14th
- 2010 New York Pro Championships - 7th
- 2012 Tampa Pro Championships - 6th
- 2012 Chicago Pro Championships - 6th
