= Brenda Raganot =

American professional female bodybuilder (born 1966)

- Professional bodybuilder

Personal info
- Born: September 8, 1966 (age 59); Annapolis, Maryland, U.S.

Best statistics
- Height: 5 ft 3 in (1.60 m)
- Weight: In Season: 135 lb (61 kg); Off-Season: 150–160 lb (68–73 kg)

Professional (Pro) career
- Pro-debut: IFBB Pro Extravanganza; 1998
- Best win: IFBB Ms. International lightweight champion; 2000 and 2005
- Predecessor: None; Dayana Cadeau
- Successor: Dayana Cadeau; None
- Active: Since 1984

Brenda Raganot (born September 8, 1966) is an American professional female bodybuilder.

== Bodybuilding career ==
=== Amateur ===
In 1984, Raganot began training as a bodybuilder in high school. She was inspired after watching the film Pumping Iron 2, which featured bodybuilder Rachel McLish. In 1991, she began training under bodybuilder Debbie Houck, whom she credits with helping her progress from the amateur level to the professional ranks. Brenda earned her pro card in 1998 when she won both the middleweight and overall titles at the NPC Nationals.

=== Professional ===
Raganot alternated between the lightweight and heavyweight classes since weight classes were introduced at the pro level in 2000. She has been one of the top pros in recent years, with her best results being lightweight class wins at the Ms. International in 2000 and 2005.

=== Contest history ===
- 1993 NPC USA Championship - 3rd (MW)
- 1994 North American - 1st (HW)
- 1995 NPC Nationals - 2nd (MW)
- 1996 NPC USA Championship - 4th (HW)
- 1997 NPC Nationals - 2nd (MW)
- 1998 NPC Nationals - 1st (MW and overall)
- 1999 Pro Extravanganza - 2nd
- 1999 IFBB Ms. Olympia - 9th
- 2000 Ms. International - 1st (LW)
- 2000 IFBB Ms. Olympia - 2nd (LW)
- 2001 Ms. International - 2nd (LW)
- 2001 IFBB Ms. Olympia - 4th (LW)
- 2003 Ms. International - 3rd (HW)
- 2004 Ms. International - 5th (HW)
- 2005 Ms. International - 1st (LW)
- 2005 IFBB Ms. Olympia - 5th
- 2006 IFBB Ms. Olympia - 15th
- 2007 Sacramento Pro - 3rd (HW)
- 2007 Atlantic City Pro - 12th (HW)
- 2008 Ms. International - 5th
- 2008 IFBB Ms. Olympia - 12th
- 2009 IFBB Ms. International 11th
- 2009 IFBB New York Women's Pro - 8th
- 2009 IFBB Atlantic City Pro - 4th
- 2010 IFBB Ms. International - 10th

=== Best statistics ===
- Biceps - 15 1/2 inches (39 cm)
- Calves - 15 1/2 inches (39 cm)
- Chest - 44 inches (110 cm)
- Height - 5 ft 3 in (160 cm)
- On season weight - 135 lb (61 kg)
- Quads - 24 inches (61 cm)
- Waist - 26 inches (66 cm)

== Personal life ==
She currently lives in Seattle, Washington. She is married. She is a Christian. She currently works as a US postal clerk.

Ms. International
Preceded by: -	First (2000)	Succeeded by: Dayana Cadeau
Preceded by: Dayana Cadeau	Second (2005)	Succeeded by: -
