= Ms. International =

Female bodybuilding contest

- Status: Defunct
- Genre: IFBB Professional League professional female bodybuilding (2005 & 1989 – 2013) International Federation of BodyBuilding and Fitness (IFBB) professional female bodybuilding (1987 & 1989 – 2004)
- Frequency: Annually
- Venue: Greater Columbus Convention Center Arnold Fitness Expo; 400 North High St. Columbus, Ohio, United States of America 43215-2096 (Prejudging) National Veterans Memorial and Museum Auditorium; 300 West Broad Street, United States of America 43215-2761 (Finals)
- Coordinates: 39.961944°N 83.008056°W (National Veterans Memorial and Museum Auditorium)
- Years active: 40
- Inaugurated: 1986
- Most recent: 2013 Ms. International
- Previous event: 2012 Ms. International
- Next event: None
- Participants: 14 invited IFBB Professional League professional female bodybuilders (mean; 2005 & 1989 – 2013) 18 invited IFBB professional female bodybuilders (mean; 1987 & 1989 – 2004)
- Attendance: 175,000 attendees (2013)
- Capacity: 23,140 people (Greater Columbus Convention Center Exhibit Hall Theater) 3,916 people (National Veterans Memorial and Museum Auditorium)
- Area: International
- Major events: Spectator sport
- Promoter: James J. Lorimer
- Organizer: IFBB Professional League (2005 & 1989 – 2013) IFBB (1987 & 1989 – 2004)
- People: Iris Kyle; Yaxeni Oriquen-Garcia; Ondrea Gates; Laura Creavalle; Kim Chizevsky-Nicholls; Yolanda Hughes-Heying; Erika Geisen; Cathey Palyo; Tonya Knight; Jackie Paisley; Anja Schreiner; Brenda Raganot; Dayana Cadeau; Valentina Chepiga; Catherine LeFrançois; Arnold Schwarzenegger
- Member: Arnold Sports Festival (1989 – 2013)
- Website: web.archive.org/web/20130602024148/http://www.arnoldsportsfestival.com/home/sports-and-events/ms-international.html

The Ms. International female bodybuilding contest was considered to be the second-most prestigious competition for female bodybuilders (second only to the Ms. Olympia competition), from its inception in 1986 through to its final staging in 2013. It was first held in 1986 by the International Federation of BodyBuilders (IFBB). In 1987, the IFBB allowed the Amateur Athletic Union (AAU) to sanction the Ms. International as an amateur event. In 1988, the contest was again sanctioned by the IFBB. From 1989 the contest was part of the Arnold Sports Festival.

The top all-time winners are Iris Kyle with seven titles and followed by Yaxeni Oriquen-Garcia with five titles. The only amateur to win the overall title was Kathy Segal.

In 2013 the IFBB announced it would drop Ms. International from the 2014 IFBB Pro Schedule.

== History ==
=== 1986 – 1988 ===
The first Ms. International was held in 1986, and was sanctioned by the International Federation of BodyBuilders (I.F.B.B.). The contest was held in conjunction with the men's event, which was called the IFBB Pro World Championship. Ben Weider proclaimed that the top six finishers would qualify for IFBB pro status, and be invited to compete at the 1986 IFBB Pro World in Toronto. The 1986 and 1988 Ms. Internationals were designated as pro-am contests, and top amateurs were also invited to compete. In 1987, Ms. International was an amateur event sanctioned by the AAU. In 1988, Jim Lorimer and Arnold Schwarzenegger felt the women's competition should become a regular event along with the men's.

=== 1989 – 1999 ===
Since 1989, the men's Pro World Championship was renamed the Arnold Schwarzenegger Classic and the Ms. International become part of The Arnold Classic Weekend. That same year Tonya Knight had to forfeit both her placing and prize money from the 1988 and 1989 Ms. International when it was found out that she used someone else to take her drug test at the 1989 Ms. Olympia. The first narrow victory came in 1991 when Tonya Knight topped Anja Schreiner by a score of 30 to 32. There has been some controversy at the 1992 Ms. International. Anja Schreiner and Paula Bircumshaw both had the same body height, however, Paula had much more muscle and weight (162 lbs). The judges relegated her to eighth place and did not, as custom, called out the top ten competitors on stage before announcing the winners. Instead, they only announced the top six competitors on stage in order to prevent Paula back on stage. The audience rioted over this decision, and changed Paula's name. Paula did come back on stage only to give the judges the middle finger. Because of this, she was given a year's suspension. In 1996, Kim Chizevsky-Nicholls became the first to win both Ms. International and Ms. Olympia in the same year.

At the 1995 Ms. International, Laura Creavalle won her third Ms. International title. This was her second consecutive Ms. International title, which was a first for any female or male bodybuilder winner of the Ms. International or the Arnold Classic. Arnold Schwarzenegger, a commentator at the contest, commented that Laura Creavalle's ribs, deltoids, latissimus, trapezius and lower back are chiseled and well developed, along with her back, thighs, calves and biceps being developed. He noted she was 151 lb (68 kg). He also thought her posing was "right on the money", with some of her poses being directed to the audience and some of the poses being directed to the judges, and thought she had a great chance of winning. Commenting about her back, he thought she had great rear and side deltoid development and that her back muscles were the best of any of the contestants.

At the 1997 Ms. International, the reigning Ms. International Kim Chizevsky chose not to defend her title, instead opting to focusing on the 1997 Ms. Olympia, allowing Yolanda Hughes to win her first Ms. International title. Both Arnold Schwarzenegger and Anja Schreiner were commentators on the contest. Arnold, commenting about Yolanda, brought up her thigh and back development, the separation between her shoulders and arms and that she was very well proportioned. Anja stated the average bodyfat of a professional female bodybuilder was 5-10% for a contest. She added that Yolanda lost a little bit of size, coming in at 160 lb (73 kg), coming into the 1997 Ms. International, but gained a lot of symmetry and muscle quality from losing size. Anja also commented that Yolanda had deep separations in her thighs, a small waist and an all over package.

At the 1998 Ms. International, Lesa Lewis, Gayle Moher and Denise Masino were disqualified after their diuretic tests found that they tested positive.

=== 2000 – 2005 ===
In 2000, the International Federation of BodyBuilding and Fitness (IFBB) introduced two major changes to the professional female bodybuilding division. The first change was the introduction of weight classes (lightweight and heavyweight) and the second change was the new judging guidelines for presentations were introduced. A letter to the competitors from Jim Manion (chairman of the Professional Judges Committee) stated that women would be judged on healthy appearance, face, makeup, and skin tone. The criteria given in Manion's letter included the statement "symmetry, presentation, separations, and muscularity BUT NOT TO THE EXTREME!"

At the 2000 Ms. International, Ondrea "Vickie" Gates won the heavyweight and overall Ms. International title, while Brenda Raganot won the lightweight Ms. International title. This was Vickie's 2nd overall and consecutive Ms. International title. Of the three IFBB professional contests held in 2000, only the Ms. International had an overall title. Due to the growth in attendance at the Arnold Sports Festival, the EXPO opened at the Greater Columbus Convention Center instead of the National Veterans Memorial and Museum.

According to Gene Hwang's 2000 Arnold Classic Report, he commented that there wasn't the usual gasping from the audience as the heavyweight class took stage, as they weren't as large and ripped in the past contests, due to Jim Manion's bodybuilding criteria letter. He noted that overall the competitors looked smaller and smoother. He also stated that the new weight class formant had inconsistency between the winners of the lightweight and heavyweight classes and stated that he couldn't easily identify why they won. He commented that the heavyweights had more mass and individual parts while the lightweights were smaller, but had a arguably more balanced physique. He finished by stating that the loudest boos from the audience came when Andrulla Blanchette was announced as 2nd in the lightweight class.

According to Bill Dobbins, it was later revealed that Iris Kyle and Tazzie Columb were both disqualified from the 2000 Ms. International due to failing their diuretic tests and he speculated that it was due to Jim Manion's bodybuilding criteria letter. He described the contest as more of a beauty contest than a bodybuilding contest. He commented that those smaller and smoother tended to be rewarded, while those showing up harder and more muscular were penalized. He finished by stating that Iris should have won the heavyweight class and Andrualla Blanchette should have won the lightweight class. He also complained about the lightening at the event.

At the 2001 Ms. International, going into the 2001 Ms. International lightweight posedown, Brenda lead Dayana by a score of 22 to 25, but after the posedown, Dayana beaten Brenda by a score of 30 to 32, the 2nd two point victory in Ms. International history. Ondrea won the heavyweight and overall Ms. International title, while Dayana Cadeau dethroned the reigning Ms. International lightweight Brenda. This was Ondrea' 3rd overall and 2nd heavyweight Ms. International title and Dayana's 1st lightweight Ms. International title. This was Ondrea's 3rd consecutive overall Ms. International title win, along with her 2nd consecutive heavyweight Ms. International title win, beating Laura Creavalle's and Yolanda Hughes-Heying's two consecutive overall Ms. International title wins and Kenneth Wheeler's two consecutive overall Arnold Classic title wins.

In Bill Dobbin's 2001 Ms. International - Contest Report, he commented that Ondrea attempted to conform as much as possible to the IFBB judging "guidelines" and this has severely compromised the quality of her physique since the 1999 Ms. Olympia. He added that compared to Iris, Ondrea had an excellent upper body, especially her arms, but had no legs compared to Iris. He described the decision by the judges to award Ondrea the title over Iris as simply wrong and possibly politically motivated. Talking about the lightweights, he noted that historically Dayana normally competed as a heavyweight. He stated the reason Dayana beat Brenda was due to Dayana being more muscular than her. In Gene Hwang's 2001 Arnold Classic weekend report, he commented that the more muscular and ripped competitors were not rewarded by the judges during the first callouts of the symmetry round. He also stated the Dayana made noticeable improvements over her previous showings and called her back "tremendous".

In December 2001, Andrulla Blanchette was contacted by Wayne DeMilia about her plans to compete at the 2002 Ms. International. Jim Lorimer, co-promoter of the Ms. International, had invited her. On February 12, 2002, she arrived in New York. On February 20, 2002, she called Wayne that morning, prior to departing for Columbus, Ohio, to remind him to bring her 2000 Ms. Olympia gold medal to the 2002 Ms. International. The original gold medal was being replaced because it engraved the wrong name on it. He was unavailable, so she left a voicemail for him. He returned the call sometime later and told her the promoter had removed her name from the competitor list that morning. He said he had not been informed of her travel plans and was not aware that she would be competing at the contest. On his advice, Andrulla Blanchette called Jim who was quite concerned since they had used her photograph for the 2002 Ms. International's promotion. She told him that she can be reached via email or phone should there have been any need to contact her. He told her call Wayne. She waited for a reply and heard nothing. She flew to Columbus, Ohio.

On February 21, 2002, that evening, Andrulla Blanchette meet Wayne DeMilia and Jim Lorimer outside the contestant meeting. She was told she would not be allowed to complete at the 2002 Ms. International because she was required to use the IFBB assigned travel agent as a way to be reimbursed. Due to the misunderstanding, she was willing to cover her own expenses. Wayne then mentioned the contract he had not received and told her she would have to pay a fine of $5,000. Later that evening, officials said they would speak to him on her behalf. She waited for a reply, heard nothing and went to bed. On February 22, 2002, that morning, she meet him in the hotel lobby and informed her that paying the fine was no longer an option because she could not come up with the money in the time to compete. She assured him that she could, but he pointed to the fact that she had not been weighed in the night before. He told her that should could not compete. She watched the contest from the audience with the rest of the fans who came to see her compete.

In 2004, Iris Kyle won her first heavyweight and overall Ms. Intentional. On 6 December 2004, IFBB Professional Division Vice Chairman Jim Manion issued a memo introducing the so-called '20 percent rule' to all IFBB professional female athletes. It read, "For aesthetics and health reasons, the IFBB Professional Division requests that female athletes in Bodybuilding, Fitness and Figure decrease the amount of muscularity by a factor of 20%. This request for a 20% decrease in the amount of muscularity applies to those female athletes whose physiques require the decrease regardless of whether they compete in Bodybuilding, Fitness or Figure. All professional judges have been advised of the proper criteria for assessing female physiques." Needless to say the directive created quite a stir, and left many women wondering if they were one of "those female athletes whose physiques require the decrease".

At the 2005 Ms. International, both Iris and Dayana Cadeau both did not attend to defend their titles. Yaxeni Oriquen-Garcia won her 3rd overall and heavyweight Ms. International title and Brenda Raganot won her 2nd lightweight Ms. International title. Nancy Lewis could not compete due to medical complications that arose before the contest and she had to pull out because of that. Paulina Talus had to go to the hospital and was not able to compete at finals. According to both Bill Dobbins and Gene Hwang, the 20% rule didn't seem to affect bodybuilding judging criteria at the 2005 Ms. International and judges rewarded bigger and harder women. Bill described the lighting at prejudging as "best minimal" and described it as "bright enough to see the competitors but not particularly flattering nor revealing of physical detail", however he thought the lightening at the finals was better than previous years. On 26 April 2005, IFBB Professional Committee adopted, by a vote of 9 for, 1 against and 3 no votes, Resolution 2005-001, which removed weight classes to allow for one category only of competition in women's professional bodybuilding and that it would take effect at the 2005 Ms. Olympia.

=== 2006 – 2013 ===
At the 2006 Ms. International, after being dethroned at the 2005 Ms. Olympia, Iris Kyle dethroned the reigning Ms. International Yaxeni Oriquen-Garcia for the second time, who fell to 3rd place. This was Iris' 2nd overall Ms. International title. This Ms. International also removed weight classes, the first Ms. International without weight classes since 1999. In a Muscle & Fitness article, written by the Flex Staff, commented that she was more mindful of the 20 percent rule and had "offered a slightly streamlined look, while maintaining her crispness and rock hard condition."

At the 2007 Ms. International, Iris won her 3rd overall Ms. International title, tying with Yaxieni's record of 3 overall Ms. International titles, although she had more heavyweight Ms. International titles (3) than Iris (1). According to Juan Lopez, Iris, Yaxeni and Heather Armbrust where all "big girls and seemed to be decimating the decree of 20% muscularity reduction." He also stated that weight classes, while might have had disadvantages to it, there was room to do well at the show if they had good conditioning. According to Steve Wennerstrom, Iris had increased her weight from 157 lb (71 kg) at the 2006 Ms. Olympia to 161 lb (73 kg) at the 2007 Ms. International. He stated that the final results showed the need to return the weight classes at all professional female bodybuilding contests. He noted that only two of the three who would qualify as lightweights (six in this field) had finished higher than 10th.

There was a bit of a controversy in the 2008 Ms. International. In the first call out, it was Yaxeni, Lisa, Iris, Dayana and Brenda. In the second call out, it was Brenda, Lisa, Dayana, Iris and Yaxeni. In the eight and final callout, it was Lisa, Iris, Dayana and Yaxeni. According to the scorecard, Iris received 44 points in rounds 1 & 2, placing her below Dayana Cadeau and Yaxeni Oriquen. In round 3, Iris received 65 points, which placed her outside round 4 judging, the third time in her career that happened. Going into round 3, Dayana led with 20 points, while Yaxeni had 25 points. In round 4, Dayana received 12 points, while Yaxeni received only 5 points. This was the first Ms. International since 1999 when Iris did not place high enough to be in the posedown. When the total was added up, Yaxeni dethroned Iris of being the Ms. International title holder and edged out runner-up Dayana Cadeau by the score of 30 to 32, the tying with 1991 Ms. International as the closest victory in Ms. International history. Yaxeni won her 4th overall Ms. International title, tying with Kenneth Wheeler's 4 overall Arnold Classic titles, although Yaxeni had 3 heavyweight Ms. International titles as well. Iris tied with Betty Viana-Adkins, who received 88 points in rounds 1 & 2, for 7th place due to bumps on her shoulders and glutes, which she later admitted were "noticeable site injections". According to head IFBB judge, Sandy Ranalli, these were "distortions in her physique". In a post-win interview with Dave Palumbo, Yaxeni said that she thought that while Iris should have been penalized for the bumps, she should have placed in the top six.

At the 2009 Ms. International, coming off her win at the 2008 Ms. Olympia, Iris dethroned the reigning Ms. International Yaxeni Oriquen-Garcia for a third time. Iris won her 4th overall Ms. International title, tying with Kenneth's 4 overall Arnold Classic titles and Yaxeni's 4 overall Ms. International titles, although Yaxeni had more heavyweight Ms. International titles (3) than Iris (1). According to Kris Gethin, she stated that the fullness of Iris' muscle bellies and sheer size, without the need of her "trademark crazy condition". She also noted that while Yaxeni had size, symmetry and condition in her front, but her back was a "little soft".

On March 4, 2010, the day before the 2010 Ms. International, Dave interviewed Iris, who stated she would be on stage this year at 163 lb (74 kg). According to Ron Harris, he stated it was not an obvious choice between her and Yaxeni. He commented that Iris dominates from the back, but Yaxeni more than holds her own in the front. Talking about the prejudging, he stated that the contestants conditioning was not easy to assess due to the flat lighting on the main stage of the expo. At the 2010 Ms. International, she won her 5th overall Ms. International title, surpassing Kenneth's 4 overall Arnold Classic titles and Yaxieni's record of 4 overall Ms. International titles. With 5 overall and 1 heavyweight Ms. International titles, this means she won more Arnold Classic and Ms. International titles than anyone. According to Ruth Silverman, she stated that the results show why smaller professional female bodybuilders might get discouraged as the top five, Iris, Yaxieni Oriquen-Garcia, Debi Laszewski, Lisa Aukland and Betty Pariso, were all "very big women". Commenting about the finals, Ron said Iris had more mass, better conditioning, and a developed back that overpowered Yaxeni. In The Wennerstrom Report, Steve stated that virtually every muscle group on Iris' physique was chiseled and as finely tuned and detailed as a "Ferrari Testarossa". He also stated that Iris won the contest before the end of the first callout. He also commented that both Yaxeni and Debi, while outstanding, fell short of Iris' level of conditioning.

At the 2011 Ms. International, Iris won, despite being sick with a cold for two months prior to the contest, which resulted in her having to cut back slightly on exercising. She solidified her record by winning her 6th overall Ms. International title. This was her 3rd consecutive overall Ms. International titles in a row, tying with Jason Cutler's record of 3 consecutive overall Arnold Classic titles in a row and Ondrea Gates' record of 3 consecutive overall Ms. International titles in a row, although Ondrea won 2 heavyweight Ms. International titles consecutively in a row during that time as well. Due to a knee injury, Iris could not compete in the 2012 Ms. International, which was won by Yaxeni Oriquen-Garcia. At the 2013 Ms. International, she was dethroned by Iris for a fourth time, who won despite having the flu and, due to not resting, got a respiratory infection. She solidified her record by winning her 7th overall Ms. International title.

On June 7, 2013, event promoter of the Arnold Sports Festival, Jim Lorimer, announced that in 2014, the Arnold Classic 212 professional men's bodybuilding division would replace the Ms. International women's bodybuilding competition at the 2014 Arnold Sports Festival. Lorimer, in a statement, said "The Arnold Sports Festival was proud to support women's bodybuilding through the Ms. International for the past quarter-century, but in keeping with demands of our fans, the time has come to introduce the Arnold Classic 212 beginning in 2014. We are excited to create a professional competitive platform for some of the IFBB Pro League's most popular competitors."

=== 2018 ===
On January 5, 2018, Beth Mandyck, a female bodybuilder, filed a sex discrimination lawsuit with the city of Columbus, Ohio over the IFBB canceling the Ms. International from the Arnold Sports Festival. She has also started a change.org petition. Her complaint has been backed by Iris Kyle, Nancy Hogshead-Makar, former Olympic gold medalist and the CEO of Champion Women, an advocacy group for women in sports, and Women's Sports Foundation.

== Champions ==
=== Chronologically ===
Year	Ms. International champions		Posedown music	Prize purse	Venue
1986	(Australia) Erika Geisen		Twist My Arm by The Pointer Sisters	$10,000+ Trophies (1st, 2nd, 3rd place)	Plush Room, Columbus (Cols.), Ohio (OH), United States of America (USA)
1988	(United States) Cathey Palyo			$50,000 + Trophies (1st, 2nd, 3rd place)	Greater Columbus Convention Center, Cols., OH, USA (prejudging); Franklin County Veterans Memorial, Cols., OH, USA (finals)
1989	(United States) ~~Tonya Knight~~ Jackie Paisley ^{1}			$60,000 + Trophies (1st, 2nd, 3rd place)	Greater Columbus Convention Center, Cols., OH, USA (prejudging); Franklin County Veterans Memorial, Cols., OH, USA (finals)
1990	(United States) Laura Creavalle		Push It by Salt-N-Pepa	$23,500 + Trophies (1st, 2nd, 3rd place)	Greater Columbus Convention Center, Cols., OH, USA (prejudging); Franklin County Veterans Memorial, Cols., OH, USA (finals)
1991	(United States) Tonya Knight			$50,000 + Trophies (1st, 2nd, 3rd place)	Greater Columbus Convention Center, Cols., OH, USA (prejudging); Franklin County Veterans Memorial, Cols., OH, USA (finals)
1992	(Germany) Anja Schreiner			$60,000 + Trophies (1st, 2nd, 3rd place)	Greater Columbus Convention Center, Cols., OH, USA (prejudging); Franklin County Veterans Memorial, Cols., OH, USA (finals)
1993	(United States) Kim Chizevsky			$40,000 + Trophies (1st, 2nd, 3rd place)	Greater Columbus Convention Center, Cols., OH, USA (prejudging); Franklin County Veterans Memorial, Cols., OH, USA (finals)
1994	(United States) Laura Creavalle			$50,000 + Trophies (1st, 2nd, 3rd place)	Greater Columbus Convention Center, Cols., OH, USA (prejudging); Franklin County Veterans Memorial, Cols., OH, USA (finals)
1995	(United States) Laura Creavalle			$75,000 + Trophies (1st, 2nd, 3rd place)	Greater Columbus Convention Center, Cols., OH, USA (prejudging); Franklin County Veterans Memorial, Cols., OH, USA (finals)
1996	(United States) Kim Chizevsky			$50,000 + Trophies (1st, 2nd, 3rd place)	Greater Columbus Convention Center, Cols., OH, USA (prejudging); Franklin County Veterans Memorial, Cols., OH, USA (finals)
1997	(United States) Yolanda Hughes		Large Outdoor Concert Crowd by Sound Ideas	$50,000 + Trophies (1st, 2nd, 3rd place)	Greater Columbus Convention Center, Cols., OH, USA (prejudging); Franklin County Veterans Memorial, Cols., OH, USA (finals)
1998	(United States) Yolanda Hughes			$60,000 + Trophies (1st, 2nd, 3rd place)	Greater Columbus Convention Center, Cols., OH, USA (prejudging); Franklin County Veterans Memorial, Cols., OH, USA (finals)
1999	(United States) Ondrea Gates		レモン by Jomen	$60,000 + Trophies (1st, 2nd, 3rd place)	Greater Columbus Convention Center, Cols., OH, USA (prejudging); Franklin County Veterans Memorial, Cols., OH, USA (finals)
2000	(United States) Ondrea Gates (Overall (OA) & heavyweight (HW))	(United States) Brenda Raganot (lightweight (LW))		$47,000 + Trophies (OA, 1st (HW & LW), 2nd (HW & LW), 3rd place (HW & LW))	Greater Columbus Convention Center, Cols., OH, USA (prejudging); Franklin County Veterans Memorial, Cols., OH, USA (finals)
2001	(United States) Ondrea Gates (Overall (OA) & heavyweight (HW))	(Canada) Dayana Cadeau (LW)	Ongaphantsi by DJ Toxic Feat. Keey Smith (LW posedown); United by FarFunky (OA posedown)	$50,000 + Trophies (OA, 1st (HW & LW), 2nd (HW & LW), 3rd place (HW & LW))	Greater Columbus Convention Center, Cols., OH, USA (prejudging); Franklin County Veterans Memorial, Cols., OH, USA (finals)
2002	(Venezuela) Yaxeni Oriquen (OA & HW)	(Ukraine) Valentina Chepiga (LW)	A Series Of Moments by 8 Degrees	$60,000 + Trophies (OA, 1st (HW & LW), 2nd (HW & LW), 3rd place (HW & LW))	Greater Columbus Convention Center, Cols., OH, USA (prejudging); Franklin County Veterans Memorial, Cols., OH, USA (finals)
2003	(Venezuela) Yaxeni Oriquen (OA & HW)	(Canada) Catherine LeFrançois (LW)		$60,000 + Trophies (OA, 1st (HW & LW), 2nd (HW & LW), 3rd place (HW & LW))	Greater Columbus Convention Center, Cols., OH, USA (prejudging); Franklin County Veterans Memorial, Cols., OH, USA (finals)
2004	(United States) Iris Kyle (OA & HW)	(Canada) Dayana Cadeau (LW)	Family System by Chevelle (LW and HW posedowns); Open Your Eyes (Amended) by Staind (OA posedown)	$50,000 + $20,000 T3 watch + Trophies (1st, 2nd, 3rd place) + Trophies (OA, 1st (HW & LW), 2nd (HW & LW), 3rd place (HW & LW))	Greater Columbus Convention Center, Cols., OH, USA (prejudging); Franklin County Veterans Memorial, Cols., OH, USA (finals)
2005	(Venezuela) Yaxeni Oriquen (OA & HW)	(United States) Brenda Raganot (LW)		$60,000 + Trophies (OA, 1st (HW & LW), 2nd (HW & LW), 3rd place (HW & LW))	Greater Columbus Convention Center, Cols., OH, USA (prejudging); Franklin County Veterans Memorial, Cols., OH, USA (finals)
2006	(United States) Iris Kyle		A Series Of Moments by 8 Degrees	$60,000 + Trophies (OA, 1st (HW & LW), 2nd (HW & LW), 3rd place (HW & LW))	Greater Columbus Convention Center, Cols., OH, USA (prejudging); Franklin County Veterans Memorial, Cols., OH, USA (finals)
2007	(United States) Iris Kyle		Superbeast by Rob Zombie	$55,500 + Trophies (1st, 2nd, 3rd place) + Arnold Classic Championship Ring	Greater Columbus Convention Center, Cols., OH, USA (prejudging); Franklin County Veterans Memorial, Cols., OH, USA (finals)
2008	(Venezuela) Yaxeni Oriquen-Garcia		Superbeast by Rob Zombie	$56,000 + Trophies (1st, 2nd, 3rd place) + Arnold Classic Championship Ring	Greater Columbus Convention Center, Cols., OH, USA (prejudging); Franklin County Veterans Memorial, Cols., OH, USA (finals)
2009	(United States) Iris Kyle		Good Friends And A Bottle Of Pills by Pantera	$56,000 + Trophies (1st, 2nd, 3rd place) + Arnold Classic Championship Ring	Greater Columbus Convention Center, Cols., OH, USA (prejudging); Franklin County Veterans Memorial, Cols., OH, USA (finals)
2010	(United States) Iris Kyle		Thorn In My Side by Exodus	$56,000 + Trophies (1st, 2nd, 3rd place) + Arnold Classic Championship Ring	Greater Columbus Convention Center, Cols., OH, USA (prejudging); Franklin County Veterans Memorial, Cols., OH, USA (finals)
2011	(United States) Iris Kyle		Thorn In My Side by Exodus	$56,000 + Trophies (1st, 2nd, 3rd place) + Arnold Classic Championship Ring	Greater Columbus Convention Center, Cols., OH, USA (prejudging); Franklin County Veterans Memorial, Cols., OH, USA (finals)
2012	(United States) Yaxeni Oriquen-Garcia		Let Me Hear You Scream by Ozzy Osbourne	$56,000 + Trophies (1st, 2nd, 3rd place) + Tony Nowak jacket + Arnold Classic Championship Ring	Greater Columbus Convention Center, Cols., OH, USA (prejudging); Franklin County Veterans Memorial, Cols., OH, USA (finals)
2013	(United States) Iris Kyle		100,000 Strong (Instrumental) by Hirax	$56,000 + Trophies (1st, 2nd, 3rd place) + Trophies (1st, 2nd, 3rd place) + Arnold Classic Championship Ring	Greater Columbus Convention Center, Cols., OH, USA (prejudging); Franklin County Veterans Memorial, Cols., OH, USA (finals)

Notes:

- ^{1} Tonya Knight had to forfeit both her placing and prize money when it was found out she had used someone else to take her drug test at the 1988 Ms. Olympia.

=== Number of wins ===
Ranking	Champions	Years	Number of wins		
Ranking	Champions	Years	Overall	Heavyweight	Lightweight
1st	(United States) Iris Kyle	2004, 2006 – 2007, 2009 – 2011 & 2013	7	1	0
2nd	(Venezuela) (United States) Yaxeni Oriquen-Garcia	2002 – 2003, 2005, 2008 & 2012	5	3	0
3rd	(United States) Ondrea Gates	1999 – 2001	3	2	0
4th	(United States) Laura Creavalle	1990 & 1994 – 1995	3	0	0
5th	(United States) Kim Chizevsky	1993 & 1996	2	0	0
5th	(United States) Yolanda Hughes	1997 – 1998	2	0	0
6th	(Australia) Erika Geisen	1986	1	0	0
6th	(United States) Cathey Palyo	1988	1	0	0
6th	(United States) Jackie Paisley	1989	1	0	0
6th	(United States) Tonya Knight	~~1989~~ 1991 ^{1}	1	0	0
6th	(Germany) Anja Schreiner	1992	1	0	0
7th	(United States) Brenda Raganot	2000 & 2005	0	0	2
7th	(Canada) Dayana Cadeau	2001 & 2004	0	0	2
8th	(Ukraine) Valentina Chepiga	2002	0	0	1
8th	(Canada) Catherine LeFrançois	2003	0	0	1

Notes:

- ^{1} Tonya Knight had to forfeit both her placing and prize money when it was found out she had used someone else to take her drug test at the 1988 Ms. Olympia.

=== Number of consecutive wins ===
Ranking	Champion	Years	Number of consecutive wins	
Ranking	Champion	Years	Overall	Heavyweight
1st	(United States) Ondrea Gates	1999 – 2001	3	2
2nd	(United States) Iris Kyle	2009 – 2011	3	0
3rd	(Venezuela) (United States) Yaxeni Oriquen-Garcia	2002 – 2003	2	2
4th	(United States) Laura Creavalle	1994 – 1995	2	0
4th	(United States) Yolanda Hughes	1997 – 1998	2	0
4th	(United States) Iris Kyle	2006 – 2007	2	0

=== Top three ===
Year	Ms. International champions	Runner−up	3rd place
1986	(Australia) Erika Geisen	(Netherlands) Juliette Bergmann	(Australia) Beverley Francis
1988	(United States) Cathey Palyo	(United States) Tami Imbriale	(United States) Jackie Paisley
1989	(United States) ~~Tonya Knight~~ Jackie Paisley ^{1}	(United States) Laura Beaudry	(United States) Joanne McCartney
1990	(United States) Laura Creavalle	(United States) Jackie Paisley	(West Germany) Anja Schreiner
1991	(United States) Tonya Knight	(Germany) Anja Schreiner	(United States) Shelley Beattie
1992	(Germany) Anja Schreiner	(United States) Debbie Muggli	(United States) Laura Creavalle
1993	(United States) Kim Chizevsky	(United States) Debbie Muggli	(United States) Sandy Riddell
1994	(United States) Laura Creavalle	(United States) Debbie Muggli	(United States) Yolanda Hughes
1995	(United States) Laura Creavalle	(United States) Kim Chizevsky	(United States) Debbie Muggli
1996	(United States) Kim Chizevsky	(United States) Laura Creavalle	(United States) Ondrea Gates
1997	(United States) Yolanda Hughes	(United States) Ondrea Gates	(United States) Tazzie Colomb
1998	(United States) Yolanda Hughes	(United States) ~~Lesa Lewis~~ Susan Myers ^{2}	(United States) ~~Gayle Moher~~ Ondrea Gates ^{2}
1999	(United States) Ondrea Gates	(United States) Lesa Lewis	(United States) Yolanda Hughes
2000	(United States) Ondrea Gates (Overall (OA) & Heavyweight (HW)) (United States) Brenda Raganot (Lightweight (LW))	(United States) Denise Hoshor (HW) (United Kingdom) Andrulla Blanchette (LW)	(United States) ~~Iris Kyle~~ Amy Pazzo (HW) ^{2} (Canada) Catherine LeFrançois (LW)
2001	(United States) Ondrea Gates ((OA) & (HW)) (Canada) Dayana Cadeau (LW)	(United States) Iris Kyle (HW) (United States) Brenda Raganot (LW)	(United States) Lesa Lewis (HW) (Brazil) Angela Debatin (LW)
2002	(Venezuela) Yaxeni Oriquen ((OA) & (HW)) (Ukraine) Valentina Chepiga (LW)	(United States) Iris Kyle (HW) (Canada) Dayana Cadeau (LW)	(United States) Ondrea Gates (HW) (Venezuela) Fannie Barrios (LW)
2003	(Venezuela) Yaxeni Oriquen ((OA) & (HW)) (Canada) Catherine Priest (LW)	(United States) Betty Pariso (HW) (United States) Denise Masino (LW)	(United States) Brenda Raganot (HW) (Brazil) Karina Nascimento (LW)
2004	(United States) Iris Kyle ((OA) & (HW)) (Canada) Dayana Cadeau (LW)	(Venezuela) Yaxeni Oriquen (HW) (Canada) Sophie Duquette (LW)	(United States) Betty Pariso (HW) (United States) Denise Masino (LW)
2005	(Venezuela) Yaxeni Oriquen ((OA) & (HW)) (United States) Brenda Raganot (LW)	(Venezuela) Betty Viana (HW) (United States) Mah-Ann Mendoza (LW)	(United States) Betty Pariso (HW) (Canada) Desiree Ellis (LW)
2006	(United States) Iris Kyle	(Canada) Dayana Cadeau	(Venezuela) Yaxeni Oriquen-Garcia
2007	(United States) Iris Kyle	(Venezuela) Yaxeni Oriquen-Garcia	(United States) Heather Armbrust
2008	(Venezuela) Yaxeni Oriquen-Garcia	(Canada) Dayana Cadeau	(United States) Lisa Aukland
2009	(United States) Iris Kyle	(United States) Debi Laszewski	(Venezuela) Yaxeni Oriquen-Garcia
2010	(United States) Iris Kyle	(Venezuela) Yaxeni Oriquen-Garcia	(United States) Debi Laszewski
2011	(United States) Iris Kyle	(Venezuela) Yaxeni Oriquen-Garcia	(Switzerland) Alina Popa
2012	(United States) Yaxeni Oriquen-Garcia	(United States) Debi Laszewski	(Romania) Alina Popa
2013	(United States) Iris Kyle	(United States) Yaxeni Oriquen-Garcia	(United States) Debi Laszewski

Notes:

- ^{1} Tonya Knight had to forfeit both her placing and prize money when it was found out she had used someone else to take her drug test at the 1988 Ms. Olympia.
- ^{2} Lesa Lewis, Gayle Moher and Iris Kyle were later disqualified for testing positive for diuretic use.

=== Medals by nation ===
Rank	Nation	Gold	Silver	Bronze	Total
1	United States (USA)	26	21	22	69
2	Venezuela (VEN)	7	4	3	14
3	Canada (CAN)	3	4	2	9
4	Germany (DEU)	1	1	0	2
5	Australia (AUS)	1	0	1	2
6	Ukraine (UKR)	1	0	0	1
7	Great Britain (GBR)	0	1	0	1
7	Netherlands (NED)	0	1	0	1
9	Romania (ROU)	0	0	1	1
9	Switzerland (CHE)	0	0	1	1
9	West Germany (BRD)	0	0	1	1
Totals (11 entries)		39	32	31	102

=== Other records ===
- Closest Ms. International scores - 1991 and 2008 Ms. International's (overall) with a margin of 2 / 2001 Ms. International (lightweight and heavyweight) with a margin of 2 for the lightweight title and 16 for the heavyweight title
- Heaviest Ms. International - Yaxeni Oriquen-Garcia (174.5 lb (79.2 kg))
- Ms. International with highest number of perfect win scores - Iris Kyle with 5 overalls and 1 heavyweight
- Ms. International with largest biceps - Yaxeni Oriquen-Garcia (17 + inches (43 + cm))
- Oldest Ms. International overall (OA) - Yaxeni Oriquen-Garcia (45 years old; 2012 Ms. International)
  - Oldest Ms. International lightweight (LW) - Valentina Chepiga (39 years old; 2002 Ms. International)
  - Oldest Ms. International heavyweight (HW) - Yaxeni Oriquen-Garcia (38 years old; 2005 Ms. International)
- Smallest Ms. International - Catherine Priest (5 ft 3 in (1.60 m))
- Tallest Ms. International - Kim Chizevsky (5 ft 8 in (1.73 m))
- Youngest Ms. International OA - Kim Chizevsky (24 years, 10 months and 11 days old; 1993 Ms. International)
  - Youngest Ms. International HW - Iris Kyle (29 years old; 2004 Ms. International)
  - Youngest Ms. International LW - Catherine Priest (32 years old; 2003 Ms. International)

== See also ==
- Rising Phoenix World Championships (the equivalent contest to the Ms. International from 2020 – present)
- Arnold Classic (the male equivalent)
- Arnold Sports Festival
