= Gayle Moher =

British-American professional bodybuilder (born 1957)

- Professional bodybuilder

Personal info
- Born: April 7, 1957 (age 69); Hillingdon, London, England, U.K.

Best statistics
- Height: 5 ft 4 in (1.63 m)
- Weight: In Season: 128–140 lb (58–64 kg); Off-Season: 140–150 lb (64–68 kg)

Professional (Pro) career
- Pro-debut: IFBB Ms. International; 1997
- Best win: IFBB Jan Tana Classic champion; 1999
- Predecessor: Lesa Lewis
- Successor: Nancy Lewis
- Active: Since 1995

Gayle Moher (born April 7, 1957) is a British-American professional bodybuilder.

== Biography ==
As a teenager, she competed in several beauty pageants. She took up bodybuilding in 1990 after visiting the United States of America. Moher earned her pro card by winning the NPC Nationals in 1996, and competed in her first professional contest the following year. Around this time, she began training other women from a gym in her basement. In February 2000, Moher opened her own combination gym and spa, Gayle Moher's Face and Bodyworks. Her greatest success as a professional to date was winning the 1999 Jan Tana Classic.

== Personal life ==
She stands 5 ft 4 in (1.63 m) and weighs approximately 130 lb (59 kg) in contest shape. Moher has a daughter named Courtney and currently lives in Scottsdale, Arizona. Her life was featured in the episode Muscle Worship of the 2007 Five documentary series Hidden Lives.

== Contest history ==
- 1995 NPC Nationals - 17th (MW)
- 1996 NPC Jr. Nationals - 2nd (MW)
- 1996 NPC Nationals - 1st (MW & overall)
- 1997 Ms. International - 5th
- 1997 Jan Tana Classic - 4th
- 1997 IFBB Ms. Olympia - 12th
- 1998 Ms. International - Disqualified
- 1998 Jan Tana Classic - 2nd
- 1998 IFBB Ms. Olympia - 11th
- 1999 Ms. International - 6th
- 1999 Pro World Championship - 3rd
- 1999 Jan Tana Classic - 1st
- 1999 IFBB Ms. Olympia - 11th
- 2000 Ms. International - 5th (LW)
- 2000 Jan Tana Classic - 2nd (MW)
- 2001 Ms. International - 6th (HW)
- 2001 IFBB Ms. Olympia - 5th (LW)
- 2002 Ms. International - 4th (HW)
- 2002 Jan Tana Classic - 3rd (MW)
- 2002 GNC Show of Strength - 7th (LW)
- 2002 Southwest USA Pro Cup - 2nd (HW)
- 2003 Ms. International - 6th (HW)
- 2004 GNC Show of Strength - 4th (LW)
- 2004 Night of Champions - 4th (LW)
- 2005 New York Pro - 4th (LW)
- 2005 Charlotte Pro - Withdrew (LW)
- 2006 Atlantic City Pro - 4th
- 2006 IFBB Ms. Olympia - 9th
- 2007 Sacramento Pro - 4th (LW)
- 2009 Atlantic City Pro - 7th
- 2010 Phoenix Pro - 9th
