= Laura Creavalle =

Guyanese-born Canadian/American professional female bodybuilder

- Professional bodybuilder

Personal info
- Born: January 25, 1959 (age 67); British Guiana

Best statistics
- Height: 5 ft 4 in (1.63 m)

Professional (Pro) career
- Pro-debut: IFBB Ms. Olympia; 1988
- Best win: IFBB Ms. International champion; 1990, 1994, and 1995
- Predecessor: Jackie Paisley; Kim Chizevsky-Nicholls
- Successor: Tonya Knight; Kim Chizevsky-Nicholls
- Active: Retired 2002

Laura Cordelia Creavalle is a Guyanese-born Canadian/American professional female bodybuilder.

== Early life and education ==
Laura Creavalle was born in 1959 in British Guiana. She migrated to Canada at the age of 13. She attended both Industrial High School and Mercy College.

== Bodybuilding career ==
=== Amateur ===
During a 1982 trip to Kingston, Jamaica, Creavalle happened upon a women’s bodybuilding contest and was impressed that the competitor who placed third had a body type similar to hers – a lower body proportionally larger than the upper body. Upon returning to her home in Toronto, Ontario, she began training to become a bodybuilder. Six months later, she entered her first contest, the Novice Ontario Championships, and won the lightweight title. In 1983, she and training partner Tony Melville joined poses and took second place at the Canadian Couples Championships. A trip to California further stimulated her interest, which resulted in her relocating. In 1986, she won the NPC USA Championships. She earned her pro card by winning the heavyweight class at the 1988 IFBB World Amateur Championships in Puerto Rico.

=== Professional ===
In 1988, Creavalle made her pro debut six weeks later at the 1988 Ms. Olympia contest, a contest to which she would return 12 more times before her retirement. During her pro career, her home country would appear as both Canada and the United States in the competition scorecard. She was runner-up twice at the Ms. Olympia (1992, 1994) and won three Ms. International titles (1990, 1994–95).

=== Retirement ===
After coming in 6th at the 2002 Ms. Olympia, Creavalle retired from bodybuilding.

=== Legacy ===
Creavalle was inducted into the IFBB Hall of Fame in 2007. Currently, she is the most successful bodybuilder of Guyanese descent in the world.

=== Contest history ===
- 1983 Novice Canada - 1st
- 1983 Toronto Championships - 1st
- 1983 Ontario Canadian Championships novice - 1st
- 1985 Toronto Championships - 1st
- 1985 The Choice of Champions - 1st
- 1986 NPC Southern California - 1st (HW)
- 1986 NPC California State - 2nd (HW)
- 1986 NPC Nationals - 4th (MW)
- 1986 NPC USA Championship - 1st (LHW and overall)
- 1986 NPC USA Mixed Pairs - 1st
- 1988 IFBB Caribbean Championships - 1st (HW)
- 1988 IFBB World Amateur Championships - 1st (HW)
- 1988 IFBB Ms. Olympia - 11th
- 1989 Pro World - 8th
- 1989 IFBB Ms. Olympia - 6th
- 1990 Ms. International - 1st
- 1990 IFBB Ms. Olympia - 4th
- 1991 IFBB Ms. Olympia - 3rd
- 1992 Ms. International - 3rd
- 1992 IFBB Ms. Olympia - 2nd
- 1993 IFBB Ms. Olympia - 3rd
- 1994 Ms. International - 1st
- 1994 IFBB Ms. Olympia - 2nd
- 1995 Ms. International - 1st
- 1995 IFBB Ms. Olympia - 5th
- 1996 Ms. International - 2nd
- 1996 IFBB Ms. Olympia - 4th
- 1997 IFBB Ms. Olympia - 4th
- 1998 IFBB Ms. Olympia - 5th
- 1999 Pro Extravaganza - 1st
- 1999 IFBB Ms. Olympia - 3rd
- 2002 IFBB Ms. Olympia - 6th (LW)

== Personal life ==
Now retired from competition, she operates Club Creavalle Training Camp, offering personal training, nutrition training, and related services. She also has written two cook books, A Taste of Club Creavalle and The Lite Lifestyle: 150 Ultra Low Calorie Recipes for Rapid Weight Loss!. She also co-authored The Health Handbook with former husband Chris Aceto. Laura has been a feature editor for Muscle & Fitness magazine on low fat cooking in the Muscle Fare column.

She has remarried since December 2000 to Colin Maragh, who both now currently live in Toronto, Ontario, Canada, sells healthy meals through their company, Healthy Gourmet Express, which provides customers with weekly deliveries of 10 meals.

Ms. International
Preceded by: Jackie Paisley	First (1990)	Succeeded by: Tonya Knight
Preceded by: Kim Chizevsky-Nicholls	Second (1994)	Succeeded by: Herself
Preceded by: Herself	Third (1995)	Succeeded by: Kim Chizevsky-Nicholls
