= Dayana Cadeau =

American bodybuilding champion (born 1966)

- Professional bodybuilder
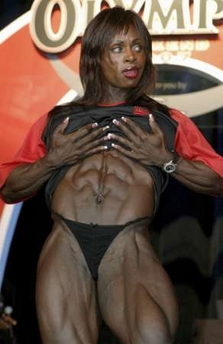
- Cadeau posing against Iris Kyle on September 27, 2007 at the 2007 Olympia Press Conference.

Personal info
- Nickname: The Gift
- Born: June 2, 1966 (age 60); Haiti

Best statistics
- Height: 5 ft 4.5 in (1.64 m)
- Weight: (In Season): 123–160 lb (56–73 kg) (Off-Season): 140–155 lb (64–70 kg)

Professional (Pro) career
- Pro-debut: IFBB Jan Tana Classic; 1997
- Best win: IFBB Ms. Olympia lightweight champion; 2004
- Predecessor: Juliette Bergmann
- Successor: None
- Active: Retired 2011 (bodybuilding)

Dayana M. Cadeau (born June 2, 1966) is a Haitian Canadian professional female bodybuilder.

== Early life and education ==
Cadeau was born in 1966 in Haiti. At the age of seven, she and her mom moved to Quebec City, Quebec, where she was raised. Her mom wanted her to learn English, so she was enrolled in a private Christian school.

== Bodybuilding career ==
=== Amateur ===
Cadeau earned her pro card in 1997 by winning the overall title at the Canada Cup.

=== Professional ===
==== 1997-2004 ====
When the IFBB introduced weight classes in 2000, Cadeau first competed as a heavyweight at the 2000 Ms. International. Afterwards she competed as a lightweight. During her pro career, her home country would appear as both Canada and the United States in the competition scorecard. At the 2002 Ms. International, she again competed as a heavyweight. In the 2003 Ms. International, she competed as a lightweight, only to compete as a middleweight in the 2003 Jan Tana Classic. The year 2004 was her most successful year in the sport, with her winning the lightweight title in the Ms. International and Ms. Olympia.

==== 2005-2011 ====
She would place 2nd at Ms. Olympia from 2006 to 2008. She would remain in the top six in every IFBB pro-competition, with the exception of the 2009 Ms. International and 2011 Ms. International and 2011 Ms. Olympia.

=== Retirement ===
In 2011, Cadeau announced she is retiring from bodybuilding and joined physique.

=== Legacy ===
Currently, Cadeau is the most successful Canadian bodybuilder in the world, by being the only Canadian to win the Ms. Olympia lightweight. She is also the most successful bodybuilder of Haitian descent. She has never won an overall pro title, but she has four class titles to her credit—lightweight at the Ms. International in 2001 and 2004, middleweight at the 2003 Jan Tana Classic, and lightweight at the Ms. Olympia in 2004. From October 2009 to August 2013, she helped create and promote the NPC Dayana Cadeau Classic.

=== Competition history ===
- 1992 Quebec Metropolitan - 1st Overall
- 1993 IFBB Quebec Provincial - 1st (HW and overall)
- 1994 CBBF Canadian Championship - 3rd (HW)
- 1995 IFBB Canada Cup - 4th (HW)
- 1996 CBBF Canadian Championship - 2nd (HW)
- 1996 IFBB North American - 2nd (HW)
- 1997 IFBB Canada Cup - 1st (HW and overall)
- 1997 IFBB Jan Tana Classic - 11th
- 1998 IFBB Jan Tana Classic - 3rd
- 1998 IFBB Ms. Olympia - 14th
- 1999 IFBB Ms. International - 11th
- 1999 IFBB Jan Tana Classic - 9th
- 1999 IFBB Pro Extravaganza - 9th
- 2000 IFBB Ms. International - 7th (HW)
- 2000 IFBB Jan Tana Classic - 3rd (LW)
- 2001 IFBB Ms. International - 1st (LW)
- 2001 IFBB Ms. Olympia - 3rd (LW)
- 2002 IFBB Ms. International - 2nd (LW)
- 2002 IFBB Ms. Olympia - 5th (HW)
- 2003 IFBB Ms. International - 4th (LW)
- 2003 IFBB Jan Tana Classic - 1st (MW)
- 2003 IFBB Ms. Olympia - 2nd (LW)
- 2004 IFBB Ms. International - 1st (LW)
- 2004 IFBB Ms. Olympia - 1st (LW)
- 2005 IFBB Ms. Olympia - 3rd
- 2006 IFBB Ms. International - 2nd
- 2006 IFBB Ms. Olympia - 2nd
- 2007 IFBB Ms. International - 6th
- 2007 IFBB Ms. Olympia - 2nd
- 2008 IFBB Ms. International - 2nd
- 2008 IFBB Ms. Olympia - 2nd
- 2009 IFBB Ms. International - 5th
- 2009 IFBB Ms. Olympia - 8th
- 2010 IFBB Ms. International - 6th
- 2010 IFBB Ms. Olympia - 5th
- 2011 IFBB Ms. International - 9th
- 2011 IFBB Ms. Olympia - 16th

=== Best statistics ===
- Bench press - 352 lb (160 kg) for a rep
- Bust/waist/hip measurements - 35 in (89 cm), 24 in (61 cm) and 35 in (89 cm)
- Chest - 36 in (91 cm)
- Height - 5 ft 5 in (165 cm)
- On season weight - 123–160 lb (56–73 kg)

== Physique career ==
=== Competition history ===
- 2012 IFBB New York Pro - 16th
- 2012 IFBB Tampa Pro - 15th

== Personal life ==
Cadeau currently lives in Wilton Manors, Florida. She is a Christian. She speaks Haitian Creole, French, and English. Besides being a professional bodybuilder and physique contestant, she works as a legal assistant, promoter, NPC judge, adult model, and personal trainer. In January 2008, she founded the Dayana M. Cadeau Inc.

Ms. Olympia
Preceded by: Juliette Bergmann	First (2004)	Succeeded by: None

Ms. International
Preceded by: Brenda Raganot	First (2001)	Succeeded by: Valentina Chepiga
Preceded by: Cathy LeFrançois	Second (2004)	Succeeded by: Brenda Raganot
