= Ondrea Gates =

American bodybuilder (born 1962)

- Professional bodybuilder

Personal info
- Nickname: Vickie
- Born: September 25, 1962 (age 63); San Antonio, Texas, U.S.

Best statistics
- Height: 5 ft 4 in (1.63 m)
- Weight: On-season: 140–160 lb (64–73 kg); Off-season: 150–155 lb (68–70 kg)

Professional (Pro) career
- Pro-debut: IFBB Grand Prix Prague; 1994
- Best win: IFBB Ms. International champion; 1999, 2000, 2001
- Predecessor: Yolanda Hughes
- Successor: Yaxeni Oriquen-Garcia
- Active: Retired 2003

Ondrea "Vickie" Victoria Gates (previously Ondrea Victoria Gates-Lewis born September 25, 1962) is a professional female bodybuilder from the United States.

== Early life and education ==
Gates was born on September 9, 1962, in San Antonio, Texas, and raised in Lawton, Oklahoma, one of six children (four sisters, one brother). She was the middle child. In 1980, she graduated from Eisenhower High School. From 1982-1984, she attended Oklahoma State University.

== Bodybuilding career ==
=== Amateur ===
Gates competed in athletics and started lifting weights in college. In 1983, she competed in her first competition in Tulsa, Oklahoma, which she won. She worked her way up through the amateur ranks, eventually earning her pro card in 1993 by winning the middleweight class at the NPC Nationals.

=== Professional ===
Gates's long string of high placings as a professional includes three consecutive Ms. International titles from 1999 to 2001. Those same years, she would also finish second at the Ms. Olympia on three occasions.

=== Retirement ===
In 2003, Gates retired from bodybuilder after coming in 7th at the 2003 Ms. Olympia.

=== Legacy ===
In 2010, Gates was inducted into the 2010 IFBB Hall of Fame.

=== Contest history ===
- 1984 Tulsa Classic - 1st
- 1986 USA Championships - 4th (HW)
- 1989 NPC Junior USA Championships - 3rd (MW)
- 1989 IFBB North American Championship – 2nd (MW)
- 1990 NPC USA Championships – 10th (MW)
- 1991 NPC Junior USA Championships - 3rd (HW)
- 1991 IFBB North American Championship – 9th (HW)
- 1992 NPC Nationals – 3rd (MW)
- 1993 NPC USA Championships – 1st (MW)
- 1993 NPC Nationals – 1st (MW)
- 1994 IFBB Grand Prix Prague - 5th
- 1994 Jan Tana Classic - 4th
- 1995 Ms. International - 11th
- 1995 Jan Tana Classic - 8th
- 1996 Ms. International - 3rd
- 1996 IFBB Ms. Olympia - 5th
- 1996 Grand Prix Slovakia - 4th
- 1996 Grand Prix Prague - 4th
- 1997 Ms. International - 2nd
- 1997 IFBB Ms. Olympia - 5th
- 1998 Ms. International - 3rd
- 1998 IFBB Ms. Olympia - 3rd
- 1999 Ms. International - 1st
- 1999 IFBB Ms. Olympia - 2nd
- 2000 Ms. International - 1st (HW and overall)
- 2000 IFBB Ms. Olympia - 2nd (HW)
- 2001 Ms. International - 1st (HW and overall)
- 2001 IFBB Ms. Olympia - 2nd (HW)
- 2002 Ms. International - 3rd (HW)
- 2002 IFBB Ms. Olympia - 3rd (HW)
- 2003 Ms. International - 4th (HW)
- 2003 IFBB Ms. Olympia - 7th (HW)

== Personal life ==
She is a Christian. Her hobbies include reading the bible and shopping. She currently lives in Arlington, Texas, with her daughter Kindra. Since September 1999, she owns a gym called Strictly Fitness in Irving, Texas. She is a personal trainer. She also used to work for Bally Total Fitness. She has been previously married, and at that time she used the last name Gates-Lewis. In 1992, she would meet her then boyfriend, Ronnie Coleman, an IFBB pro bodybuilder who went on to become an 8-time Mr. Olympia, at a GNC store. She dated Ronnie Coleman for nearly seven years. She is currently single.

Ms. International
Preceded by: Yolanda Hughes	First (1999)	Succeeded by: Herself
Preceded by: Herself	Second (2000)	Succeeded by: Herself
Preceded by: Herself	Third (2001)	Succeeded by: Yaxeni Oriquen
