= Valentina Chepiga =

Ukrainian bodybuilder

- professional bodybuilder

Personal info
- Born: April 27, 1962 (age 63); Kharkiv, Ukrainian Soviet Socialist Republic

Best statistics
- Height: 5 ft 5 in (1.65 m)
- Weight: (In Season): 126–128 lb (57–58 kg) (Off-Season): 135–143 lb (61–65 kg)

Professional (Pro) career
- Pro-debut: IFBB Ms. Olympia; 1998
- Best win: IFBB Ms. Olympia Champion (heavyweight); 2000
- Predecessor: None
- Successor: Iris Kyle
- Active: Since 1993

Valentina Chepiga, more precisely Valentyna Chepiha (Ukrainian: Валентина Чепіга; born April 27, 1962) is a professional female bodybuilder.

== Background ==
Valentina graduated from the Kharkiv National University of Construction and Architecture with a degree in Gas Heating, Ventilation and Air-Conditioning. Between 1979 and 1992 she worked first as a technician, and then was promoted to engineer.

== Bodybuilding career ==
=== Amateur ===
Valentina began bodybuilding in 1988, and in 1992 she changed careers and became a personal trainer. Valentina won the European and World Amateur title in 1997 and won her IFBB pro card.

=== Professional ===
She then made her professional debut at the 1998 Ms. Olympia contest, finishing in 12th place. Her greatest success as a professional has been winning the heavyweight class at the 2000 Ms. Olympia the first time that class was introduced to the Ms. Olympia. No overall winner was named for that show, so she was essentially co-Ms. Olympia with lightweight class winner Andrulla Blanchette. In 2002, she took part in Ms. International, where she won the lightweight class. After a three-year break from competition, Chepiga returned to the stage at the 2007 Ms. Olympia, placing eleventh.

=== Legacy ===
Currently, she is the most successful Ukrainian bodybuilder in the world, by being the only Ukrainian to win the Ms. Olympia. From October 22, 2000 to October 26, 2001 she ranked 1st on the IFBB Women's Bodybuilding Professional Ranking List.

=== Contest history ===
- 1993 European Championships - 3rd (MW)
- 1994 European Championships - 2nd (MW)
- 1994 World Amateur Championships - 7th (MW)
- 1995 World Amateur Championships - 7th (MW)
- 1997 European Championships - 1st (MW)
- 1997 World Amateur Championships - 1st (MW and overall)
- 1998 IFBB Ms. Olympia - 12th
- 1999 Jan Tana Classic - 3rd
- 1999 IFBB Ms. Olympia - 12th
- 2000 Jan Tana Classic - 1st (MW)
- 2000 IFBB Ms. Olympia - 1st (HW)
- 2001 IFBB Ms. Olympia - 4th (HW)
- 2002 Ms. International - 1st (LW)
- 2002 IFBB Ms. Olympia - 2nd (LW)
- 2002 GNC Show of Strength - 1st (LW)
- 2003 Ms. International - 5th (LW)
- 2004 IFBB Ms. Olympia - 8th (LW)
- 2007 IFBB Ms. Olympia - 11th

== Personal life ==
She moved to Kyiv, Ukraine in 1993, and then to the United States in 1999, settling in Seattle, Washington. Valentina now lives in Anchorage, Alaska.

Ms. Olympia
New title	Heavyweight Champion; 2000	Succeeded by Iris Kyle

Ms. International
Preceded by: Dayana Cadeau	First (2002)	Succeeded by: Cathy LeFrançois
