= National Physique Committee =

Organization of competitive amateur bodybuilders in the United States

- Sport: Amateur bodybuilding
- Category: Sports governing body
- Jurisdiction: International
- Abbreviation: NPC
- Founded: 1982
- Affiliation: IFBB Professional League IFBB Amateur International / International Federation of BodyBuilding and Fitness (formerly)
- Affiliation date: Since 2005 (IFBB Professional League) Until September 18, 2017 (IFBB Amateur International / International Federation of BodyBuilding and Fitness)
- Headquarters: PO Box 789, Carnegie, Pennsylvania 15106, United States
- President: Jim Manion

Official website
- npcnewsonline.com

The National Physique Committee (NPC) is the largest amateur bodybuilding organization in the United States. Amateur bodybuilders compete in competitions from local to national competitions sanctioned by the NPC. While the term "bodybuilding" is commonly used to refer to athletes participating in contests sanctioned by the NPC and IFBB Pro League, ten divisions are represented including men's bodybuilding, women's bodybuilding, bikini, men's physique, classic physique, women's physique, figure, fitness, wellness and Fit Model.

== History ==
The Amateur Athletic Union is an organization that governs many amateur level sports in the U.S.. Each sport has a committee that provides direct oversight of that sport. For the sport of bodybuilding Jim Manion was the president of the Physique Committee. Manion decided that in order to better promote the sport of bodybuilding, he would need to break away from the AAU, so he founded the National Physique Committee in the early 1980s.

== Professional status ==
The NPC is the only amateur organization recognized by the IFBB Professional League. The IFBB Pro League is the professional league for bodybuilding athletes and the sanctioning body for the world's largest professional contests such as the Mr. Olympia, Arnold Sports Festival, and Legion Sports Fest. In order to become an IFBB professional athlete an athlete must compete at an IFBB Pro Qualifier such as the NPC Nationals Championship, NPC USA Championship, or any other pro qualifier. Professional status will be awarded to top placing athletes.

== Rules ==
Athletes must possess a valid NPC card to compete in an NPC show. NPC cards are valid for a calendar year.

=== Eligibility ===
An athlete must be a U.S. citizen to compete in the following national competitions:

- Masters National Championships
- USA Championships
- Team Universe Championships
- Nationals Championships

Proof of citizenship must be one of the following:

- A birth certificate
- A voter’s registration card
- Military discharge papers
- Naturalization Papers – Form N560
- Consular Service Form FS24 for those born outside of the United States to US parents

Residency is four (4) months prior to a contest or must be a full-time student in the area.

=== Backstage ===
- The only people permitted in the backstage area are competitors, expediters and NPC officials.
- Coaches or others may be permitted after paying for a backstage pass, along with tickets to the show.

=== Competitors' Health ===
- Any competitor who appears to be disoriented, light-headed or experiences undue cramping will not be permitted to compete.
- Any competitor disqualified for health reasons must be checked by the attending EMT and, if it is advised by the EMT, must go to the nearest hospital for evaluation.
- Competitors who refuse to be evaluated by the EMT or at the hospital will be suspended from competition for a period of one year from the date of the occurrence.

== Events ==
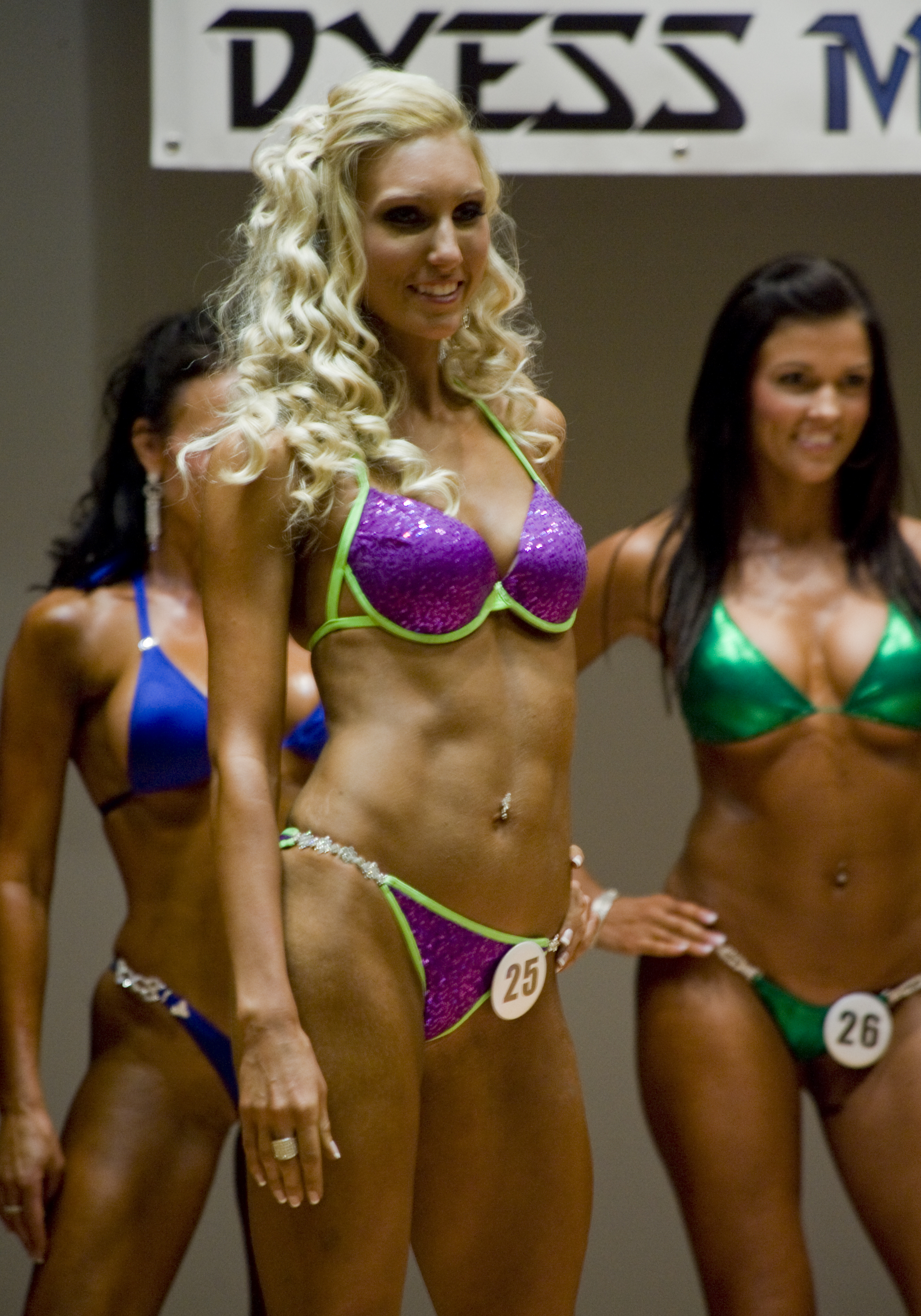
Competitors pose during the open women’s bikini division at Dyess Air Force Base in Texas in 2012.

- Men's Bodybuilding
- Classic Physique
- Men's Physique
- Fitness
- Women's Bodybuilding
- Women's Physique
- Bikini
- Figure
- Wellness

== Classes ==
- Open – Competitors of any age or experience
- Novice – Athletes who have never placed first in any class/age group in an NPC contest
- True Novice – Athletes who have never competed in an NPC contest
- Teen – The athlete must be in the age range that the promoter decides. Can range from 13–19
- Junior – The athlete must be under 23 years old or younger on the day of the event
- Master – The athlete needs to be the minimum age of the division the day of the event

== Weight Classes ==
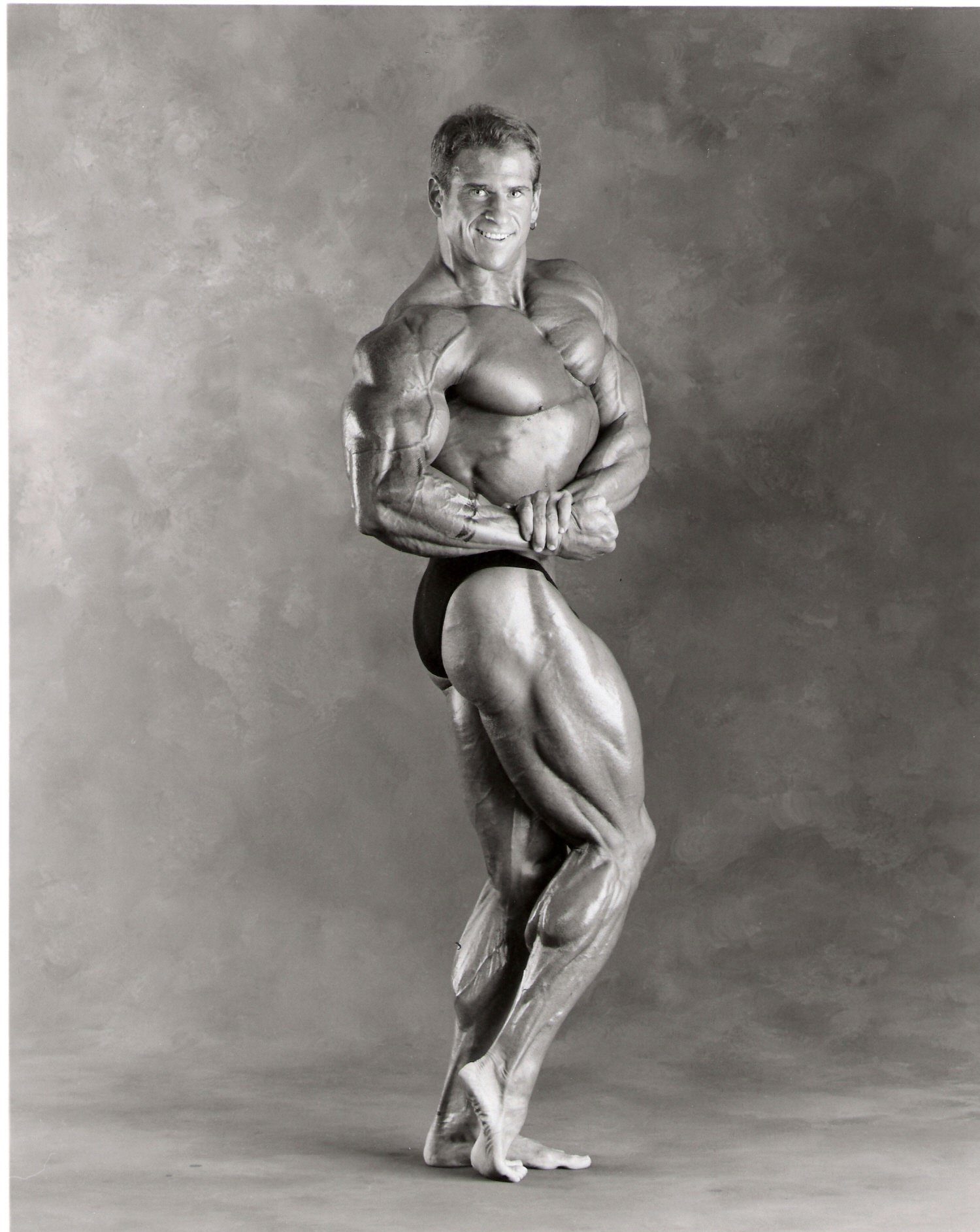
Tom Terwilliger, light heavyweight 1986 NPC National Champion

(Only relevant to specific events) 2 Classes:

- Lightweight – up to and including 125 lbs
- Heavyweight – over 125 lbs

3 Classes:

- Lightweight – up to and including 125 lbs
- Middleweight – over 125 lbs up to and including 140 lbs
- Heavyweight – over 140 lbs

4 Classes:

- Lightweight – up to and including 115 lbs
- Middleweight – over 115 lbs up to and including 125 lbs
- Light-Heavyweight – over 125 lbs up to and including 140 lbs
- Heavyweight – over 140 lbs
- Lightweight – up to and including 114.5 lbs
- Middleweight – over 114.5 lbs up to and including 125.5 lbs
- Heavyweight – over 125.5 lbs

== National Champions ==
=== Men's Overall Bodybuilding Winners ===
- 2025: Men's – Devon Barnes
- 2024: Men's – Reagan King
- 2023: Men's – Trever Burch
- 2022: Men's – Walter Debbs
- 2021: Men's – Carlos Thomas Jr.
- 2020: Men's – Jonathan Withers
- 2019: Men's – Matthew Schmidt
- 2018: Men's – Hunter Labrada
- 2017: Men's – Chris DiDomenico
- 2016: Men's – Shaun Vasquez
- 2015: Men's – Sergio Oliva Jr.
- 2014: Men's – Alexis Rolon
- 2013: Men's – Kevin Jordan
- 2012: Men's – Brian Yersky
- 2011: Men's – Todd Jewell
- 2010: Men's – Robert Burneika
- 2009: Men's - Cedric McMillan
- 2008: Men's - Edward Nunn
- 2007: Men's - Evan Centopani
- 2006: Men's - Desmond Miller
- 2005: Men's - William Wilmore
- 2004: Men's - Chris Cook
- 2003: Men's - Mat DuVall
- 2002: Men's - Toney Freeman
- 2001: Men's - Johnnie Jackson
- 2000: Men's - Victor Martinez
- 1999: Men's - Aaron Maddron
- 1998: Men's - Jason Arntz
- 1997: Men's - Tom Prince
- 1996: Men's - Willie Stalling
- 1995: Men's - Don Long
- 1994: Men's - Paul Demayo
- 1993: Men's - Michael Francois
- 1992: Men's - John Sherman
- 1991: Men's - Kevin Levrone
- 1990: Men's - Alq' Gurley
- 1989: Men's - Troy Zuccolotto
- 1988: Men's - Vince Taylor
- 1987: Men's - Shawn Ray
- 1986: Men's - Gary Strydom
- 1985: Men's - Phil Williams
- 1984: Men's - Mike Christian
- 1983: Men's - Bob Paris
- 1982: Men's - Lee Haney

== See also ==
- Bodybuilding
- Female bodybuilding
