= List of female professional bodybuilders =

This is a list of female professional bodybuilders. All people listed here have an IFBB pro card.

== A ==
- Heather Armbrust
- Lisa Aukland

== B ==
- Fannie Barrios
- Nicole Bass
- Christa Bauch
- Uyanga Bataa
- Kay Baxter
- Shelley Beattie
- Stacey Bentley
- Juliette Bergmann
- Laura Binetti
- Andrulla Blanchette
- Sheila Bleck
- Fabiola Boulanger
- Th-resa Bostick
- Debbie Bramwell-Washington
- Brigita Brezovac
- Sharon Bruneau

== C ==
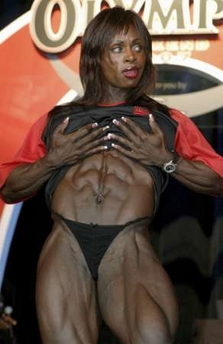
Dayana Cadeau posing against Iris Kyle at the 2007 Olympia Press Conference on 27 September 2007

- Dayana Cadeau
- Candice Carr-Archer
- Tina Chandler
- Valentina Chepiga
- Kim Chizevsky-Nicholls
- Melissa Coates
- Tazzie Colomb
- Laura Combes
- Lynn Conkwright
- Laura Creavalle
- Lisa Cross
- Candy Csencsits

== D ==
- Laura Davies
- Diana Dennis
- Carla Dunlap-Kaan
- Sarah Dunlap

== E ==
- Ritva Elomaa
- Christine Envall
- Corinna Everson

== F ==
- Heather Foster
- Bev Francis
- Anne Freitas
- Jacqueline Fuchs
- Georgia Fudge

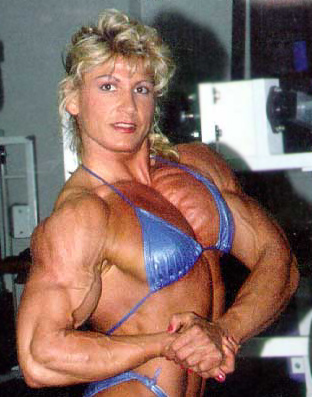
Nikki Fuller doing a side chest pose

- Nikki Fuller

== G ==
- Sue Gafner
- Ondrea Gates
- Erika Geisen
- Colette Guimond

== H ==
- Jitka Harazimova
- Kristy Hawkins
- Raye Hollitt
- Yolanda Hughes-Heying

== I ==
- Theresa Ivancik

== J ==
- Negrita Jayde

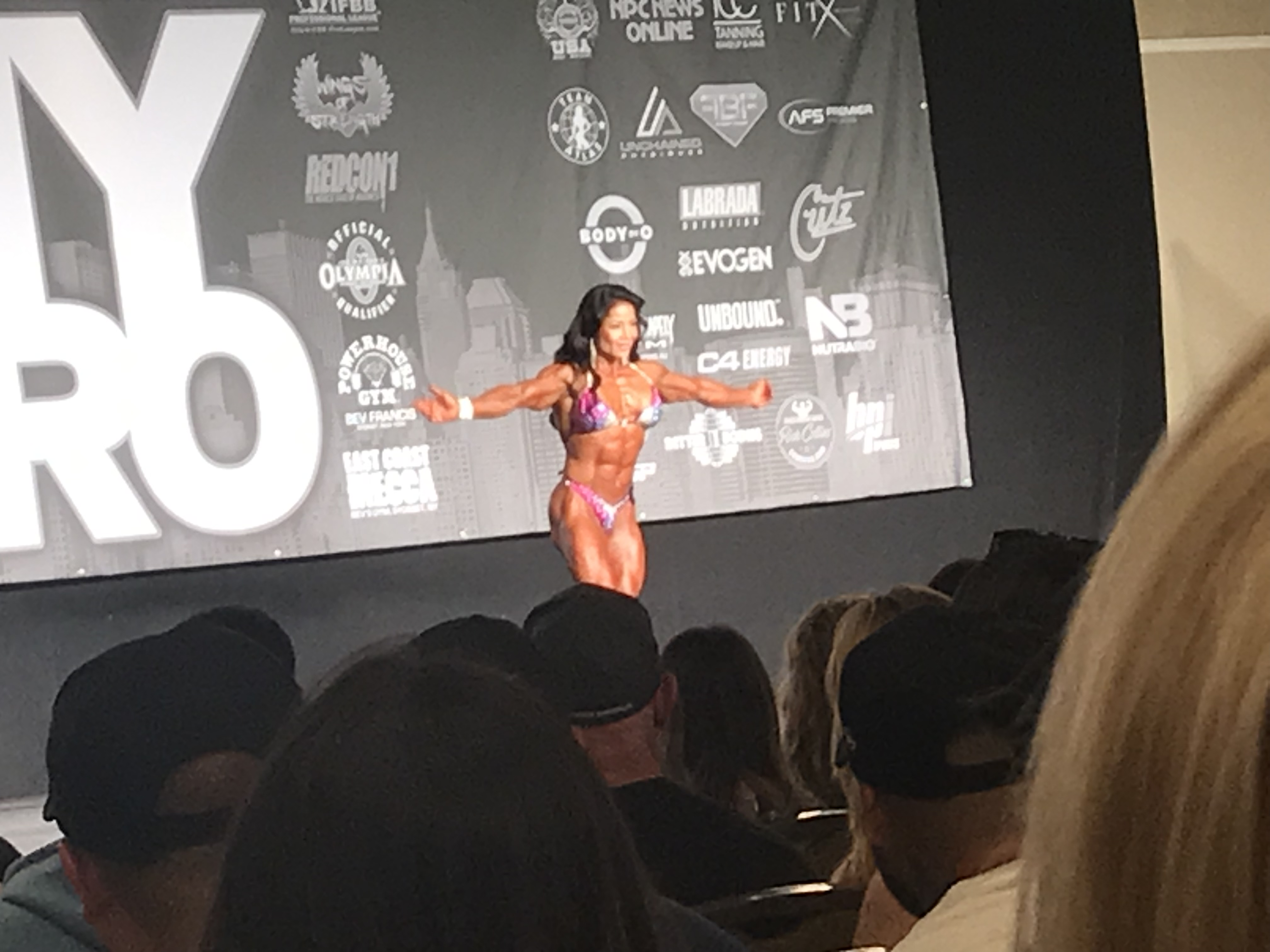
Michelle Jin posing at the 2022 IFBB New York Pro Women's Bodybuilding finals individual posing round on 21 May 2022

- Michelle Jin
- Monique Jones

== K ==
- Tonya Knight
- Marianna Komlos
- Nataliya Kuznetsova

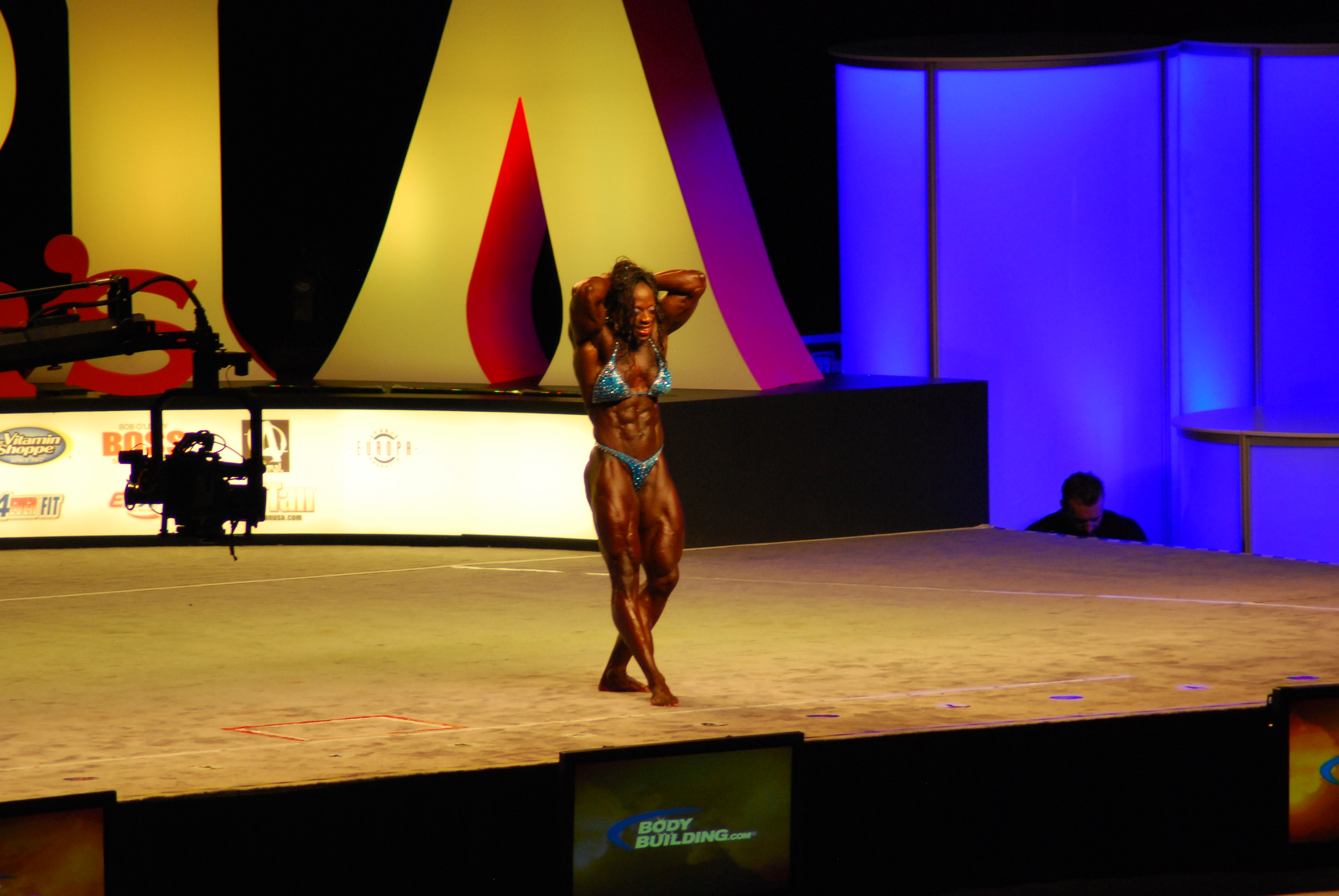
Iris Kyle doing an abdominals and thighs pose on September 26, 2008, during the 2008 Ms. Olympia finals

- Iris Kyle

== L ==
- Anja Langer
- Debi Laszewski
- Catherine LeFrançois
- Marja Lehtonen
- Cammie Lusko
- Lisa Lyon

== M ==
- Marie Mahabir
- Ellen van Maris
- Margaret V. Martin
- Denise Masino
- Rachel McLish
- Gayle Moher
- Geraldine Morgan
- Debbie Muggli
- Lenda Murray

== N ==
- Colette Nelson
- Susanne Niederhauser

== O ==
- Dona Oliveira
- Yaxeni Oriquen-Garcia
- Lora Ottenad

== P ==
- Jackie Paisley
- Cathey Palyo

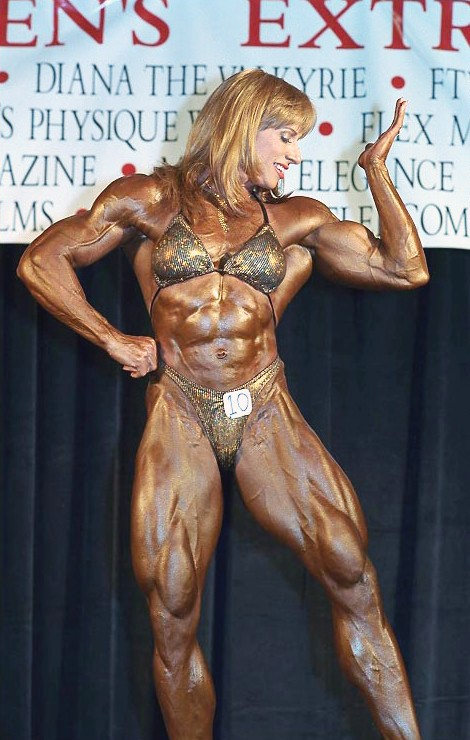
Betty Pariso posing at the 2001 Extravaganza Strength Contest on 25 August 2001

- Betty Pariso
- Debbie Patton
- Francesca Petitjean

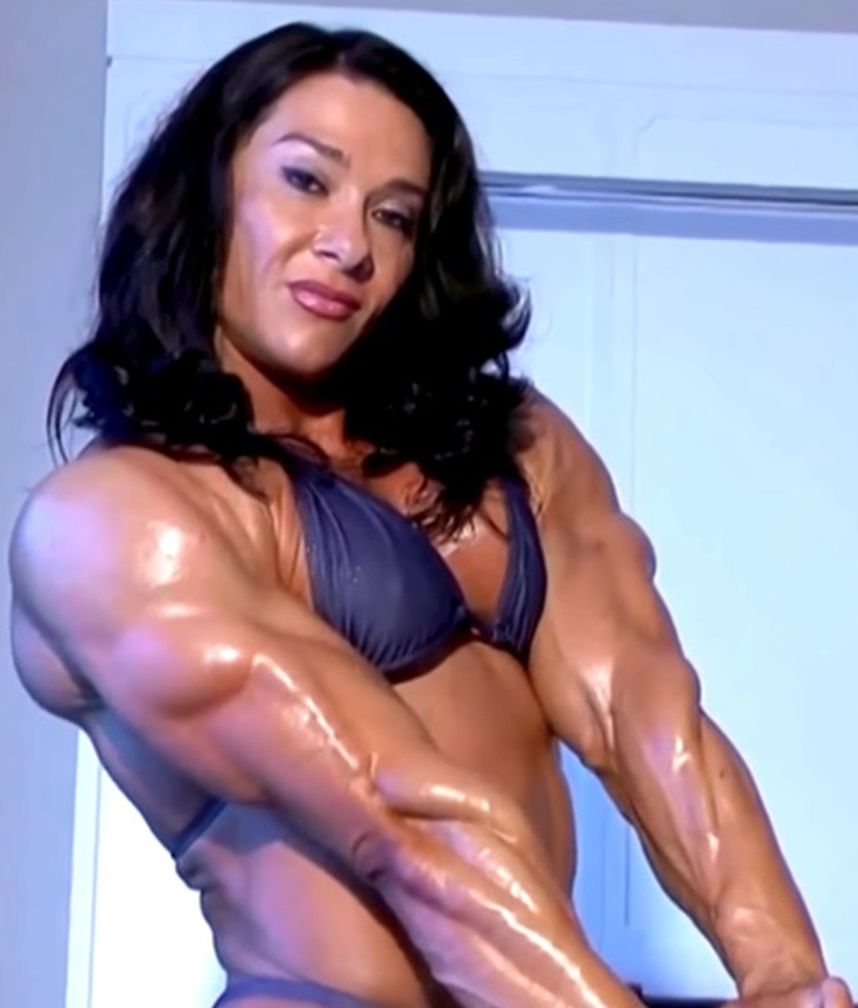
Alina Popa doing a front double triceps pose in 2017

- Alina Popa
- Gladys Portugues
- Sue Price

== Q ==
- Rhonda Lee Quaresma

== R ==
- Brenda Raganot
- Charlene Rink
- Annie Rivieccio
- Mary Roberts
- Denise Rutkowski

== S ==
- Angela Salvagno
- Peggy Schoolcraft
- Anja Schreiner
- Charla Sedacca
- Kathy Segal
- Elena Seiple
- Andrea Shaw
- Alana Shipp
- Elena Shportun-Willemer
- Carolynne Sullivan

== T ==
- Erin Thomson
- Orsi Trucza
- Helle Trevino

== V ==
- Betty Viana-Adkins

== W ==
- Rasa von Werder
- Dena Westerfield
- Claudia Wilbourn
- Christi Wolf
- Nancy Oshana Wehbe

== Y ==
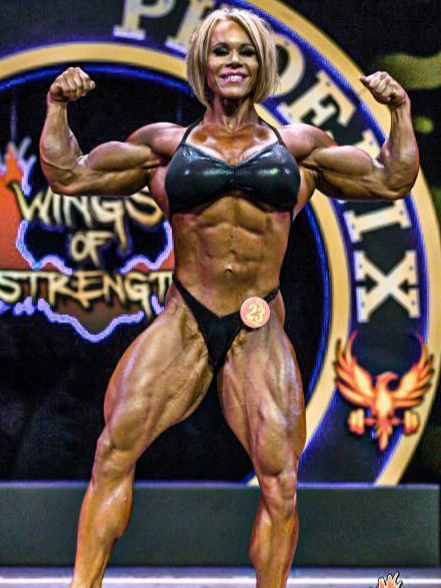
Aleesha Young doing a front double bicep pose at the 2017 Rising Phoenix World Championships on 9 September 2017

- Aleesha Young

== See also ==
- List of British bodybuilders
- List of German bodybuilders
- List of female fitness and figure competitors
