= 1993 Ms. Olympia =

Women's professional bodybuilding competition

- Promotion: IFBB
- Date: November 27, 1993
- Venue: Beacon Theatre
- City: New York City, New York, United States

Event chronology
1992 Ms. Olympia	1993 Ms. Olympia	1994 Ms. Olympia

The 1993 Ms. Olympia contest was an IFBB professional bodybuilding competition was held on November 27, 1993, at the Beacon Theatre in New York City, New York. It was the 14th Ms. Olympia competition held.

== Prize money ==
- 1st - $35,000
- 2nd - $20,000
- 3rd - $14,000
- 4th - $8,000
- 5th - $5,000
- 6th - $4,000
- 7th - $3,000
- 8th - $2,500
- 9th - $2,000
- 10th - $1,500

Total: $95,000

== Rounds ==
- Round 1 (Symmetry Round): Judging the overall balance and proportion of contestants' physiques.
- Round 2 (Muscularity Round): Focused on muscle size and definition.
- Round 3 (Compulsory Poses Round): Contestants performed mandatory poses to showcase key muscle groups.
- Round 4 (Posing Routine Round): A choreographed posing routine to music, where contestants showcased their presentation and artistic expression.

== Results ==
Place	Prize	Name
1	$50,000	(United States) Lenda Murray
2	$20,000	(United States) Denise Rutkowski
3	$10,000	(United States) Laura Creavalle
4		(United States) Debbie Muggli
5		(United States) Kim Chizevsky-Nicholls
6		(United States) Sandy Riddell
7		(United States) Shelley Beattie
8		(United States) Sharon Marvel
9		(United States) Audrey Harris
10		(Canada) Sharon Bruneau
11		(United States) Yolanda Hughes
12		(United Kingdom) Paula Bircumshaw
13		(United States) Nancy Lewis
14		(United States) Nikki Fuller
15		(United States) Diana Dennis
16		(France) Marie Mahabir
17		(Canada) Laura Binetti
18		(Germany) Christa Bauch
19		(Germany) Diana Gimmler
19		(Slovakia) Zuzana Korinkova
19		(United Kingdom) Loretta Lomax
19		(Canada) Astrid Falconi
19		(Czech Republic) Eva Sukupova
19		(Italy) Janet Marchi
19		(United Kingdom) Kimberley Jones
19		(United States) Mary Ellen Warman
19		(Japan) Yurie Iijima
19		(United States) Anita Gandol
19		(United States) Meral Ertunc
19		(United States) Kathy Unger
19		(United States) Laura Vukov
19		(France) Carol Exbrayat

=== Scorecard ===
Contestant, Country (in order of appearance)	Round 1	Round 2	Round 3	Pose Down	Final Place
Audrey Harris, USA	55	52	45		9
Shelly Beattie, USA	33	39	32		7
Sharon Marvel, USA	40	34	40		8
Debbie Muggli, USA	16	18	15	20	4
Denise Rutkowski, USA	10	13	15	14	2
Diana Dennis, USA	72	74	68		15
Nikki Fuller, USA	69	68	71		14
Kim Chizevsky, USA	28	25	25	25	5
Sharon Bruneau, Canada	45	54	55		10
Sandy Riddell, USA	26	32	34	30	6
Lenda Murray, USA	5	5	5	5	1
Nancy Lewis, USA	64	69	67		13
Laura Creavalle, Guyana	20	13	15	11	3
Yolanda Hughes, USA	52	53	54		11
Paula Bircumshaw, England	66	56	55		12
ALSO COMPETING: Janet Marchi, Italy; Anita Gandol, USA; Kimberly Ann Jones, England; Laura Vukov, Italy; Laura Binetti, Canada; Loretta Lomax, England; Marie Mahabir, France; Zuzana Korinkova, Czech Republic; Yuri Lijima, Japan; Christa Bauch, Germany; Christa Bauch, Germany; Astrid Falconi, Canada; Astrid Falconi, Canada; Carol Exbrayat, France; Kathy Unger, USA; Diana Gimmler, Germany; Mary Ellen Worman, USA; Eva Sucupova, Czech Republic; Meral Eurtec, USA.

== See also ==
- 1993 Mr. Olympia
