= 1994 Ms. Olympia =

Women's professional bodybuilding competition

- Promotion: IFBB
- Date: September 9, 1994
- City: Atlanta, Georgia, United States

Event chronology
1993 Ms. Olympia	1994 Ms. Olympia	1995 Ms. Olympia

The 1994 Ms. Olympia contest was an IFBB professional bodybuilding competition was held on September 9, 1994, in Atlanta, Georgia. It was the 15th Ms. Olympia competition held. It was held in conjunction with the 1994 Mr. Olympia and Masters Olympia.

== Prize money ==
- 1st - $35,000
- 2nd - $20,000
- 3rd - $10,000
- 4th - $7,000
- 5th - $5,000
- 6th - $4,000
- 7th - $3,000
- 8th - $2,500
- 9th - $2,000
- 10th - $1,500

Total: $90,000

== Rounds ==
- Round 1 (Symmetry Round): Judging the overall balance and proportion of contestants' physiques.
- Round 2 (Muscularity Round): Focused on muscle size and definition.
- Round 3 (Compulsory Poses Round): Contestants performed mandatory poses to showcase specific muscle groups.
- Round 4 (Posing Routine Round): A choreographed posing routine to music, emphasizing presentation, creativity, and artistic expression.

== Results ==
Place	Prize	Name
1	$50,000	(United States) Lenda Murray
2	$20,000	(United States) Laura Creavalle
3	$10,000	(United States) Debbie Muggli
4		(France) Marie Mahabir
5		(United States) Audrey Harris-White
6		(United States) Sue Price
7		(United States) Drorit Kernes
8		(United States) Yolanda Hughes
9		(France) Muriane Nicolas
10		(United States) Diana Dennis
11		(Canada) Laura Binetti
12		(Germany) Christa Bauch
13		(Czech Republic) Eva Sukupova
14		(Germany) Sabine Froschauer
15		(Germany) Gabriella Spuhn
16		(France) Fredrique Auchart
17		(France) Veronique Gady
18		(Canada) Sharon Bruneau
19		(Spain) Nuria Sala

=== Scorecard ===
Contestant, Country (in order of appearance)	Round 1	Round 2	Round 3	Pose Down	Final Place
Laura Creavalle, Guyana/USA	10	5	10	7	2
Sabine Froschauer, Germany	70	70	69		14
Eva Sukupova, Czech Republic	58	62	68		13
Debbie Muggli, USA	15	15	16	15	3
Gabriella Spuhn, Germany	77	74	73		15
Marie Laure Mahabir, France	21	21	25	21	4
Christa Bauch, Germany	58	57	57		12
Yolanda Hughes, USA	43	44	36		8
Lenda Murray, USA	5	10	5	8	1
Laura Binetti, Canada	59	52	59		11
Muriane Nicolas, France	36	42	48		9
Drorit Kernes, USA	37	34	38		7
Diana Dennis, USA	61	59	47		10
Audrey Harris White, USA	23	28	25	26	5
Sue Price, USA	36	29	28	27	6
ALSO COMPETING: Fredrque Auchart, France; Veronique Gady, France; Sharon Bruneau, Canada; Nuria Sala, Spain

== See also ==
- 1994 Mr. Olympia
