= 1995 Ms. Olympia =

Women's professional bodybuilding competition

- Promotion: IFBB
- Date: September 9, 1995
- City: Atlanta, Georgia, United States

Event chronology
1994 Ms. Olympia	1995 Ms. Olympia	1996 Ms. Olympia

The 1995 Ms. Olympia contest was an IFBB professional bodybuilding competition that was held on September 9, 1995, in Atlanta, Georgia. It was the 16th Ms. Olympia competition held.

== Prize money ==
- 1st - $50,000
- 2nd - $20,000
- 3rd - $10,000

Total: $115,000

== Rounds ==
- Round 1 (Symmetry Round): Judging the overall balance and proportion of contestants' physiques.
- Round 2 (Muscularity Round): Focused on muscle size and definition.
- Round 3 (Compulsory Poses Round): Contestants performed specific mandatory poses to highlight muscle groups.
- Round 4 (Posing Routine Round): A choreographed posing routine to music, emphasizing presentation and creativity.

== Results ==
Place	Prize	Name
1	$50,000	(United States) Lenda Murray
2	$20,000	(United States) Kim Chizevsky-Nicholls
3	$10,000	(Lithuania) Natalia Murnikoviene
4		(United States) Sue Price
5		(United States) Laura Creavalle
6		(United States) Debbie Muggli
7		(United Kingdom) Joanne Lee
8		(United States) Michele Ralabate
9		(Czech Republic) Eva Sukupova
10		(United States) Nancy Lewis
11		(United States) Yolanda Hughes
12		(Canada) Laura Binetti
13		(France) Marie Mahabir
14		(France) Muriane Nicolas

=== Scorecard ===
CONTESTANT, COUNTRY (IN ORDER OF APPEARANCE)	ROUND 1	ROUND 2	ROUND 3	POSE DOWN	FINAL PLACE
DEBBIE MUGGLI, USA	32	30	28	27	6
SUE PRICE, USA	20	24	21	21	4
LAURA CREAVALLE, USA/ (Guyana) GUYANA	24	26	31	27	5
EVA SUKUPOVA, (Czech Republic) CZECH REPUBLIC	52	47	48	-	9
NANCY LEWIS, USA	52	47	48	-	9
KIM CHIZEVSKY, USA	10	5	10	9	2
JOANNE LEE, (England) ENGLAND	33	31	33	-	7
MICHELE RALABATE, USA	47	45	38	-	8
LENDA MURRAY, USA	5	10	5	6	1
NATALIA MURNIKOVIENE, (Lithuania) LITHUANIA	18	15	15	15	3
ALSO COMPETED: KARIN PETZ, (Germany) GERMANY; YVONNE VAZQUEZ, USA; YOLANDA HUGHES, USA; LAURA BINETTI, (Canada) CANADA; MURIANE NOCCLAS, (France) FRANCE; MARIE MAHABIR, (France) FRANCE; NOEL CHRISTINE, (France) FRANCE.

== Notable events ==
- This Ms. Olympia, along with the 1996 Ms. Olympia, had the highest total prize money at a Ms. Olympia, with $115,000, with $50,000 for the winner.

== See also ==
- 1995 Mr. Olympia
