= 2000 Ms. Olympia =

Women's professional bodybuilding competition

- Promotion: IFBB
- Date: October 21, 2000
- Venue: Mandalay Bay Arena
- City: (United States) Las Vegas, Nevada

Event chronology
1999 Ms. Olympia	2000 Ms. Olympia	2001 Ms. Olympia

The 2000 Ms. Olympia contest is an IFBB professional bodybuilding competition and part of Joe Weider's Olympia Fitness & Performance Weekend 2000 that was held on October 21, 2000, at the Mandalay Bay Arena in Paradise, Nevada. It was the 21st Ms. Olympia competition held. Other events at the exhibition include the Mr. Olympia and Fitness Olympia contests.

== Prize money ==
- 1st (Lightweight (LW)) - $10,000
- 1st (Heavyweight (HW)) - $10,000
- 2nd (LW) - $6,000
- 2nd (HW) - $6,000
- 3rd (LW) - $4,000
- 3rd (HW) - $4,000

Total: $40,000

== Rounds ==
- Round 1 (Symmetry Round): Judging the balance and proportion of contestants' physiques.
- Round 2 (Muscularity/Conditioning Round): Emphasizing muscle size, definition, and overall conditioning, including leanness and separation.
- Round 3 (Compulsory Poses Round): Required specific poses to evaluate muscle groups uniformly across contestants.
- Round 4 (Posedown Round): Contestants engaged in a final posedown, directly comparing their physiques for the judges.

== Weight-in ==
Heavyweights over 135 pounds:

- Lesa Lewis - 165 lb (75 kg)
- Yaxeni Oriquen - 160 lb (73 kg)
- Vickie Gates - 141 lb (64 kg)
- Valentina Chepiga - 136 lb (62 kg)

Lightweights up to 135 pounds:

- Andrulla Blanchette - 134 lb (61 kg)
- Renee Casella - 133 lb (60 kg)
- Brenda Raganot - 132 lb (60 kg)

== Pre-judging ==
=== Round 1 ===
==== Lightweight call outs ====
- 1st - Andrulla Blanchette, Brenda Raganot, and Renee Casella
- 2nd - Jennifer McVicar and Cathy LeFrançois Priest

==== Heavyweight call outs ====
- 1st - Lesa Lewis, Vickie Gates, and Valentina Chepiga
- 2nd - Iris Kyle, Th-resa Bostick, Denise Hoshor, and Yaxeni Oriquen

=== Round 2 ===
==== Lightweight call outs ====
- 1st - Renee Casella, Andrulla Blanchette, and Brenda Raganot
- 2nd - Cathy LeFrançois Priest and Jennifer McVicar

==== Heavyweight call outs ====
- 1st - Lesa Lewis, Vickie Gates, and Valentina Chepiga
- 2nd - Iris Kyle, Denise Hoshor, Th-resa Bostick, and Yaxeni Oriquen

== Results ==
=== Scorecard ===
Place	Name	Country	1	2	3	4	Total
-- Heavyweights over 135 lbs --
1	Valentina Chepiga	(Ukraine)	6	5	5	5	21
2	Vickie Gates	(United States)	9	10	10	10	39
3	Lesa Lewis	(United States)	15	15	15	15	60
4	Yaxeni Oriquen-Garcia	(Venezuela)	21	21	24		66
5	Iris Kyle	(United States)	25	24	22		71
6	Denise Hoshor	(United States)	29	30	30		89
7	Th-resa Bostick	(United States)	35	35	35		105
-- Lightweights up to 135 lbs --
1	Andrulla Blanchette	(United Kingdom)	10	5	9	9	33
2	Brenda Raganot	(United States)	5	13	12	12	42
3	Renee Casella	(United States)	15	12	12	12	51
4	Cathy LeFrançois Priest	(Canada)	20	20	20		60
5	Jennifer McVicar	(United States)	24	25	25		74

== Attended ==
- 5th Ms. Olympia attended - Vickie Gates
- 4th Ms. Olympia attended - Lesa Lewis and Andrulla Blanchette
- 3rd Ms. Olympia attended - Valentina Chepiga and Yaxeni Oriquen-Garcia
- 2nd Ms. Olympia attended - Renee Casella, Iris Kyle, and Brenda Raganot
- 1st Ms. Olympia attended - Th-resa Bostick, Denise Hoshor, Cathy LeFrançois, and Jennifer McVicar
- Previous year Olympia attendees who did not attend - Laura Binetti, Kim Chizevsky, Tazzie Colomb, Laura Creavalle, and Gayle Moher

== Notable events ==
- This competition had only 12 competitors competing, the fewest competitors competing in Ms. Olympia ever. Only the 1996 Ms. Olympia would match this to have 12 competitors competing.
- Mike Alley and Corinna Everson were the commentators for ESPN2 coverage of the 2000 Ms. Olympia.
- Jennifer McVicar received a special invite to attend the 2000 Ms. Olympia.
- Valentina Chepiga was upset when she was weighed in and weighed over 135 lbs, making her compete in the heavyweight division.
- Bev Francis was one of the judges of the 2000 Ms. Olympia.

=== 2000 Ms. Olympia changes ===
The IFBB introduced several changes to Ms. Olympia in 2000. The first change was that Ms. Olympia contest would no longer be held as a separate contest, instead became part of the "Olympia Weekend" in Las Vegas and held the day before the men's show. The second change was when heavyweight and lightweight classes where added. The third change was the new judging guidelines for presentations were introduced. A letter to the competitors from Jim Manion (chairman of the Professional Judges Committee) stated that women would be judged on healthy appearance, face, makeup, and skin tone. The criteria given in Manion's letter included the statement "symmetry, presentation, separations, and muscularity BUT NOT TO THE EXTREME!" The 2000 Ms. Olympia is the only Ms. Olympia with no overall winner, with Andrulla Blanchette winning lightweight class and Valentina Chepiga winning heavyweight class.

== See also ==
- 2000 Mr. Olympia
