= 1992 Ms. Olympia =

Women's professional bodybuilding competition

- Promotion: IFBB
- Date: October 17, 1992
- Venue: Arie Crown Theater
- City: Chicago, Illinois, United States

Event chronology
1991 Ms. Olympia	1992 Ms. Olympia	1993 Ms. Olympia

The 1992 Ms. Olympia contest was an IFBB professional bodybuilding competition was held on October 17, 1992, at the Arie Crown Theater in Chicago, Illinois. It was the 13th Ms. Olympia competition held.

== Prize money ==
- 1st - $50,000
- 2nd - $20,000
- 3rd - $13,000
- 4th - $7,500
- 5th - $5,000
- 6th - $4,000
- 7th - $3,000
- 8th - $2,500
- 9th - $2,000
- 10th - $1,500

Total: $108,500

== Rounds ==
- Round 1 (Symmetry Round): Judging the overall balance and proportion of the contestants' physiques.
- Round 2 (Muscularity Round): Focused on muscle size and definition.
- Round 3 (Compulsory Poses Round): Contestants performed mandatory poses to showcase key muscle groups.
- Round 4 (Posing Routine Round): A choreographed posing routine to music, where contestants emphasized their presentation and artistic expression.

== Results ==
Place	Prize	Name
1	$50,000	(United States) Lenda Murray
2	$20,000	(United States) Laura Creavalle
3	$10,000	(United States) Shelley Beattie
4		(United States) Sandy Riddell
5		(United States) Diana Dennis
6		(Germany) Anja Schreiner
7		(Italy) Claudia Montemaggi
8		(United States) Yolanda Hughes
9		(United States) Nikki Fuller
10		(United States) Debbie Muggli
11		(Canada) Sharon Bruneau
12		(United States) Sue Gafner
13		(United States) Sharon Marvel
14		(United States) Nancy Lewis
15		(United States) Audrey Harris
16		(Hungary) Gabriella Szikszay
17		(Canada) Sandra Blackie
18		(Germany) Diana Gimmler
19		(United States) Skye Ryland
20		(Czechoslovakia) Eva Sukupova

=== Scorecard ===
Contestant, Country (in order of appearance)	Round 1	Round 2	Round 3	Pose Down	Final Place
Gabriella Szikszay, Hungary	76	74	75	-	16
Sandy Riddell, USA	15	21	28	24	4
Sandra Blackie, Canada	87	88	87	-	17
Yolanda Hughes, USA	40	38	26	-	8
Lenda Murray, USA	5	9	5	5	1
Debbie Moggli, USA	48	47	49	-	10
Shelley Beattie, USA	20	16	15	16	3
Claudia Montemaggi, Italy	28	25	25	25	5
Nancy Lewis, USA	66	68	68	-	14
Skye Ryland, USA	90	91	89	-	19
Sharon Bruneau, Canada	58	53	48	-	11
Diana Dennis, USA	28	29	29	20	5
Anja Schreiner, Germany	33	31	37	30	6
Diana Gimmler, Germany	86	88	89	-	18
Nikki Fuller, USA	48	41	43	-	9
Susan Gafner, USA	66	59	61	-	12
Audrey Harris, USA	68	76	77	-	15
Eva Sukupova, Czech.	99	99	100	-	20
Sharon Marvel, USA	64	68	67	-	13
Laura Creavalle, Guyanna	13	6	10	10	2

== See also ==
- 1992 Mr. Olympia
