= 1991 Ms. Olympia =

Bodybuilding competition

- Promotion: IFBB
- Date: October 12–13, 1991
- Venue: Shrine Auditorium
- City: Los Angeles, California, United States

Event chronology
| 1990 Ms. Olympia | 1991 Ms. Olympia | 1992 Ms. Olympia |

The 1991 Ms. Olympia contest was an IFBB professional bodybuilding competition was held on October 12 and 13, 1991 at the Shrine Auditorium in Los Angeles, California. It was the 12th Ms. Olympia competition held.

== Prize money ==
- 1st - $35,000
- 2nd - $20,000
- 3rd - $13,000
- 4th - $7,500
- 5th - $5,000
- 6th - $4,000
- 7th - $3,000
- 8th - $2,500
- 9th - $2,000
- 10th - $1,500

Total: $93,500

== Rounds ==
- Round 1 (Symmetry Round): Judging the overall balance and proportion of the contestants' physiques.
- Round 2 (Muscularity Round): Focused on muscle size and definition.
- Round 3 (Compulsory Poses Round): Contestants performed mandatory poses to showcase key muscle groups.
- Round 4 (Posing Routine Round): A choreographed posing routine to music, emphasizing the contestants' creativity, presentation skills, and artistic expression.

== Results ==
| Place | Country | Name |
|---|---|---|
| 1 | (United States) Southfield, Michigan | Lenda Murray |
| 2 | (Australia) New York City, New York | Bev Francis |
| 3 | (United States) Venice, California | Laura Creavalle |
| 4 | (United States) Scottsdale, Arizona | Sandy Riddell |
| 5 | (United States) Edgewater, New Jersey | Sharon Marvel |
| 6 | (United States) Newport Beach, California | Diana Dennis |
| 7 | (United States) Portland, Oregon | Shelley Beattie |
| 8 | Baden-Württemberg, Germany | Anja Schreiner |
| 9 | Rimini, Italy | Claudia Montemaggi |
| 10 | (United States) Tustin, California | Sue Gafner |
| 11 | (United States) Scottsdale, Arizona | Jackie Paisley |
| 12 | Le Port-Marly, France | Marie Mahabir |
| 13 | (Netherlands) Venice, California | Hanny Van Aken |
| 14 | Como, Italy | Claudia Profanter |
| 15 | (United States) San Diego, California | Lisa Lorio |
| 16 | Montreal, Canada | Sandra Blackie |
| 16 | (United States) Venice, California | Laura Beaudry |
| 16 | (United States) Orlando, Florida | Audrey Harris |
| 16 | (United States) Miami, Florida | Gillian Hodge |
| 16 | (Czechoslovakia) Žilina, Czech and Slovak Federative Republic | Zuzana Korinkova |
| 16 | Munich, Germany | Jutta Tipelt |

=== Scorecard ===
| Contestant Country (In order of appearance) | Round 1 | Round 2 | Round 3 | Pose Down | Final Place |
|---|---|---|---|---|---|
| Marie Mahabir, France | 58 | 48 | 59 | | 12 |
| Shelley Beattie, (United States) USA | 38 | 38 | 35 | 30 | 7 |
| Laura Creavalle, Guyana | 22 | 13 | 15 | 15 | 3 |
| Diana Dennis, (United States) USA | 42 | 30 | 25 | | 6 |
| Claudia Profanter, Italy | 65 | 64 | 69 | | 14 |
| Sandy Riddell, (United States) USA | 16 | 23 | 22 | 20 | 4 |
| Lenda Murray, (United States) USA | 8 | 10 | 5 | 8 | 1 |
| Lisa Lorio, (United States) USA | 64 | 73 | 3 | | 15 |
| Anja Schreiner, Germany | 34 | 46 | 45 | | 8 |
| Bev Francis, Australia | 7 | 7 | 10 | 8 | 2 |
| Claudia Montemaggi, Italy | 50 | 50 | 43 | | 9 |
| Jackie Paisley, (United States) USA | 53 | 55 | 55 | | 11 |
| Hanny Van Aken, (Netherlands) Holland | 69 | 63 | 65 | | 13 |
| Sue Gafner, (United States) USA | 52 | 50 | 51 | | 10 |
| Sharon Marvel, (United States) USA | 22 | 22 | 23 | 25 | 5 |
ALSO COMPETED: Laura Beaudry, USA. Sandra Blackie, Canada. Audrey Harris, USA. Gillian Hodge, Trinidad and Tobago. Zuzana Kornakova, Czechoslovakia. Jutta Tippelt, Germany.

== Notable events ==
- Lenda Murray won her second Ms. Olympia consecutively, trying with Rachel McLish's record two Ms. Olympia wins, along with trying with Larry Scott's record two consecutive Mr. Olympia wins, along with Franco Columbu's record two overall Mr. Olympia wins.
  - After the 1991 Ms. Olympia prejudging (rounds 1 & 2) and going into the 1991 Ms. Olympia evening finals, Bev Francis lead Lenda Murray by a score of 14 to 18. Entertainment and Sports Programming Network (ESPN), in an unprecedented move for professional bodybuilding, flashed up the half time scores for the audience to see that Bev was in the lead. After rounds 3 & 4, Lenda edged out Bev, with the slimmest margin of victory for any Ms. Olympia winner, by a final score of 31 to 32. Peter McGough, bodybuilding journalist and historian, called the decision to award Lenda the 1991 Ms. Olympia as the "most controversial result in the event’s history".
  - In an interview with John Romano, Lenda said that before the finals she heard Benjamin "Ben" Weider and Josef "Joe" Weider and "did something" and called the decision to award her 1991 Ms. Olympia as a "business decision". She thought it probably could have been both Ben and the ESPN brass behind awarding her the 1991 Ms. Olympia.
- This was the first Ms. Olympia contest, the 1991 Ms. Olympia finals, to be televised live on ESPN.
- The two emcees of the 1991 Ms. Olympia was Jake Steinfeld and Carla Dunlap-Kaan.
- Rachel McLish was awarded bodybuilding's Lifetime Achievement Award by Joe Weider.
- This is the first Ms. Olympia since 1984 to not drug test. Every Ms. Olympia after 1991 would also not drug test.

== See also ==
- 1991 Mr. Olympia
