= 1999 Ms. Olympia =

Women's professional bodybuilding competition

- Promotion: IFBB
- Date: October 2, 1999
- City: Secaucus, New Jersey, United States

Event chronology
1998 Ms. Olympia	1999 Ms. Olympia	2000 Ms. Olympia

The 1999 Ms. Olympia contest was an IFBB professional bodybuilding competition held October 2, 1999, in Secaucus, New Jersey, alongside the 1999 Women's Pro Extravaganza. It was the 20th Ms. Olympia competition held.

== Prize money ==
- 1st - $25,000
- 2nd - $10,000
- 3rd - $7,000
- 4th - $4,000
- 5th - $3,000
- 6th - $1,000

Total: $50,000

== Rounds ==
- Round 1 (Symmetry Round): Judging contestants on balance and proportion.
- Round 2 (Muscularity/Conditioning Round): Focused on muscle size, definition, and overall conditioning, including muscle separation and leanness.
- Round 3 (Compulsory Poses Round): Contestants performed mandatory poses to highlight specific muscle groups.
- Round 4 (Posing Routine Round): A choreographed routine to music, emphasizing presentation, creativity, and overall stage presence.

== Competitors height & weight ==
- Lesa Lewis - 5’10”, 190 lb (86 kg)
- Yaxeni Oriquen-Garcia - 5’9”, 180 lb (82 kg)
- Brenda Raganot - 5’3”, 180 lb (82 kg)
- Tazzie Colomb - 5’7”, 172 lb (78 kg)
- Kim Chizevsky-Nicholls - 5’8”, 162 lb (73 kg)
- Iris Kyle - 5’7”, 155 lb (70 kg)
- Laura Binetti - 5’3”, 150 lb (68 kg)
- Vickie Gates - 5’4”, 145 lb (66 kg)
- Valentina Chepiga - 5’4”, 141 lb (64 kg)
- Laura Creavalle - 5’4”, 141 lb (64 kg)
- Andrulla Blanchette - 5’3”, 140 lb (64 kg)
- Gayle Moher - 5’4”, 135 lb (61 kg)

== Pre-judging ==
=== Symmetry round ===
In this round the judges are looking for the overall muscle balance; that the proportion of muscle is distributed evenly over the bodybuilder's frame.

- Brenda Ragonot, Laura Binetti, Andrulla Blanchette, Vickie Gates, Laura Creavalle, Tazzie Colomb, Valentina Chepiga, Gayle Moher, Yaxeni Oriquen, Lesa Lewis, Iris Kyle, Kim Chizevsky
- Kim Chizevsky, Iris Kyle, Lesa Lewis, Yaxeni Oriquen, Gayle Moher, Valentina Chepiga, Tazzie Colomb, Laura Creavalle, Vickie Gates, Andrlla Blanchette, Laura Binetti, and Brenda Ragonot

== Results ==
- 1st - Kim Chizevsky-Nicholls
- 2nd - Vickie Gates
- 3rd - Laura Creavalle
- 4th - Iris Kyle
- 5th - Lesa Lewis
- 6th - Tazzie Colomb
- 7th - Andrulla Blanchette
- 8th - Laura Binetti
- 9th - Brenda Raganot
- 10th - Yaxeni Oriquen-Garcia
- 11th - Gayle Moher
- 12th - Valentina Chepiga

=== Scorecard ===
No	Name	Country	Round 1	Round 2	Round 3	Round 4	Total
1	Kim Chizevsky	(United States)	5	5	5	5	20
2	Iris Kyle	(United States)	22	17	26	20	85
3	Lesa Lewis	(United States)	17	27	20	25	89
4	Yaxeni Oriquen-Garcia	(Venezuela)	52	46	48		146
5	Gayle Moher	(United Kingdom)	52	55	55		162
6	Valentina Chepiga	(Ukraine)	60	60	50		180
7	Tazzie Colomb	(United States)	35	29	30	39	123
8	Laura Creavalle	(United States)	20	18	10	13	61
9	Vickie Gates	(United States)	10	10	15	12	47
10	Andrulla Blanchette	(United Kingdom)	29	35	35		99
11	Laura Binetti	(Canada)	41	40	41		122
12	Brenda Raganot	(United States)	45	49	45		139

== Attended ==
- 12th Ms. Olympia attended - Laura Creavalle
- 6th Ms. Olympia attended - Kim Chizevsky-Nicholls
- 5th Ms. Olympia attended - Laura Binetti
- 4th Ms. Olympia attended - Vickie Gates
- 3rd Ms. Olympia attended - Lesa Lewis, Gayle Moher, and Andrulla Blanchette
- 2nd Ms. Olympia attended - Tazzie Colomb, Valentina Chepiga, and Yaxeni Oriquen-Garcia
- 1st Ms. Olympia attended - Iris Kyle and Brenda Raganot
- Previous year Olympia attendees who did not attend - Dayana Cadeau, Yolanda Hughes, Chris Bongiovanni, Zdenka Turda, Jacqueline De Gennaro, Jitka Harazimova, Beate Drabing, and Sipka Berska

== Notable events ==
- This was Kim Chizevsky's 4th overall and consecutive Olympia win. This was also Kim's last Olympia before she retired from bodybuilding.
- This was Iris Kyle's first Olympia she attended.

=== Rescheduling ===
The 1999 Ms. Olympia was originally scheduled to be held on 9 October in Santa Monica, California. However, one month before the scheduled date, the IFBB announced that the contest had been cancelled. The main cause was the withdrawal of promoter Jarka Kastnerova (who promoted the 1998 contest in Prague) for financial reasons, including a low number of advance ticket sales for the 1999 event. The backlash following the announcement led to a flurry of activity, with the contest being rescheduled as part of the Women's Extravaganza (promoted by Kenny Kassel and Bob Bonham) in Secaucus, New Jersey, on 2 October. Last minute sponsorship came from several sources, most significantly in the form of $50,000 from Flex magazine.

== See also ==
- Women's Pro Extravaganza
- 1999 Mr. Olympia
