= Bodybuilders (On the Inside) =

2000 bodybuilding documentary

26 September 2021

"Bodybuilders" was originally shot and aired in the year 2000 as an episode of the Discovery Channel documentary series called On the Inside. This particular episode went into the sport of bodybuilding at the turn of the millennium, bringing light to various depths of bodybuilding that the general public had little awareness of at the time—particularly natural bodybuilding. This episode aired for 8 years on 4 different networks. It inspired countless of thousands of people to achieve healthier greater physiques. Of all the bodybuilding documentaries, in terms of popularity, it comes second only to Pumping Iron, which was the documentary that turned Arnold Schwarzenegger into a household name. It also featured the former Incredible Hulk actor, Lou Ferrigno.

== Cast ==
Internet Movie Data Base (IMDb) credited cast list: Arnold Schwarzenegger, Lesa Lewis, Lou Ferrigno, Frank Zane, Jay Cutler, Kim Chizevsky-Nicholls, Stan McQuay, Corinna Everson, Craig Titus, Joe Weider, Ben Weider, and Travis Wojcik.

- Arnold Schwarzenegger
- Corrina Everson
- Lesa Lewis
- Denise Hoshor
- Yaxeni Oriquen-Garcia
- Andrulla Blanchette
- Yolanda Hughes-Heying
- Kim Chizevsky-Nicholls
- Valentina Chepiga
- Renee Casella
- Lora Ottenad
- Joe Weider
- Chad Nicholls
- Craig Titus
- Frank Zane
- Jan Tana
- Cynthia James
- Iris Kyle
- Jennifer McVicar
- Th-resa Bostick
- Ben Weider
- Brenda Raganot
- Ondrea Gates
- James Manion
- Wayne DeMilia
- Travis Wojcik
