= Nemesis 2: Nebula =

1995 science fiction film

- Promotional release poster
- Directed by: Albert Pyun
- Written by: Rebecca Charles; Albert Pyun
- Produced by: Tom Karnowski; Gary Schmoeller
- Starring: Sue Price; Tina Coté; Earl White; Jahi J.J. Zuri; Chad Stahelski
- Cinematography: George Mooradian
- Edited by: Ken Morrisey
- Music by: Anthony Riparetti
- Distributed by: Imperial Entertainment
- Release dates: July 21, 1995 (Japan); September 26, 1995 (US)
- Running time: 83 minutes
- Countries: United States; Denmark
- Language: English

Nemesis 2: Nebula is a 1995 science fiction film directed by Albert Pyun. The sequel to Nemesis (1992), it stars Sue Price, Tina Coté, Earl White, Jahi J.J. Zuri, and Chad Stahelski. Nemesis 2 was shot in Globe, Arizona. It was followed by Nemesis 3: Prey Harder and Nemesis 4: Death Angel, both released in 1996. Is the second installment in the Nemesis film series.

A compilation version exists which combined the four Nemesis films into one 100-minute feature that Scanbox was going to release before the company went bankrupt in 2000. This version was released only in Eastern Europe in 2003, primarily in Poland.

== Plot ==
Seventy-three years after Alex failed, humans have lost the Cyborg Wars and they are now slaves to the cyborg masters. Rebel scientists have developed a new DNA strain which could signal the end of the cyborgs, and it is injected it into a pregnant volunteer.

When the cyborgs learn of the woman and her baby, both are listed for termination. To escape, she steals a cyborg ship and is transported back in time to East Africa in 1980, where the mother is killed but the baby is saved. It takes 20 years, but a cyborg bounty hunter named Nebula eventually locates the young woman, named Alex, and travels back in time to terminate her.

== Cast ==
- Sue Price as Alex
  - Zachary Studer as Young Alex
- Chad Stahelski as Nebula
- Tina Coté as Emily
- Earl White as Po / Juna
- Jahi J.J. Zuri as Zumi / Rebel #2
- Karen Studer as Zana
- Sharon Bruneau as Lock
- Debbie Muggli as Ditko
- Dave Fisher as Oslo
- Richard Cetrone as Rebel Mercenary Soldier #1

== Reception ==
One reviewer noted that the film appeared to have been an unrelated film involving aliens that was repurposed as a Nemesis sequel and was critical of Price's performance, weak storyline and minimal relation to the original film, a theme that he later brought up in his review of the sequel.

== Sequel ==
A sequel titled Nemesis 3: Prey Harder, was released in 1996.
