= 1997 Ms. Olympia =

Women's professional bodybuilding competition

- Promotion: IFBB
- Date: November 22, 1997
- Venue: Beacon Theatre
- City: New York City, New York, United States

Event chronology
1996 Ms. Olympia	1997 Ms. Olympia	1998 Ms. Olympia

The 1997 Ms. Olympia contest was an IFBB professional bodybuilding competition that was held on November 22, 1997, at the Beacon Theatre in New York City, New York. It was the 18th Ms. Olympia competition held.

== Prize money ==
- 1st - $50,000
- 2nd - $20,000
- 3rd - $10,000
- 4th - $6,000
- 5th - $5,000
- 6th - $3,000
- 7th - $2,500
- 8th - $2,000
- 9th - $1,500
- 10th - $1,000

Total: $101,000

== Rounds ==
- Round 1 (Symmetry Round): Judging the overall balance and proportion of contestants' physiques.
- Round 2 (Muscularity/Conditioning Round): Focused on muscle size, definition, and conditioning, emphasizing leanness and muscle separation.
- Round 3 (Compulsory Poses Round): Contestants performed mandatory poses to highlight their muscle groups and overall physique.
- Round 4 (Posing Routine Round): A choreographed routine to music, showcasing contestants' presentation skills and creativity.

== Results ==
=== Scorecard ===
CONTESTANT, COUNTRY (IN ORDER OF APPEARANCE)	RND 1	RND 2	RND 3	POSE DOWN	FINAL PLACE
LAURA CREAVALLE, (Guyana)	23	23	20	23	4
KIM CHIZEVSKY, (United States)	10	5	8	5	1
NANCY LEWIS, (United States)	54	45	54		10
MELISSA COATES, (Canada)	40	50	66		11
LAURA BINETTI, (United States)	66	68	64		13
VICKIE GATES, (United States)	24	20	25	22	5
SUE MYERS, (United States)	47	57	45		9
CHRIS BONGIOVANNI, (United States)	56	42	48		8
YOLANDA HUGHES, (United States)	16	17	15	15	3
TAZZIE COLOMB, (United States)	84	83	86		17
EVA SUKUPOVA, (Czech Republic)	74	81	73		16
VALERIE GANGI, (United States)	69	71	70		15
GAYLE MOHER, (United States)	52	56	53		12
NICOLE BASS, (United States)	61	71	68		14
ANDRULLA BLANCHETTE, (United Kingdom)	49	36	33		7
LENDA MURRAY, (United States)	5	10	7	10	2
ZDENKA TURDA, (Czech Republic)	86	90	86		18
JITKA HARAZIMOVA, (Czech Republic)	26	33	34		6

== Notable events ==
- Nicole Bass, at 204 lb (93 kg), was the heaviest Ms. Olympia competitor to compete by this point.

== See also ==
- 1997 Mr. Olympia
