= Guimond =

Guimond is a surname. Guimont is the original French spelling. Notable people with the surname include:

- Arthé Guimond (1931–2013), Canadian Roman Catholic bishop
- Claude Guimond (born 1963), Canadian politician
- Colette Guimond (born 1961), Canadian bodybuilder
- Janie Guimond (born 1984), Canadian volleyball player
- Joshua Guimond (born 1982), American man who disappeared in 2002
- Michel Guimond (1953–2015), Canadian politician
- Sacha Guimond (born 1991), Canadian ice hockey player

== See also ==
- Vimont (disambiguation)
- Sainte-Anne-de-Beaupré
