= Professional bodybuilders =

Professional bodybuilders may refer to:

- Individuals who participate in professional bodybuilding
- List of female professional bodybuilders
- List of male professional bodybuilders
