= 1998 Ms. Olympia =

Women's professional bodybuilding competition

- Promotion: IFBB
- Date: October 24, 1998
- Venue: Municipal House
- City: Prague, Czech Republic

Event chronology
1997 Ms. Olympia	1998 Ms. Olympia	1999 Ms. Olympia

The 1998 Ms. Olympia contest was an IFBB professional bodybuilding competition was held on October 24, 1998, in Prague, Czech Republic. It was the 19th Ms. Olympia competition held.

== Prize money ==
- 1st - $25,000
- 2nd - $10,000
- 3rd - $7,000

Total: $50,000

== Rounds ==
- Round 1 (Symmetry Round): Judging the overall balance and proportion of contestants' physiques.
- Round 2 (Muscularity/Conditioning Round): Emphasizing muscle size, definition, and conditioning, including leanness and muscle separation.
- Round 3 (Compulsory Poses Round): Contestants performed mandatory poses to highlight key muscle groups.
- Round 4 (Posing Routine Round): A choreographed routine to music, focusing on presentation and creativity.

== Results ==
- 1st - Kim Chizevsky-Nicholls
- 2nd - Yolanda Hughes
- 3rd - Vickie Gates
- 5th - Lesa Lewis
- 5th - Laura Creavalle
- 6th - Andrulla Blanchette
- 7th - Jitka Harazimova
- 8th - Eva Sukupova
- 9th - Chris Bongiovanni
- 10th - Yaxeni Oriquen-Garcia
- 11th - Gayle Moher
- 12th - Valentina Chepiga
- 13th - Zdenka Tvrda
- 14th - Dayana Cadeau
- 15th - Jackie DeGennaro
- 16th - Beate Drabing
- 17th - Sipka Berska

=== Scorecard ===
October 25, 1998 • Prague, Czech Republic Supplies by Wayne DeMila, IFBB Vice President, Pro Division Chairman
CONTESTANT, COUNTRY (in order of appearance)	RND 1	RND 2	RND 3	Pose Down	FINAL PLACE
Lesa Lewis, (United States)	16	20	25	23	5
Sipka Berska, (Serbia and Montenegro)	85	85	85		17
Eva Sukupova, (Czech Republic)	47	43	49		8
Yolanda Hughes, (United States)	15	11	10	11	2
Dayana Cadeau, (Canada)	67	68	70		14
Chris Bongiovanni, (United States)	51	49	47		9
Kim Chizevsky, (United States)	5	5	5	5	1
Laura Creavalle, (Guyana)	23	25	18	21	5
Andrulla Blanchette, (United Kingdom)	31	30	32	30	6
Valentina Chepiga, (Ukraine)	65	60	55		12
Jackie DeGennaro, (Belgium)	72	69	71		15
Yaxeni Oriquen-Garcia, (Venezuela)	54	47	46		10
Gayle Moher, (United States)	42	51	58		11
Vickie Gates, (United States)	18	14	17	14	3
Beate Drabling, (Austria)	77	76	69		16
Jitka Harizomova, (Czech Republic)	34	41	36		7
Zdenka Turda, (Czech Republic)	63	67	71		13

== See also ==
- 1998 Mr. Olympia
