= Nemesis 3: Prey Harder =

1996 science fiction film

- Promotional release poster
- Directed by: Albert Pyun
- Written by: Rebecca Charles; Albert Pyun
- Produced by: Tom Karnowski; Gary Schmoeller
- Starring: Sue Price; Tim Thomerson; Norbert Weisser; Xavier Declie; Sharon Bruneau
- Cinematography: George Mooradian
- Edited by: Ken Morrisey
- Music by: Anthony Riparetti
- Production companies: Filmwerks; Imperial Entertainment
- Distributed by: Imperial Entertainment Corporation; Warner Home Entertainment (US)
- Release dates: February 6, 1996 (Germany); June 18, 1996 (US)
- Running time: 85 minutes
- Countries: United States; Denmark
- Language: English

Nemesis 3: Prey Harder (also known as Nemesis 3 and Nemesis 3: Time Lapse) is a 1996 science fiction film directed and co-written by Albert Pyun. It is the sequel to Nemesis 2: Nebula (1995) and was followed by Nemesis 4: Death Angel (1996). It is the third installment in the Nemesis film series.

== Plot ==
Alex wakes up in the desert with a bullet in the back of her head and total amnesia. Following her footprints back the way she came, she encounters a man named Farnsworth 2, who offers to help her and get her medical attention. He gives her "a shot of endo" to repair the affected part of her brain and she starts to have flashes of memories; when she remembers a woman warning her not to let Farnsworth 2 get her DNA, she kills him with his own gun before he can complete a blood test on her. She then passes out and begins to remember.

After destroying Nebula and being rescued by soldiers, she accompanies the soldiers to a rocky area where the soldiers are wiped out by a surprise attack by a small group of insurgents before Alex takes them out herself. Her necklace starts glowing and a light appears in the distance from a time machine that landed (as seen in the previous film). Following the light source, she meets her half-sister Raine, who explains that she has 20 half-sisters but Alex is unique as she has the ability to procreate and start a new breed of genetically enhanced humans capable of wiping out the cyborg threat. She tells Alex that, because of their limited launch window, they must return in 24 hours or they will be stranded for one year. She then lets Alex make her escape before being captured by Farnsworth 2 and his team, who are disguised as rebel fighters.

Alex joins forces with Edson, a mercenary with dubious moral scruples, and Johnny, a former freedom fighter ("a big hero" according to Edson) who lost much of his higher mental functions after sustaining a head injury during rescue mission and was left for dead. Edson and Johnny are captured by the cyborgs and an accidentally-reactivated Nebula starts killing Farnsworth's men, claiming Alex as his bounty. Nebula shapeshifts into one of Alex's sisters shortly before Alex smashes her way into the cyborg's secret base at the disused mine, killing most of the remaining cyborgs and rescuing Raine, Edson, Johnny and her other "sister". Just as they make their escape however, Farnsworth 2 sends a drone after them that destroys the jeep.

Alex wakes up next to Farnsworth's jeep, remembering nothing after the explosion and having no idea what happened to Johnny, Edson, her sister or how she ended up in the desert with a bullet through her head. She comes to the conclusion that she "remembered all [she] could... the answers lie in the future. The future... where everything was waiting."

== Cast ==
- Sue Price as Alex
- Tim Thomerson as Farnsworth 2
- Norbert Weisser as Edson
- Xavier Declie as Johnny
- Sharon Bruneau as Lock
- Debbie Muggli as Ditko
- Ursula Sarcev as Ramie
- Earl White as Brick / Juma
  - Cinque Glendy as Young Juma
- Jon H. Epstein as Michael
- Chad Stahelski as Nebula
- Karen Studer as Zama
- Bobby Brown as Rebel #1 / Bob
- Jahi J.J. Zuri as Rebel #2
- Shelton Baily as Tribal Chief

== Release ==
Nemesis 3: Prey Harder was released direct-to-video.

== Sequel ==
A sequel titled Nemesis 4: Death Angel, was released in 1996.
