= Vimont =

Vimont can refer to:

Places

== Canada ==
- Vimont, Quebec, a district in Laval, Quebec, Canada
- Vimont (electoral district), an electoral district in Laval, Quebec, Canada
- Vimont (AMT), a commuter train station in Greater Montreal, Canada
- Vimont Lake, a water body of the unorganized territory Lac-Ashuapmushuan, Quebec, Canada

== France ==
- Vimont, Calvados, a commune in France

People

- Barthélemy Vimont, S.J. (1594-1667)
- Pierre Vimont (1949- )

== See also ==
- Guimond
