= Elena Shportun-Willemer =

Russian bodybuilder (born 1976)

- professional bodybuilder

Personal info
- Nickname: Russian Dynamo
- Born: 1976; Krasnoyarsk, Siberia-Russia

Best statistics
- Height: 5 ft 5 in (1.65 m)
- Weight: (In Season) 136-140 lb (Off-Season) 150-155 lb

Professional (Pro) career
- Best win: IFBB World Amateur Championships HW & Overall; 2007
- Predecessor: Claudia Partenza
- Successor: Alina Popa

Elena Shportun-Willemer (born 1976 in Krasnoyarsk, Siberia-Russia) is a professional female bodybuilder who mainly competes in European bodybuilding competitions. She is known in the bodybuilding world for her artistic style of posing which involves modern and belly dancing, classic lines and symmetry which are often compared with those from the female bodybuilders from the late 1970s and early 1980s such as Cory Everson and Anja Langer. Although Shportun-Willemer has had the opportunity to compete at the pro level she has opted to remain competitive as an amateur level and recently won the 2009 Arnold Amateur International Bodybuilding Championship.

== Biography ==
Shportun-Willemer was born in a city near Krasnoyarsk, Russia. At an early age she began to play a different types of sports. When she was seven, she started doing Artistic Gymnastics, and stopped after two years. Afterwards, her mother became her mentor and coached Shportun-Willemer in swimming and cross-country skiing. Later on at the age of 17 she continued her athletic lifestyle by doing karate. In 1995, at the age of nineteen, Shportun-Willemer began weight training when she visited a bodybuilding studio for the first time. Four years later she competed at an amateur bodybuilding competition for the first time; after her first experience competing in bodybuilding she decided that she needed to improve her performance on stage and began to take choreography and lessons in modern and belly dancing. This would later help her improve her posing routines on stage.

During the late 1990s and early 2000s (decade), Elena has had a very successful amateur career in her native Russia as well as Europe. She has won the All-Russian Championships (2002–03) and World Amateur Championships twice (2005 and 2007), and the European Championships (2005). Recently 2009, proved to be a very good year for Shportun-Willemer, having won the 2009 Arnold Amateur Classic Championships, Oslo Grand Prix, and the Loaded Cup. Despite having had the opportunity to turn pro after winning the 2007 World Amateur Championships, Shpoturn has opted to stay away from the pro events citing the fact that the professional female bodybuilders carry more muscle than what she wants to have and also does not want to discourage women from weight training.

Outside of the competitive stage Elena has a college degree from the Siberia-Aero Academy and worked as economist and lived for some time in Zheleznogorsk, Siberia until she moved to Germany after marrying her husband Claus Willemer, a freelance photographer. During her free time she enjoys writing poems, painting, and works as a make-up artist and costume designer.

== Vital stats ==
- Current residence: Germany, Hessen
- Occupation: bodybuilding competitor, personal trainer, fitness model.
- Height: 5 ft 5 in
- Weight (in season): 136–140 lb; (off-season): 150–160 lb
- Eye color: blue
- Hair color: blond

== Bodybuilding philosophy ==
Shportun-Willemer's training mainly consisted of a combination compound, and isolation exercises (mostly done with free weights and a small number of machines and cables). She trains with traditional philosophy focusing on the major muscle groups of her body and avoiding heavy weight training for her traps and forearms. She rarely does heavy Regular Squats with a free barbells due to avoid developing a thicker waist and focuses on Hack Squats, Leg Presses, and Lunges for her legs. Elena believes that proper form is very important and often avoids extreme heavy weights. During the off-season she avoided any form of aerobic exercise to preserve her energy levels. When it came to contest season she would do at least one or two cardio sessions for four to five days due to her high metabolism.

== Contest history ==
- 1997 FBFR Regional Fitness Championship of Krasnoyarsk
- 1999 FBFR Regional Bodybuilding and Fitness Championship of Krasnoyarsk 1st
- 1999 FBFR Siberian Bodybuilding Championship; 3rd
- 2000 FBFR Regional Bodybuilding Championship of Krasnoyarsk; 1st
- 2001 FBFR Regional Bodybuilding Championship of Krasnoyarsk; 1st
- 2001 FBFR International Russian Championship; 2nd (MW)
- 2001 FBFR Siberian Bodybuilding Championship; 3rd
- 2002 FBFR Regional Bodybuilding Championship of Krasnoyarsk; 1st (MW and overall)
- 2002 FBFR Russian Bodybuilding Cup; 1 (MW)
- 2002 FBFR International Russian Bodybuilding Championships; 1st (HW and overall)
- 2003 FBFR Russian Bodybuilding Cup; 1st (HW and overall)
- 2003 IFBB European Women's Bodybuilding Championships; 6th (HW)
- 2004 FBFR Russia Siberian Championship; 1st (HW and overall)
- 2004 FBFR Russian Bodybuilding Cup; 1st (HW and overall)
- 2004 FBFR International Russian Bodybuilding Championships; 1st (HW and overall)
- 2005 FBFR International Russian Bodybuilding Championships; 1st (HW and overall)
- 2005 IFBB European Women's Bodybuilding Championships; 1st (HW and overall)
- 2005 IFBB Spain Women's World Bodybuilding Championships; 2nd (HW)
- 2006 FBFR International Russian Bodybuilding Championships; 1st (HW and overall)
- 2006 IFBB Women's World Bodybuilding Championships; 1st (HW)
- 2007 IFBB Women's World Bodybuilding Championships; 1st (HW and overall)
- 2009 IFBB Arnold Amateur International Bodybuilding Championship; 1st (MW and overall)
- 2009 IFBB Oslo Grand Bodybuilding Prix; 1st (also won best poser)
- 2009 IFBB Loaded Bodybuilding Cup; 1st
- 2010 IFBB Ms. International; 9th
- 2011 IFBB Arnold Classic Europe Bodybuilding Championships; 1st
- 2011 NAC Universe; 2nd
- 2011 WABBA Universe; 1st (figure)
- 2011 NAC Universe; 4th

== See also ==
- List of female bodybuilders
- List of female fitness & figure competitors
