= Candice Carr-Archer =

Trinidad professional female bodybuilder

Candice Carr
- Professional bodybuilder

Personal info
- Born: June 9, 1972 (age 53); Trinidad

Best statistics
- Height: 5 ft 7 in (1.70 m)
- Weight: In Season: 150-155lb Off-Season: 170lb

Professional (Pro) career
- Pro-debut: IFBB Pro Bodybuilding Weekly Championships; 2010
- Best win: Central American Champions (CAC) Bodybuilding Championships; 2009

Candice Carr (born June 9, 1972) is a Trinidad professional female bodybuilder. She currently lives on the island of Trinidad.

== Career ==
Candice won her pro card in 2009 at Central American and Caribbean Championships in Grenada and is only the second woman from Trinidad and Tobago to earn her IFBB Pro Card. She has said that her goal is to qualify for the Ms. Olympia.

=== Contest history ===
- 1998 Junior National (Trinidad & Tobago) Bodybuilding Championships - 2nd
- 1999 Senior National (Trinidad & Tobago) Championships - 2nd
- 1999 Junior National (Trinidad & Tobago) Championships - 1st
- 2000 Senior National (Trinidad & Tobago) Championships - 3rd
- 2002 Central American Champions (CAC) Bodybuilding Championships - 3rd
- 2002 Senior National Bodybuilding Championships - 1st
- 2003 Eastern Caribbean Bodybuilding Championships - 1st
- 2006 Lawrence Marshall Annual Bodybuilding Championships - 1st
- 2006 Eastern Caribbean Bodybuilding Championships - 1st
- 2007 Senior National(Trinidad & Tobago) Bodybuilding Championships - 1st
- 2007 Eastern Caribbean Bodybuilding Championships - 1st
- 2009 Senior National (Trinidad & Tobago) Championships - 2nd
- 2009 25th World Bodybuilding & Fitness Championships - 14th (heavyweight)
- 2009 Central American Champions (CAC) Bodybuilding Championships, Grenada - 1st (overall and heavyweight)
- 2010 IFBB Pro Bodybuilding Weekly Championships (Tampa Pro) Women's Bodybuilding -14th
- 2011 IFBB Pro Bodybuilding Weekly Championships (Tampa Pro) Women's Bodybuilding - 17th
- 2011 IFBB Europa Battle of Champions Women's Bodybuilding - 14th
- 2018 IFBB Atlantic Coast Pro Women's Open Physique - 8th
- 2018 St. Louis Pro Masters Women's Physique - 1st
- 2018 St. Louis Pro Women's Open Physique - 4th
- 2018 Omaha Pro Women's Open Physique - 15th
- 2018 Legions Sports Festival Pro Women's Open Physique - 3rd
- 2019 Arnold Classic Pro Women's Open Physique - 8th
- 2019 St. Louis Pro Women's Open Physique - 5th
- 2019 Chicago Pro Women's Open Physique - 6th
- 2019 Legions Sports Festival Pro Women's Open Physique - 8th
- 2023 Pittsburgh Pro Women's Open Physique - 9th
- 2023 New York Pro Women's Open Physique - 7th
- 2023 Masters Olympia Women's Open Physique - 10th
- 2023 IFBB Masters World Championship 40+ 1st, 50+ 1st
- 2024 Toronto Pro Supershow Women's Open Physique 8th Place
- 2024 Atlantic Coast Pro Open - 4th Place
- 2024 Atlantic Coast Pro Masters 50+ - 1st Place
- 2025 Toronto Pro Supershow Women's Open Physique-7th Place
- 2025 Masters Olympia Women's Open Physique - 5th
