= 1996 Ms. Olympia =

Women's professional bodybuilding competition

- Promotion: IFBB
- Date: September 20, 1996
- City: Chicago, Illinois, United States

Event chronology
| 1995 Ms. Olympia | 1996 Ms. Olympia | 1997 Ms. Olympia |

The 1996 Ms. Olympia contest was an IFBB professional bodybuilding competition was held on September 20, 1996, in Chicago, Illinois. It was the 17th Ms. Olympia competition held.

== Prize money ==
- 1st - $50,000
- 2nd - $20,000
- 3rd - $10,000
- 4th - $7,000
- 5th - $5,000
- 6th - $3,500
- 7th - $3,000
- 8th - $2,500
- 9th - $2,000
- 10th - $1,500

Total: $104,500

== Rounds ==
- Round 1 (Symmetry Round): Judging the balance and proportion of contestants' physiques.
- Round 2 (Muscularity/Conditioning Round): Focused on muscle size, definition, and conditioning.
- Round 3 (Compulsory Poses Round): Contestants performed specific mandatory poses to highlight their physiques.
- Round 4 (Posing Routine Round): A choreographed posing routine to music, emphasizing presentation and artistic expression.

== Results ==
=== Scorecard ===
| CONTESTANT, COUNTRY (IN ORDER OF APPEARANCE) | ROUND 1 | ROUND 2 | ROUND 3 | POSE DOWN | FINAL PLACE |
|---|---|---|---|---|---|
| BEATRIX GLUCK, (Germany) GERMANY | 60 | 60 | 60 | | 12 |
| SUE MYERS, USA | 50 | 50 | 45 | | 10 |
| MELISSA COATES, (Canada) CANADA | 40 | 45 | 49 | | 9 |
| LENDA MURRAY, USA | 5 | 13 | 10 | 10 | 2 |
| EVA SUKUPOVA, (Czech Republic) CZECH REPUBLIC | 37 | 36 | 39 | | 7 |
| KIM CHIZEVSKY, USA | 12 | 5 | 5 | 5 | 1 |
| JOANNE LEE, (England) ENGLAND | 51 | 54 | 54 | | 11 |
| VICKY GATES, USA | 21 | 26 | 27 | 25 | 5 |
| LAURA CREAVALLE, (Granada) GRANADA/USA | 16 | 20 | 20 | 20 | 4 |
| NATALIA MURNIKOVIENE, (Lithuania) LITHUANIA | 24 | 12 | 14 | 13 | 3 |
| NANCY LEWIS, USA | 26 | 32 | 30 | 30 | 6 |
| ANDRULLA BLANCHETTE, (England) ENGLAND | 46 | 36 | 36 | | 8 |

== See also ==
- 1996 Mr. Olympia
