= Nemesis 4: Death Angel =

1996 science fiction film

- Official DVD cover
- Directed by: Albert Pyun
- Written by: Albert Pyun
- Produced by: Tom Karnowski; Gary Schmoeller
- Starring: Sue Price; Blanka Copikova; Andrew Divoff; Michal Gucík; Nicholas Guest
- Cinematography: George Mooradian
- Edited by: Ken Morrisey
- Music by: Anthony Riparetti
- Production companies: Filmwerks; Imperial Entertainment
- Distributed by: Imperial Entertainment Corporation
- Release dates: December 23, 1996 (Germany); April 25, 1997 (Japan); April 27, 1999 (U.S.)
- Running time: 80 minutes
- Countries: United States; Denmark
- Language: English

Nemesis 4: Death Angel (also known as Nemesis 4 and Cry of Angels: Nemesis 4) is a 1996 science fiction film written and directed by Albert Pyun, who also directed the previous installments in the series. Sue Price reprises her role as Alex Sinclair and appears mostly nude for much of the film. Nemesis 4: Death Angel was shot at the same time as Nemesis 3: Prey Harder, and was the most violent in the entire Nemesis series to date. A sequel to Nemesis 3: Prey Harder (1996) and it is the fourth installment in the Nemesis film series. In 2017, it was followed by Nemesis 5: The New Model, directed by Dustin Ferguson.

== Plot ==
Following an uneasy ceasefire between humans and cyborgs, Alex Sinclair (Sue Price) makes a living in the future as a cybernetically-enhanced assassin for her boss, Bernardo (Andrew Divoff). However, when Alex accidentally targets the wrong man and kills the son of a major crime syndicate leader, she finds herself on the run again as every assassin in town comes to collect the bounty on her. Meanwhile, Alex has been seeing a woman in black watching her from a distance, leading her to believe that the Angel of Death is waiting to come for her.

== Cast ==
- Sue Price as Alex Sinclair
- Blanka Copikova as Woman In Black
- Andrew Divoff as Bernardo
- Michal Gucík as Priest
- Nicholas Guest as Earl Typhoon
- Andrej Lehota as Thug
- Hracko Pavol as Thug
- Simon Poland as Johnny Impact
- Juro Rasla as Carlos Jr.
- Norbert Weisser as Tokuda

== Sequel ==
A sequel titled Nemesis 5: The New Model, was released in 2017.
