= Kim Chizevsky-Nicholls =

American bodybuilder (born 1968)

- Professional bodybuilder

Personal info
- Nickname: Sunflower
- Born: April 23, 1968 (age 58); Charleston, Illinois, U.S.

Best statistics
- Height: 5 ft 8 in (1.73 m)
- Weight: (On season): 121–165 lb (55–75 kg) (Off season): 180 lb (82 kg)

Professional (Pro) career
- Pro-debut: Ms. International; 1993
- Best win: Ms. Olympia; 1996, 1997, 1998 and 1999
- Predecessor: Lenda Murray
- Successor: Juliette Bergmann
- Active: Retired 1999 (bodybuilding); Retired 2002 (fitness); Retired 2004 (figure)

Kimberly "Kim" Ann Chizevsky-Nicholls (born April 23, 1968) is an American professional female bodybuilding champion, fitness, and figure competitor.

== Early life and education ==
Kim Chizevsky was born in 1968 in Charleston, Illinois, the elder of two children. In 1970, the family moved and raised her in Decatur. While attending the E.J. Muffley Elementary School, she engaged in sports such as basketball, volleyball and cheerleading. While attending the Eisenhower High School, she was a multi-sport star there. In addition to participating in volleyball, basketball, and cheerleading, she ran the 100, 400, 800 relay, and mile relay, threw the shot and discus, and did the long jump. Upon graduation from high school in 1986, she then attended Southern Illinois University for three years, where she studied legal and medical secretarial services and worked as a paralegal with the law firm Baird, McCarthy and Rowden. While in college, she joined the dance squad and participated in aerobics.

== Bodybuilding career ==
=== Amateur ===
In 1988, she began dating Chad Nicholls, a bodybuilder who directed her away from being an aerobics instructor and towards bodybuilding, along with becoming her coach and later husband. After three months under his instructions, Chizevsky-Nicholls, weighing 121 pounds (55 kg) at 5 ft 8 in (1.73 m), placed second in the lightheavyweight class in the 1989 NPC Jr. Tri State. With the exception of the 1989 NPC Jr. Tri State and 1989 AAU Central USA, Chizevsky-Nicholls would place 1st in every amateur bodybuilding competition she attended. Chizevsky-Nicholls earned her pro card by winning the 1992 IFBB North American Championship, competing at 147 pounds (67 kg).

=== Professional ===
==== 1993–1995 ====
In her 1993 pro debut, Chizevsky-Nicholls attended her first pro competition, the Ms. International, which she won. In November 1993, she attended her first Ms. Olympia, where she placed fifth. At the 1994 Ms. International, she placed fifth. In 1995, she placed second at the Ms. International and Ms. Olympia.

==== 1996–1999 ====
In 1996, Chizevsky-Nicholls won the Ms. International and dethroned the Ms. International champion, Laura Creavalle. Also in 1996, she unseated six-time Ms. Olympia defending champion, Lenda Murray. This was the first time a pro female bodybuilder won both the Ms. International and Ms. Olympia in the same year. She retained her Ms. Olympia title in 1997 against Lenda Murry, who retired afterwards. At the 1997 Ms. Olympia, she competed at 157 pounds (71 kg). In 1998 and 1999, she won both Ms. Olympia competitions.

=== Retirement ===
Chizevsky-Nicholls decided to retire from bodybuilding after winning the 1999 Ms. Olympia.

=== Legacy ===
Chizevsky-Nicholls was the first female bodybuilder to win both the Ms. International and Olympia in the same year in 1996. She ranks as the best female bodybuilder in the IFBB Pro Women's Bodybuilding Ranking List until October 22, 2000. In January 2008, Chizevsky was inducted into the IFBB Hall of Fame.

=== Competition history ===
- 1989 Tri-State Bodybuilding (Illinois) – 2nd (LHW)
- 1989 AAU Illinois – 1st (Tall)
- 1989 AAU Central USA – 2nd (Tall)
- 1990 NPC Tri-State – 1st (HW)
- 1990 AAU Southern Illinois – 1st (Tall)
- 1990 AAU Illinois – 1st (Overall)
- 1990 AAU Central USA – 1st (Overall)
- 1991 NPC Continental USA – 1st (Overall)
- 1991 MPC Midwest Grand Prix – 1st (Overall)
- 1992 NPC Junior Nationals – 1st (HW and overall)
- 1992 IFBB North American Championship – 1st (HW and overall)
- 1993 IFBB Ms. International – 1st
- 1993 IFBB Ms. Olympia – 5th
- 1994 IFBB Ms. International – 5th
- 1995 IFBB Ms. International – 2nd
- 1995 IFBB Ms. Olympia – 2nd
- 1996 IFBB Ms. International – 1st
- 1996 IFBB Ms. Olympia – 1st
- 1997 IFBB Ms. Olympia – 1st
- 1998 IFBB Ms. Olympia – 1st
- 1999 IFBB Ms. Olympia – 1st

=== Best statistics ===
- Biceps – 16 1/2 inches (42 cm)
- Chest – 46 inches (120 cm)
- Height – 5 ft 8 in (173 cm)
- On season weight - 121–165 lb (55–75 kg)
- Quads – 28 inches (71 cm)

== Fitness career ==
Chizevsky-Nicholls gave up much of her muscle gains and began competing in fitness competitions in 2001, but with only limited success.

=== Contest history ===
- 2001 IFBB Fitness International – 6th
- 2002 Southwest Pro Fitness – 4th

== Figure career ==
Five months after giving birth to her first son, Chizevsky-Nicholls began competing in figure, but again with only limited success.

=== Contest history ===
- 2003 IFBB Show of Strength Pro Championship – 9th
- 2004 IFBB Show of Strength Pro Championship – 7th

== Personal life ==
In May 1993, Kim Chizevsky-Nicholls married Chad Nicholls, a former bodybuilder, drug and nutrition guru and coach for his wife, along with professional bodybuilders Ronnie Coleman and Lenda Murray. They currently live in Springfield, Missouri and have two children, Dominic and Morgan Nicholls.

=== Television appearance ===
In July 1995, Chizevsky-Nicholls appeared on Geraldo, along with Bill Dobbins, Lenda Murray, Debbie Muggli, Sharon Bruneau, Debbie Kruck, Sha-ri Pendleton, and Nikki Fuller.

The 2000 documentary Bodybuilders dealing with female bodybuilding and specifically concentrates on Ms. Olympia and the rapid changes that happened to the sport from 1980 to 2000, with Kim Chizevsky-Nicholls being featured and interviewed in the film.

=== Motion picture appearance ===
In 2000, Chizevsky-Nicholls appeared in The Cell, which starred Jennifer Lopez. According to director Tarsem Singh's DVD audio commentary, the character she played was originally listed in the script simply as "helper", so Tarsem asked the production designer what disturbs him. So, he replied that “Those women that work out,” so he added her. Tarsem was concerned the audience might think she was a man in drag, so they gave her prosthetic breasts.

== Notes ==
Ms. Olympia
Preceded by: Lenda Murray	First (1996)	Succeeded by: Herself
Preceded by: Herself	Second (1997)	Succeeded by: Herself
Preceded by: Herself	Third (1998)	Succeeded by: Herself
Preceded by: Herself	Fourth (1999)	Succeeded by: Juliette Bergmann

Ms. International
Preceded by: Anja Schreiner	First (1993)	Succeeded by: Laura Creavalle
Preceded by: Laura Creavalle	Second (1996)	Succeeded by: Yolanda Hughes
