= Fabiola Boulanger =

French Canadian professional female bodybuilder

- professional bodybuilder

Personal info
- Born: August 10, 1978 (age 46); Repentigny, Quebec

Best statistics
- Height: 5 ft 3 in (1.60 m)
- Weight: (In Season): 149 lb (Off-Season):167 lb

Professional (Pro) career
- Pro-debut: Pro Gym Cup; 1999
- Best win: CBBF Canadian Nationals; 2011
- Predecessor: Sandra McLeod
- Successor: Joanne Williams
- Active: Retired 2013

Fabiola Boulanger (born August 10, 1978) is a French Canadian professional female bodybuilder born and raised in Repentigny, Quebec.

== Personal life ==
In addition to bodybuilding, she is an orthotherapist and a private trainer. Boulanger's first language is French.

== Bodybuilding career ==
After winning the 2011 CBBF Canadian Nationals, Boulanger was awarded her IFBB pro card, but in 2013, she announced her retirement from bodybuilding. That same year, she participated in the Toronto Pro as a physique competitor.

=== Contest history ===
- 1999 - Pro Gym Cup - 1st
- 2009 - Quebec de l'Ouest Championships - 1st
- 2009 - Provincial Championships - 1st
- 2010 – CBBF Canadian Nationals - 2nd
- 2011 – CBBF Canadian Nationals - 1st
