= Geraldine Morgan =

Chilean bodybuilder

- professional bodybuilder

Personal info
- Nickname: Vikinga
- Born: July 22, 1977 (age 47)

Best statistics
- Height: 5 ft 6 in (1.68 m)
- Weight: (In Season):73 kg (Off-Season):79 kg

Professional (Pro) career
- Pro-debut: IFBB Ms. International; 2012
- Best win: IFBB Olympia Amateur & International Cup; 2011

Geraldine Morgan (born July 22, 1977) is a Chilean professional female bodybuilder.

== Contest history ==
- 1998 National Fitness (Santiago, Chile)
- 1999 National Fitness (Viña del Mar, Chile)
- 2006 National Fitness Championship (Santiago, Chile)
- 2006 Fitness America Pageant (Hollywood, CA, US)
- 2008 IFBB Bodybuilding National Championship Copa Body Shop (Los Andes, Chile)
- 2008 IFBB South America Amateur Championship - 4th (HW) (São Paulo, Brazil)
- 2008 IFBB World Amateur Championships Santa Susana - 10th (HW) (Barcelona, Spain)
- 2009 IFBB World Amateur Championships - 13th (HW) (Como, Italy)
- 2009 IFBB Arnold Classic Amateur - 3rd (HW) (Columbus, OH, US)
- 2010 Musclemania America - 5th
- 2011 IFBB Arnold Classic Amateur - 2nd (HW) (Columbus, OH, US)
- 2011 IFBB Olympia Amateur & International Cup - 1st (London, England)
- 2012 IFBB Ms. International - 14th (Columbus, OH, US)
- 2013 IFBB Pro Bodybuilding Weekly Championships - 16th (Tampa, FL, US)
- 2016 IFBB Arctic Pro- 3rd (Alaska, US)
