= Sue Gafner =

American bodybuilder (born 1964)

- Professional bodybuilder

Personal info
- Born: 1964 (age 61–62); Erie, Pennsylvania, U.S.

Best statistics
- Height: 5 ft 2 1/2 in (159 cm)
- Weight: 105–128 lb (48–58 kg) (in season); 118–138 lb (54–63 kg) (off-season)

Professional (Pro) career
- Pro-debut: IFBB Ms. International; 1991
- Best win: IFBB Jan Tana Classic champion; 1991
- Predecessor: None
- Successor: Nikki Fuller
- Active: Retired 1993

Sue Gafner (born 1964) is an American former professional female bodybuilder of the late 1980s and early 1990s.

Gafner competed as an amateur in the to the light-weight competitive division for several years in the late 80s until she moved to the middle weight class at the national class level of competitive bodybuilding in the early 90s.

Gafner earned her professional card in 1990 by winning the middle weight class at the NPC Nationals. She competed as a professional from 1991 through 1993. She was the first winner of the Jan Tana Classic in 1991. As of 2008, she resides in the Tampa / St. Petersburg area of Florida where she lives with her husband while working as an independent management consultant specializing in financial compliance.

== Biography ==
Sue Gafner was born in 1964 in Erie, Pennsylvania. When she was young, her family moved to Albuquerque, New Mexico where she grew up, and eventually moved to Southern California where she settled with her family in Orange, California. At the age of 23, she was introduced to weight training through the book Hard Bodies by Gladys Portugues and began to lift at a local gym (Brainum, 166). She took up weight training mainly to lose weight.

During this time, weight training was becoming more popular with women and soon Gafner became very interested in it along with better nutritional practices. Her body responded quickly and before she knew it she got hooked on the bodybuilding life style. During this time, she began following a stricter diet and soon began to think about competition. Gafner gathered her training knowledge from a variety of sources, including Hard Bodies, and received guidance from some of the members at her gym who offered her tips on training and dieting.

She finally decided to compete after three months of training. In April 1987, she entered her first contest. She won her class at the 1987 Palm Springs Muscle Classic Novice contest, and followed her debut with a victory at the 1987 Tournament of Champions where she won both her class and became the overall champion. She continued training, but ran into trouble due to her lack of knowledge about dieting and exercise and often overtrained (Brainum, 223).

This soon changed when Gafner joined up with a more experienced bodybuilder, Lisa Hitchens. Hitchens taught Gafner how to train properly. Hitchen's advice was very helpful and it showed in Gafner's competition. Gafner placed 1st in the light weight division at the 1988 USA Championships and 2nd in the 1989 NPC Nationals. Gafner later decided to enter the middle weight class and placed 1st at the NPC Nationals, earning her Professional card in only a three-year period. She continued to compete; meanwhile, she managed her own wall-papering business and worked as a wall-paper hanger.

After becoming a pro, Gafner had a brief career on the pro circuit. She arrived at a time when Women's Bodybuilding was going through a transition where bigger was better. And like many women bodybuilders of the 1980s, she refused to follow with the trend of gaining large levels of muscle mass in order to compete and be successful in the sport were once small frames were considered better.

While she was very successful at the NPC level where she placed no lower than 2nd, she soon found herself lost at the IFBB where heavier athletes were winning the shows. She placed 10th at her first Ms. Olympia competition, and 12th the second time, and after reaching the top-five at her second 1993 Ms. International, she retired from the sport entirely. This came as a result of her lack of desire to use large amounts of steroids such as growth hormones in order to compete and be successful at a pro level. Today, it is believed that like many other professional bodybuilders, Gafner started her own personal training business and is living peacefully in California.

Gafner stands out from other female professional bodybuilders for being a great promotor of the bodybuilding lifestyle and for always promoting the benefits of bodybuilding outside of competing. "Bodybuilding has allowed me mold my body into the shape I want, that's why I do it, and will continue to train regardless of whether I compete or not. Bodybuilding makes me feel good about myself, and that's what's important" (Brainum, 226). Gafner's only IFBB Pro, and most notable victory was the IFBB 1991 Jan Tana Classic.

== Vital stats ==
- Current residence: Florida
- Occupation: bodybuilding competitor, personal trainer, fitness model, wallpaper hanger.
- Height: 5 ft 2 1/2 in
- Weight (in season): 108–120 lb; (off-season): 115–121 lb
- Eye color: green
- Hair color: red

== Bodybuilding philosophy ==
Gafner's training mainly consisted of a combination compound, and isolation exercises (mostly done with free weights and a small number of machines and cables). She trained with the traditional push and pull routine (three days on, one day off) and when contest preparations started, she switched to a four days on / one day off routine to focus more on different body parts. Gafner focuses on her chest, shoulders, back, and arms in order to bring up her upper body to match her strong legs (Brainum, 224). She rarely does Regular Squats with a free barbells due to a hip problem and focuses more on isolation exercises such as Hack Squats, Leg Presses, and Lunges (Brainum, 224). Gafner believes that proper form is very important and often avoids extreme heavy weights. During the off-season, she avoided any form of aerobic exercise to preserve her energy levels. When it came to contest season, she would do at least one or two cardio sessions for four to five days due to her high metabolism.

== Contest history ==
- 1987 NPC Palm Springs Muscle Classic Novice - 1st (LW)
- 1987 NPC Tournament of Champions - 1st (LW and overall)
- 1988 NPC California State Championships - 2nd (LW)
- 1988 NPC USA Championships - 1st (LW)
- 1989 NPC Nationals - 2nd (LW)
- 1990 NPC Nationals - 1st (MW)
- 1990 IFBB World Amateur Championships - 2nd (MW)
- 1991 IFBB Ms. International - 6th
- 1991 IFBB Jan Tana Classic - 1st
- 1991 IFBB Ms. Olympia - 10th
- 1992 IFBB Ms. Olympia - 12th
- 1993 IFBB Ms. International - 4th

== See also ==
- List of female bodybuilders

== Notes ==
- Brainum, Jerry. Drug-free Light Weight Champ. California: Muscle & Fitness. June, 1989. ISSN 0744-5105. (Woodland Hills, California: I, Brute Enterprises inc., 1989.) Women Section: pages 164–166, 223–224, and 226 cover Sue Gafner's article.
- Fitness, Johnny. Kim's Columbus. Nebraska: Robert Kennedy's Muscle Mag International. August, 1993. UPSPS 4601. (Lincoln, Nebraska: Canusa Products/Foote & Davies, 1993.) Contest News Section: pages 78, and 80 covers about Sue Gafner competing at the 1993 Ms. International.
