= Colette Guimond =

French Canadian IFBB female bodybuilder

- Professional bodybuilder

Personal info
- Born: September 14, 1961 (age 64); Montreal, Quebec, Canada

Best statistics
- Height: 5 ft 1 in (1.55 m)
- Weight: In Season: 146-150 lb Off-Season: 160-175 lb

Professional (Pro) career
- Pro-debut: Europa Super Show; 2005

Colette Guimond (born September 14, 1961) is a French Canadian professional IFBB female bodybuilder. She lives in New Port Richey, Florida.

== Career ==
Guimond started training at the age of 26. After only two years in the weight room, she won the 1989 Montreal Championship. She had a very long hiatus in competitive bodybuilding due to a car accident in 1997. In 2005, Guimond took 1st place in the Canadian Women's Bodybuilding Nationals Heavyweight and earned her IFBB pro card.

== Contest history ==
- 1995 NPC Steel Rose - 1st (LW and overall)
- 2003 NPC Jan Tana Amateur - 1st (HW)
- 2003 NPC Southern States - 1st (HW)
- 2005 CBBF Canadian Championships - 1st (HW)
- 2005 IFBB Europa Super Show - 8th (HW)
- 2012 IFBB PBW Tampa Pro - 16th

== Measurements ==
- Biceps: 19 inches (48.2 cm)
- Chest: 46 inches (116.8 cm)
