= Lenda Murray =

American bodybuilder (born 1962)

- ♀ Professional bodybuilder

Personal info
- Nickname: Female Haney
- Born: February 22, 1962 (age 64); Detroit, Michigan, U.S.

Best statistics
- Biceps: 16 inches (41 cm)
- Chest: 39 inches (99 cm)
- Contest weight: 151 1/2–153 lb (68.7–69.4 kg)
- Height: 5 ft 5 in (165 cm)
- Off-season weight: 158–164 lb (72–74 kg)

Professional (Pro) career
- Pro-debut: International Federation of Bodybuilders Pro Division (IFBB) Ms. Olympia; 1990
- Best wins: IFBB Ms. Olympia; 1990–1995 & 2002–2003
- Predecessors: Corinna Everson; Juliette Bergmann
- Successors: Kim Chizevsky-Nicholls; Iris Kyle
- Pro years: 1990–1997 & 2002–2004
- Coaches: Ron Love (1984–1989); Chad Nicholls (2002–2004)
Medal record
Ms. Olympia
| 1st | 1990 Ms. Olympia | Open |
| 1st | 1991 Ms. Olympia | Open |
| 1st | 1992 Ms. Olympia | Open |
| 1st | 1993 Ms. Olympia | Open |
| 1st | 1994 Ms. Olympia | Open |
| 1st | 1995 Ms. Olympia | Open |
| 2nd | 1996 Ms. Olympia | Open |
| 2nd | 1997 Ms. Olympia | Open |
| 1st | 2002 Ms. Olympia | Overall & Heavyweight (HW) |
| 1st | 2003 Ms. Olympia | Overall & HW |
| 2nd | 2004 Ms. Olympia | HW |

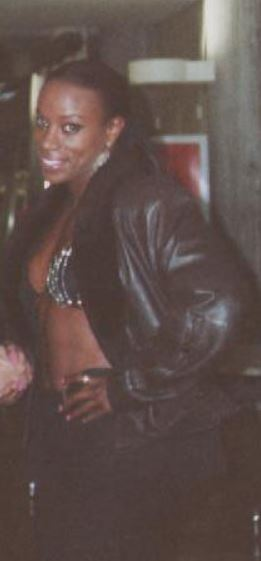

Lenda Murray (born 22 February 1962) is an American professional female bodybuilding champion.

== Early life and education ==
Murray was born in 1962 in Detroit, Michigan, the daughter of Darcelious and Louvelle Murray. She began participating in organized sports at the age of 15. At Henry Ford High School, Murray was both a record-holding sprinter and varsity cheerleader. She went on to attend Western Michigan University, earning a degree in political science and intended to become a lawyer. While at Western Michigan, she continued to cheerlead, and became the second African American to be chosen as the university’s homecoming queen in 1982.

After a brief tenure cheerleading for the Michigan Panthers in the now-defunct United States Football League, she worked with the Michigan Panthers for two years and then was invited to try out for the Dallas Cowboys cheerleaders. After she auditioned for the group and made the next-to-last cut, she decided she might need to slenderize her thighs a bit.

== Bodybuilding career ==
=== Amateur career ===
In 1984, Murray joined a gym, the Powerhouse Gym, in Highland Park, Michigan. Within the first two days of joining the gym, Ron Love, an NPC Nationals contender told her that she had the physique to be a bodybuilder. After about a year of training to just stay in shape, Murray decided to compete in the 1985 Ms. Michigan Championships. After placing fourth, she was hooked on the sport. Murray's father did not show up for her first bodybuilding competition, but eventually did for others. She rose quickly through the ranks, soon winning contests at the state and regional levels. In 1989, Murray earned her professional status at the IFBB North American Championships.

=== Professional career ===
==== 1990–1997 ====
Murray soon became a regular presence in bodybuilding magazines and a favorite subject of photographer Bill Dobbins who focused extensively on her in his books The Women and Modern Amazons. At the 1990 Ms. Olympia, Murray succeeded six-time champion Cory Everson and defeated Bev Francis to become the Ms. Olympia champion, a title Murray would hold for six years from 1990 to 1995. She appeared in such mass-market publications as Sports Illustrated, Ebony, Mademoiselle, and Vanity Fair, as well as in Annie Leibovitz’s photo essay Women. Murray’s physique became the standard against which professional female bodybuilders are now judged—an hourglass figure, with broad shoulders tapering into a V-shaped torso mirrored by a proportionally-developed lower body. At the 1991 Ms. Olympia, Murray won the slimmest margin of victory for any Ms. Olympia, edging out Bev Francis by a final score of 31 to 32. Afterwards, she would go on to win the Ms. Olympia competition in 1992, 1993, 1994, and 1995.

==== First retirement ====
Murray lost the Ms. Olympia title to Kim Chizevsky-Nicholls in 1996, and went into retirement after finishing second to Chizevsky-Nicholls again in December 1997.

==== 2002–2004 ====
Lenda, after Lonnie Teper left a voice message telling her to compete again, started thinking of coming out of retirement. She thought she could beat Juliette Bergman and thought it was a sign when they chose Juliette over Iris Kyle in 2001. After four years of retirement, Lenda returned to the Ms. Olympia stage, and won two more Ms. Olympia titles in 2002 and 2003. Her coach was Chad Nicholls, a former bodybuilder, drug and nutrition guru and coach for his wife, Kim Chizevsky-Nicholls, along with professional bodybuilder Ronnie Coleman.

==== Second retirement ====
Murray finished second in the heavyweight class to Iris Kyle in 2004, and again retired from competition.

==== Legacy ====
Murray has won eight overall Ms. Olympia titles and has two professional wins in her weight class. She is the second most successful female bodybuilder ever, second only to Iris Kyle. From February 28, 2003 to May 31, 2003, she ranked 1st on the IFBB Women's Bodybuilding Professional Ranking List.

Murray has previously done commentary for bodybuilding events on ESPN from 1993 to 1996. She was inducted into the IFBB Hall of Fame in 2010 and the International Sports Hall of Fame in 2015. In March 2011, she became a member of the National Fitness Hall of Fame and received the award from Arnold Schwarzenegger. Every year there is an NPC competition, held at Norfolk State University, called the Lenda Murray Bodybuilding, Figure and Bikini Championships, which she is a promoter and organizer for.

Murray is also spokesperson for Wings of Strength and she owns a nutritional products company Crystal Planet Nutrition.

=== Competition history ===
- 1985 NPC Michigan State - 4th
- 1985 NPC Eastern Michigan - 1st
- 1986 NPC Michigan - 3rd
- 1986 NPC Ironwoman Michigan - 3rd
- 1987 NPC Michigan - 3rd
- 1987 NPC North Coast - 2nd
- 1988 NPC Michigan - 1st
- 1989 NPC Junior Nationals - 1st (HW and overall)
- 1989 IFBB North American Championships - 1st (HW and overall)
- 1990 IFBB Ms. Olympia - 1st
- 1991 IFBB Ms. Olympia - 1st
- 1992 IFBB Ms. Olympia - 1st
- 1993 IFBB Ms. Olympia - 1st
- 1994 IFBB Ms. Olympia - 1st
- 1995 IFBB Ms. Olympia - 1st
- 1996 IFBB Ms. Olympia - 2nd
- 1997 IFBB Ms. Olympia - 2nd
- 2002 IFBB Ms. Olympia - 1st (HW and overall)
- 2003 IFBB Ms. Olympia - 1st (HW and overall)
- 2004 IFBB Ms. Olympia - 2nd (HW)

=== Best statistics ===
- Biceps - 16 inches (41 cm)
- Chest - 39 inches (99 cm)
- Height - 5 ft 7 in (170 cm)
- On season weight - 151 1/2–153 lb (68.7–69.4 kg)

== Personal life ==
As of 2013 Murray is married and lives in Playa Del Rey, California. She is a Christian. She is a grandmother of eleven and a stepmother of four.

Murray has done many videos to help others in their pursuit of fitness, been a professional cheerleader, a physical fitness trainer, a private trainer to professional wrestlers, athletes and others, along with trying out to become a professional wrestler for the World Wrestling Federation in 1997. In November 1990, she founded Lenda Murray Inc. From June 1999 to November 2004, she oversaw the daily operations, administrative and financial activities of The Fitness Firm. From 1999 to 2005, Murray owned a gym in Virginia Beach, Virginia called The Fitness Firm.

=== Television appearances ===
Murray has appeared on daytime talk shows like Geraldo, The Montel Williams Show, and The Jerry Springer Show.

Murray also done an interview for the Killer Sally 3 part series, highlighting the rise of female bodybuilding in the 80s and 90s.

=== Movie appearances ===
In 2015, Murray appeared in Adam Sandler's The Ridiculous 6 where she played (Terry Crews's character) Chico's mother.

== See also ==
- Andrea Shaw

== Sources ==
- Todd, Jan, "Lenda Murray", St. James Encyclopedia of Pop Culture, Gale Group, 1999

Ms. Olympia
| Preceded by Cory Everson | First; 1990 | Succeeded by Herself |
| Preceded by Herself | Second; 1991 | Succeeded by Herself |
| Preceded by Herself | Third; 1992 | Succeeded by Herself |
| Preceded by Herself | Fourth; 1993 | Succeeded by Herself |
| Preceded by Herself | Fifth; 1994 | Succeeded by Herself |
| Preceded by Herself | Sixth; 1995 | Succeeded by Kim Chizevsky-Nicholls |
| Preceded by Juliette Bergmann | Seventh; 2002 | Succeeded by Herself |
| Preceded by Herself | Eighth; 2003 | Succeeded by Iris Kyle |
