= Lora Ottenad =

American professional female bodybuilder

- ♀ Professional bodybuilder

Personal info
- Nickname: Washington Monument
- Born: February 3, 1964 (age 62); Seattle, Washington, U.S.

Best statistics
- Height: 5 ft 8 in (1.73 m)
- Weight: On season: 160–190 lb (73–86 kg)

Professional (Pro) career
- Pro-debut: International Federation of Bodybuilding and Fitness Professional League Ms. International; 2007
- Active: Since 1987

Lora Ottenad (born February 3, 1964) is an American professional bodybuilder and powerlifting champion from Las Vegas, Nevada.

== Bodybuilding career ==
=== Amateur ===
At the 2000 National Physique Committee (NPC) Nationals, according to Gene Hwang, "From the looks of the prejudging though, it was almost a consensus that Ottenad was going to take the class,". However, when the final results were read out, Heather Foster had beat Lora for the 1st place heavyweight title. The audience erupted with boos of displeasure over this. Lora stormed off the stage after the photographs and Sheliah Browne tried and failed to catch up to her to give her the trophy she left on stage. A camera crew surrounded the heavyweight top five quickly, but as Lora was leaving, she was visibly angered and many in the crowd were equally dumbfounded. At the 2006 NPC Nationals, Lora got 1st place in the heavyweight class at 170 lb (77 kg), the heaviest heavyweight class winner since Nicole Bass in 1997, along with winning the overall and her International Federation of Bodybuilding and Fitness Professional League card.

=== Contest history ===
- 1991 Seattle - 1st (Heavyweight (HW) & Overall (OA))
- 1992 Washington State Championship - 1st (HW)
- 1995 Western Washington - 1st (HW & OA)
- 1996 NPC Emerald Cup - 1st (HW)
- 1996 National Physique Committee (NPC) USA Championship - 11th (HW)
- 1996 NPC Nationals - Did not place (HW)
- 1997 NPC Emerald Cup - 1st (HW)
- 1999 NPC Iron Maiden Championships - 1st (HW & OA)
- 2000 NPC USA Championship - 1st (HW)
- 2000 NPC Nationals - 2nd (HW)
- 2001 NPC USA Championship - 9th (HW)
- 2003 NPC USA Championship - 4th (HW)
- 2003 NPC Nationals - 3rd (HW)
- 2004 NPC Nationals - 2nd (HW)
- 2005 NPC Nationals - 5th (HW)
- 2006 International Federation of BodyBuilding and Fitness (IFBB) North American - 2nd (HW)
- 2006 NPC Nationals - 1st (HW & OA)
- 2007 International Federation of Bodybuilding and Fitness Professional League (IFBB Pro League) Ms. International - 11th
- 2007 IFBB Pro League Atlantic City Pro - 4th (HW)
- 2009 IFBB Pro League Atlantic City Pro - 12th
- 2011 IFBB Pro League Europa Battle of Champions - 6th
- 2011 IFBB Pro League Pro Bodybuilding Weekly Championships - 12th
- 2013 IFBB Pro League Pro Bodybuilding Weekly Championships - 8th
- 2015 IFBB Pro League Wings of Strength Chicago Pro-Am Extravaganza - 9th (OA) & 5th (Masters)
- 2016 IFBB Pro League Lenda Murray Pro AM - 2nd
- 2016 IFBB Pro League Wings of Strength Rising Phoenix World Championships – 15th

=== Best statistics ===
- Bench press - 315 lb (143 kg) x 5 reps (best lifts at a body weight of 188 lb (85 kg))
- Biceps - 16.5 inches (42 cm)
- Calves - 17 inches (43 cm)
- Chest - 45 inches (110 cm)
- Legs - 25 inches (64 cm)
- Leg press - 1,800 lb (820 kg) (best lifts at a body weight of 188 lb (85 kg))
- On season weight:
  - 169 lb (77 kg) (1996 NPC Nationals)
  - 169 lb (77 kg) (2000 NPC USA)
  - 170 lb (77 kg) (2000 NPC Nationals)
  - 160 lb (73 kg) (January 15, 2002)
  - 175 lb (79 kg) (May 7, 2002)
  - 189 lb (86 kg) (March 24, 2003)
  - 170–170.75 lb (77.11–77.45 kg) (2003 NPC Nationals)
  - 189 lb (86 kg) (November 11, 2003)
  - 190 lb (86 kg) (May 12, 2004)
  - 172 lb (78 kg) (2004 NPC Nationals)
  - 169 lb (77 kg) (2005 NPC Nationals)
  - 170 lb (77 kg) (2006 NPC Nationals)
- Squat - 500 lb (230 kg) (best lifts at a body weight of 188 lb (85 kg))
- Stand-up military barbell bicep curls - 150 lb (68 kg) (best lifts at a body weight of 188 lb (85 kg))
- Quads - 27 inches (69 cm)
- Waist - 29 inches (74 cm)
