= Denise Rutkowski =

American professional female bodybuilder

- professional bodybuilder

Personal info
- Nickname: The Golden Panther, Raven
- Born: 1962; Reading, Pennsylvania, U.S.

Best statistics
- Height: 5 ft 5 in (1.65 m)
- Weight: 140–155 lb (64–70 kg)

Professional (Pro) career
- Pro-debut: IFBB Jan Tana Classic; 1993
- Best win: IFBB Jan Tana Classic champion; 1993
- Predecessor: Nikki Fuller
- Successor: Sue Price
- Active: Retired 2001

Denise Lynn Rutkowski is an American former professional female bodybuilder.

== Bodybuilding career ==
Her professional bodybuilding career was brief, and ended shortly after finishing 2nd in the Ms. Olympia contest in 1993. Her sudden retirement shocked the sport, as she was seen as an easy contender for the Ms. Olympia in 1994.

=== Contest history ===
- 1988 NPC South Texas - 1st (MW)
- 1988 NPC Spring City Classic - 1st (HW)
- 1990 NPC Steel Rose - 1st
- 1990 World Gym Classic - 1st
- 1991 NPC Orange County Muscle Classic - 1st (HW & overall)
- 1991 NPC California State Championships - 1st (HW & overall)
- 1992 NPC Nationals - 3rd
- 1993 NPC USA Championships - 1st (HW & overall)
- 1993 IFBB Jan Tana Classic - 1st
- 1993 IFBB Ms. Olympia - 2nd

== Personal life ==
During her bodybuilding career she arrived in San Diego, CA in 1989 from Texas and lived at Mission Beach while training at Gold's Gym Pacific Beach. She lived in San Diego until 1991, when she won the Orange County Muscle Classic and California State Championships, and thereafter moved to Venice, CA to train at Gold's Gym, Venice Beach, California, and had an interest in improving the quality of life for underprivileged children in the neighborhood. She spent time traveling with youth from Venice, California to WWF shows, Disneyland, and sporting events.

In 1994, she went back home to Fort Worth, Texas and she entered Calvary Cathedral International Bible College for two years. By 1996, Rutkowski was going around the country spreading the word of God at various religious revivals. In 2001, Rutkowski started training again, and returned to a better physical condition.

=== Television appearance ===
In 1994, she had a brief appearance on the show Dream On, in the episode "Blinded by the Cheese".
