= Tazzie Colomb =

American professional bodybuilder (born 1966)

- Professional bodybuilder

Personal info
- Nickname: Ragin Cajun
- Born: August 20, 1966 (age 59); New Orleans, Louisiana, U.S.

Best statistics
- Height: 1.70 m (5 ft 7 in) 1.83m with heels
- Weight: Off Season: 196–209 lb (89–95 kg)

Professional (Pro) career
- Pro-debut: IFBB Jan Tana Pro Classic; 1999
- Best win: IFBB Europa Supershow heavyweight champion; 2007
- Predecessor: None
- Successor: Sherry Smith
- Active: Retired since 2013

Tazzie Colomb (born August 20, 1966) is an American professional female bodybuilder and powerlifter. She is one of the longest-competing IFBB female professional body builders of all time. She is one of the strongest female powerlifters in the world: she can lift 75 kg in each arm, and on a TV show easily lifted four girls (weighing 42–43 kg each) at the same time. Her stats are as follows: Chest 128 cm; Waist 89 cm; Hips 107 cm; Size feet 43; Size T-shirt XXXL; Size clothing USA 50" 37" 43"; Size neck 44 cm; Size bicep 47 cm; Size forearm 38 cm; Size wrist 24 cm; Size dress USA 22; Max overhead lift 90 kg; Max dumbbell arm 75 kg.

== Biography ==
Tazzie described herself as a Catholic girl and was a top athlete at St. Pius and Cabrini. She never attended college. Her father is deceased and she has two older sisters, both of whom she no longer speaks to.

== Powerlifter career ==
=== Contest history ===
- 1999 Women's Extravaganza Strength Show - 2nd
- 2001 Women's Extravaganza Strength Show - 6th
- 2002 Women Extravaganza Strength Show - 6th

== Bodybuilding career ==
=== Amateur career ===
In 1988, Tazzie debuted nationally at the NPC Junior Nationals, placing 9th in the heavyweight women's division. In 1992, she won the women's overall at the NPC USA Championships and qualified as an IFBB professional.

=== Professional career ===
At the 2000 Ms. International, Tazzie and Iris Kyle were both disqualified for diuretic use. In 2007, she won the heavyweight class at the IFBB Europa Supershow. She has attended the Ms. Olympia four times during her career. She is one of longest competing IFBB professional bodybuilders of all time. She has placed in the top five 13 times in her professional bodybuilding career up to 2013.

=== Competition history ===
- 1988 NPC Junior Nationals - 9th (heavyweight category (HW))
- 1990 NPC Eastern Seaboard - 2nd (HW)
- 1990 NPC Junior Nationals - 4th (HW)
- 1990 NPC USA Championships - 3rd (HW)
- 1991 IFBB North American Championships - 2nd (HW)
- 1992 NPC USA Championships - 1st (HW & overall)
- 1993 IFBB Jan Tana Pro Classic - 11th
- 1994 IFBB Jan Tana Pro Classic - 3rd
- 1996 IFBB Jan Tana Pro Classic - 3rd
- 1997 IFBB Ms. International - 3rd
- 1997 IFBB Ms. Olympia - 17th
- 1999 IFBB Ms. International - 4th
- 1999 IFBB Ms. Olympia - 6th
- 2000 IFBB Ms. International - 5th (Later disqualified)
- 2001 IFBB Ms. International - 7th
- 2002 IFBB Jan Tana Pro Classic - 3rd (HW)
- 2002 IFBB Show of Strength Pro Championship - 3rd (HW)
- 2006 IFBB Atlantic City Pro - 3rd
- 2006 IFBB Europa Supershow - 4th
- 2006 IFBB Ms. Olympia - 11th
- 2007 IFBB Europa Supershow - 1st (HW)
- 2007 IFBB Ms. Olympia - 12th
- 2008 IFBB Ms. International - 11th
- 2009 IFBB New York Pro Championships - 6th
- 2010 IFBB Battle of Champions - 8th
- 2011 IFBB Battle of Champions - 4th
- 2012 IFBB Battle of Champions - 4th
- 2012 IFBB Chicago Pro Championships - 4th
- 2012 IFBB Tampa Pro Championships - 7th
- 2013 IFBB Ms. International - 9th
- 2013 IFBB Tampa Pro Championships - 13th

== Personal life ==
Tazzie currently lives in New Orleans, Louisiana. She is single. She is the personal trainer of Aaron Neville.
