= Andrulla Blanchette =

English bodybuilder

- Professional bodybuilder
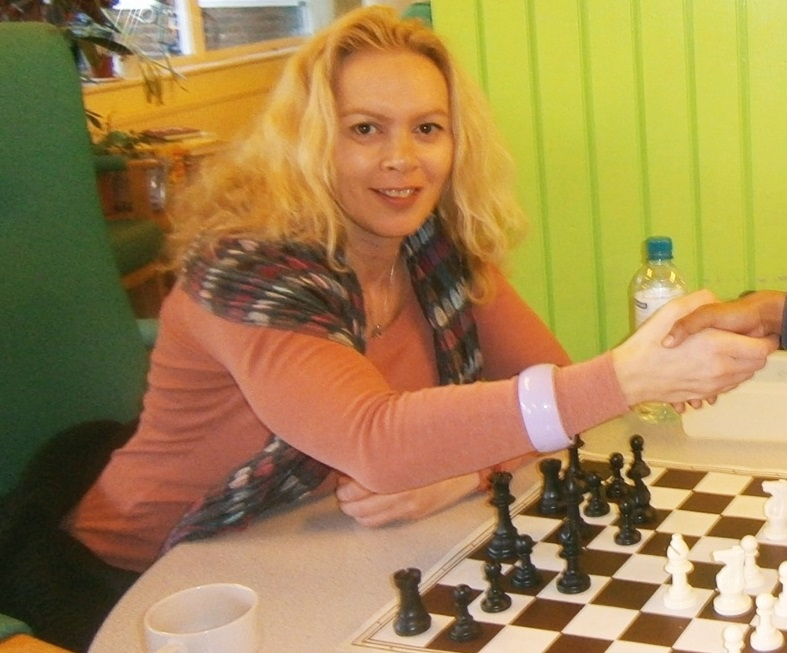
- Andrulla Blanchette on 21 March 2014

Personal info
- Nickname: Iron Goddess
- Born: 29 July 1966 (age 59); Hackney, London, England

Best statistics
- Height: 5 ft 3 in (1.60 m)
- Weight: (On season): 130–158.733 lb (9–11 st; 59–72 kg) (Off season): 145–150 lb (10–11 st; 66–68 kg)

Professional (Pro) career
- Pro-debut: IFBB Jan Tana Pro Classic; 1995
- Best win: Ms. Olympia (Lightweight); 2000
- Predecessor: None
- Successor: Juliette Bergmann
- Active: Retired since 2002

Andrulla Blanchette (born Androulla Veronica Blanchette; 29 July 1966) is an English professional female bodybuilder.

== Bodybuilding career ==
=== Amateur career ===
After Andrulla's judo sessions, she would go to a little room in the small community center with a few weights where she would play around with. A male powerlifter saw potential in her strength and how easily she lifted heavy weights. They became friends and workout partners. In a few weeks, he had her deadlifting 200 lb (14 st; 91 kg) for reps. At her gym, a lot of men and one female were entering bodybuilding competitions. They talked her into entering the Miss London Championships with only a week's notice. She learned some poses the day before and won. While there was 15 women in it who trained for several years, she had more muscle. She obtained her IFBB pro card at the World Games (Netherlands) in 1993. Andrulla is Black Belt First Dan in Judo. From 1986 to 2000, her coach and mentor was her boyfriend, British professional bodybuilder Ian Dowe.

=== Professional career ===
In 1996, Andrulla was named Women's Physique World's European Bodybuilder of the Year. She won the Ms. Olympia lightweight title in 2000, and just missed retaining the title the following year. When asked about drugs, she said, "People aren't stupid, they know what's going on, and I'm not going to insult them with a fib." In 2002, Blanchette was scheduled to compete Ms. International, but was disqualified on Thursday night for not signing a contract to compete.

=== Legacy ===
Currently, she is the only British bodybuilder to win the Ms. Olympia.

=== Competition history ===
Amateur competitions

- 1986 Miss Capital City - 1st
- 1986 EFBB Qualifier (for the under 21s) - 1st
- 1986 Place Junior British Championship - 1st
- 1986 IFBB Junior Worlds - 4th
- 1988 IFBB Women's World Championship - 10th (LW)
- 1992 IFBB Women's World Championship - 3rd (LW)
- 1993 IFBB European Championship - 1st (LW)
- 1993 IFBB World Games - 1st (LW)

Professional competitions

- 1995 IFBB Jan Tana Classic - 6th
- 1996 IFBB European Pro Classic - 3rd
- 1996 IFBB European Cup - 3rd
- 1996 IFBB Ms. International - 11th
- 1996 IFBB Ms. Olympia - 8th
- 1997 IFBB Ms. Olympia - 7th
- 1998 IFBB Ms. International - 6th
- 1998 IFBB Ms. Olympia - 6th
- 1999 IFBB Ms. International - 5th
- 1999 IFBB Ms. Olympia - 7th
- 2000 IFBB Ms. International - 2nd (LW)
- 2000 IFBB Ms. Olympia - 1st (LW)
- 2001 IFBB Ms. Olympia - 2nd (LW)

=== Best statistics ===
- 45 degree leg press - 1,100 lb (79 st; 500 kg) for reps
- Barbell curls - 175 lb (12.5 st; 79 kg)
- Biceps - 17 in (43 cm)
- Chest - 43 in (110 cm)
- Cheat-curled - 180 lb (13 st; 82 kg)
- Dumbbell one-arm rows - 120 lb (8.6 st; 54 kg)
- Height - 5 ft 3 in (1.60 m)
- Incline dumbbell press - 100 lb (7.1 st; 45 kg) each
- Lat-pulldowns - 250 lb (18 st; 110 kg)
- Lats - 43 in (110 cm)
- Leg press - 1,200 lb (86 st; 540 kg)
- On season weight - 130–158 733/1000 lb (9–11 st; 59–72 kg)
- Shoulder press (dumbbell) - 70 lb (5.0 st; 32 kg)
- Thighs - 23 1/2 in (60 cm)

== Personal life ==
Andrulla's mother is Greek Cypriot, while her father is French, Portuguese, German and English. She lives in Cyprus. She is currently an artist, photographer, design worker, chess-player, and personal trainer who owns her own gym in London. She is black belt in Judo. She is a Christian.

=== Television appearance ===
Andrulla has been featured in many UK television shows during her bodybuilding career. In 2002, Blanchette starred on the TV show Lexx, in the episode "Viva Lexx Vegas", as "Queen of Sheba".

=== Motion picture appearance ===
In 2003, Blanchette starred in the film, The Interplanetary Surplus Male and Amazon Women of Outer Space, as an Amazon.

Ms. Olympia
New title	Lightweight Champion; 2000	Succeeded by Juliette Bergmann; Overall Champion
