= Christa Bauch =

German bodybuilder

- Professional bodybuilder

Personal info
- Born: December 19, 1947 (age 78); Bad Schandau, Saxony, Allied Germany

Best statistics
- Height: 5 ft 4 in (1.63 m)
- Weight: 154 lb (70 kg)

Christa Bauch (born December 19, 1947) is a former professional female bodybuilder from Germany.

Born in Bad Schandau, East Germany, Bauch enjoyed music, riding and sprinting at school, before training as a masseuse and swimming pool medic. At 27 she left East Germany to settle in the West; this was done legally, as she married a West German citizen and waited the required five years for an exit permit. Her oldest son, Daniel, was five years old, and she was pregnant with her second child, Patricia. Shortly after she relocated to West Germany, her husband, employed by the German engineering company AEG, was transferred to Baghdad. Further spells followed in Guatemala and Algeria, before Bauch returned to Germany on her own with the children, to ensure they got a proper education. Her third child, Rene, was born a few years later.

Looking for a challenge, Bauch took up rifle shooting for several years before taking up bodybuilding. Bauch won several local and regional shows before her first big competitive year in 1987. After only two years training she took second places in the NABBA German, European and World championships (in the last of these losing out to American Connie McCloskey). In 1988 she switched to the WABBA organization, taking the overall European title as well as the couples title. The following year she move to the IFBB. After a disappointing second place in the German Nationals, Bauch won the World Games heavyweight title in Karlsruhe (only 20 miles from her home), beating out a strong field including countrywoman Jutta Tippelt and American Kim King. With the World Games victory she earned her pro card.

Bauch’s first pro show was the 1990 Ms. International, at age 43. After turning in an impressive fourth place finish, she was disqualified as a result of a positive drug test (WPW, 1993). More problems followed as Bauch had to have an operation later that year to remove a vein in her leg. A few months later she bounced back with a fourth place finish in the Italian Grand Prix in Rimini, missing a Ms. Olympia qualification by one slot.

Bauch’s highest placing as a professional was second at the 1994 Canada Cup. She retired from competition after the 1995 Jan Tana Classic. Although she no longer competes, she continues to train. At a height of 5’3″, Bauch’s normal contest weight ranged from 132 to 145 pounds.

== Contest history ==
- 1987 German Championship – 2nd
- 1987 Europa Championship (NABBA) – 2nd
- 1987 World Championship (NABBA) – 2nd
- 1988 Europa Championship (WABBA) – 1st
- 1989 German Championship (IFBB) – 2nd
- 1989 World Games (IFBB) – 1st (Pro qualifier)
- 1990 Ms. International – 4th (later disqualified)
- 1991 Grand Prix of Italy – 4th
- 1992 Jan Tana Classic – 11th
- 1993 Jan Tana Classic – 7th
- 1993 IFBB Ms. Olympia – 18th
- 1994 Canada Cup – 2nd
- 1994 IFBB Ms. Olympia – 12th
- 1995 Jan Tana Classic – 5th
