= Lesa Lewis =

American professional bodybuilder

- Professional bodybuilder

Personal info
- Nickname: Amazon
- Born: March 9, 1967 (age 59); Kansas City, Missouri, U.S.

Best statistics
- Height: 5 ft 10 in (1.78 m)
- Weight: In Season: 150–193 lb (68–88 kg); Off-Season: 200–215 lb (91–98 kg)

Professional (Pro) career
- Pro-debut: IFBB Jan Tana Classic; 1997
- Best win: IFBB Jan Tana Classic champion; 1998
- Predecessor: Chris Bongiovanni
- Successor: Gayle Moher
- Active: Retired 2002

Lesa Lewis (born March 9, 1967) is an American professional female bodybuilder, nicknamed "Amazon".

== Early life ==
Lesa Lewis was born in Kansas City, Missouri, U.S. She grew up in a family with three brothers and three sisters. She ran track, played basketball, danced, and swam in high school. She attended University of Nebraska–Lincoln for a year, running the sprints-400 m (0.40 km) 100 m (328.08 ft), 200 m (656.17 ft) meters, and the 400 mi (643.74 km) relays. She left college to be a freelance modeling designer of clothing, hats, and shoes. After a few years, she went into construction at 130 lb (59 kg).

== Bodybuilding career ==
=== Amateur ===
In 1992, Lesa began weight training. That year, she was training to get fit and toned at a Bally Total Fitness when a bodybuilder commented she had muscular legs and told her she should try bodybuilding. After that, she went into bodybuilding. In 1994, her coach became Tim Lutz. At the 1997 USA Championship, Lewis placed first in the heavyweight category and overall and won her IFBB pro card.

=== Professional ===
At the 1998 Ms. International, Lewis placed second at the competition. However, a week after the contest, when the results of the mandatory diuretic tests were declared, she, along with Gayle Moher and Denise Masino, were found to have tested positive and were disqualified from the contest.

=== Contest history ===
- 1992 Missouri State Championships – 2nd
- 1993 Missouri State Championships – 1st
- 1994 Heart of America – 1st
- 1995 Red River Classic – 1st
- 1996 Lone Star Classic – 1st
- 1996 NPC Junior Nationals – 1st (HW)
- 1996 NPC Nationals – 4th (HW)
- 1997 NPC USA Championship – 1st (HW and overall)
- 1997 IFBB Jan Tana Classic – 5th
- 1998 IFBB Ms. International – 2nd (disqualified)
- 1998 IFBB Jan Tana Classic – 1st
- 1998 IFBB Ms. Olympia – 4th
- 1999 IFBB Ms. International – 2nd
- 1999 IFBB Ms. Olympia – 5th
- 2000 IFBB Ms. International – 5th (HW)
- 2000 IFBB Ms. Olympia – 3rd (HW)
- 2001 IFBB Ms. International – 3rd (HW)
- 2001 IFBB Ms. Olympia – 5th (HW)
- 2002 IFBB GNC Show of Strength – 5th (HW)

== Personal life ==
=== Television appearance ===
Lewis appeared in the 2000 documentary film Bodybuilders.
