= Shelley Beattie =

American bodybuilder (1967–2008)

- Professional bodybuilder

Personal info
- Nickname: Siren, Frosted Blonde
- Born: August 24, 1967; Orange County, California, U.S.
- Died: February 16, 2008 (aged 40); Portland, Oregon, U.S.

Best statistics
- Height: 5 ft 7 in (1.70 m)
- Weight: (In Season): 150-175 lb (Off-Season):180–205 lb

Professional (Pro) career
- Pro-debut: IFBB Ms. International; 1991
- Best win: IFBB Ms. Olympia, 3rd place; 1992
- Predecessor: Laura Creavalle
- Successor: Laura Creavalle
- Active: Retired 1993

Shelley Ann Beattie (August 24, 1967 – February 16, 2008) was a professional female bodybuilder and actress. Beattie's highest placement was the top three at the Ms. International and Ms. Olympia contests, the two most prestigious shows for female professional bodybuilders. She was one of the few deaf professional female bodybuilders in the world, making the cover of Deaf Life magazine twice in the 1990s. After her retirement from bodybuilding competitions, she joined the sailing crew of Mighty Mary, as a grinder, for the 1995 Citizen Cup, losing in the final race to determine the US sailboat that would advance to the 1995 America's Cup. In 2008, she died by suicide.

== Early life ==
Shelley Beattie was born in Orange County, California. Beattie's mother was a 6-foot-tall (1.8 m) athlete, while her sister, who was 5-foot-10-inch (1.78 m), played college basketball at Portland State University.

Beattie slowly became deaf after a salicylate poisoning (aspirin overdose) at the age of 3, commenting as an adult that she has no idea why her 3-year-old self had suddenly decided that eating aspirin was a treat. By the time she was 10, the intense and ongoing ear infections caused by the poisoning had caused irreparable damage to one ear and 30% hearing loss in the other ear. In school, she learned sign language and had several operations and speech therapy to improve her ability to communicate. However, Beattie was socially isolated due to her deafness and turned to sports as an outlet. She competed in track and field, including the heptathlon, cross country, hurdling, and 400 meter sprints. She also set a school record for the low hurdles. At the age of 14, she began lifting weights to improve her times. At age 16, Beattie sustained an ankle injury that she believed was career-ending.

Beattie's home life was unstable. Between the ages of 14 and 17, she had been placed in three different foster homes and had attended three different schools. She turned to weightlifting as an outlet to cope with anxiety and frustration.

Beattie attended Western Oregon State College in Monmouth from 1984 to 1988, graduating with a degree in child psychology and special education. During this time, she also studied jazz dance and choreography, and joined a dance company.

== Bodybuilding career ==
Beattie began entering and competing in amateur bodybuilding competitions at this time. In her first competition, the Portland Rose Cup Novice, she weighed in at 124 pounds (56 kg) and finished fourth in the heavyweight class. Soon, she began reaching the top five of every amateur competition she entered, including several wins. She developed a friendly rivalry with fellow bodybuilder Nikki Fuller, often times finishing second to her in competitions.

In 1989, Beattie met Aaron Shelley, an exercise and physiology graduate at Oregon State. With Shelley, she improved her diet and training, resulting in her taking the overall title at the 1990 NPC Emerald Cup and the Pacific Coast Championships. After winning the overall title at the 1990 NPC USA Championship, she turned pro. As a professional, she competed at a height of 5 feet 7 inches (1.70 m) and a body weight of around 144 pounds (65 kg). Due to internal politics at the International Federation of BodyBuilders, she was unable to enter the 1990 Ms. Olympia after her USA Championship win.

She went on to enter the 1991 Ms. International, finishing third. At the 1991 Ms. Olympia, she placed seventh. In the 1992 Ms. Olympia, her placement of third was her highest professional bodybuilding achievement. Beattie retired after placing seventh in the 1993 Ms. Olympia contest.

== Other work ==
While competitive bodybuilding, Beattie had started working as a group home counsellor for developmentally delayed teenagers, which she continued after 1993.

In 1995, she competed as a grinder on the America³ sailing team (the first all-women's America's Cup team). She also joined the cast of the American Gladiators TV series under the name "Siren", competing in 44 episodes between 1992 and 1997. Because she was deaf, she took visual cues from referee Larry Thompson and fellow gladiators. Spectators would also wave their hands in the air or stomp their feet instead of applauding.

== Documentary ==
A documentary about her life called Siren: The Voices of Shelley Beattie premiered on HBO Max. Narrated and produced by Marlee Matlin, its debut was on September 22, 2026.

== Personal life and death ==
Beattie was bisexual. She had a six-year relationship with John Romano "Control Freak", a magazine columnist at Muscular Development.

At the time of her death, Beattie lived on a farm east of Salem, Oregon, with girlfriend Julie Moisa.

Beattie was diagnosed with bipolar disorder. On February 13, 2008, she attempted suicide by hanging and died three days later, aged 40.

== Filmography ==
- American Gladiators (TV Series) – Siren (1992–1996)
- Hot Shots! Part Deux (1993) – Siren

== Contest history ==
- 1986 – Portland Rose Cup Novice 4th (HW)
- 1987 – Collegiate Emerald Empire 1st (HW)
- 1987 – Portland Rose Cup Novice 3rd (HW)
- 1988 – Portland Rose Cup Novice 3rd (HW)
- 1988 – Oregon Championships 3rd (HW)
- 1989 – Western Oregon Championships 1st (HW)
- 1989 – Collegiate Emerald Empire 1st (HW)
- 1989 – Vancouver Natural Championships 1st (HW)
- 1989 – Portland Rose Cup Novice 1st (HW)
- 1989 – NPC Emerald Cup 2nd (HW)
- 1989 – Pacific Coast Championships 2nd (HW)
- 1990 – NPC Emerald Cup – 1st (HW & overall)
- 1990 – NPC USA Championship – 1st (HW & overall)
- 1991 – IFBB Ms. International – 3rd
- 1991 – IFBB Ms. Olympia – 7th
- 1992 – IFBB Ms. International – 7th
- 1992 – IFBB Ms. Olympia – 3rd
- 1993 – IFBB Ms. International – 9th
- 1993 – IFBB Ms. Olympia – 7th

== Other competitions ==
- 1994 Grinder on America3 America's Cup team – 2nd
- 1995 Grinder on America3 America's Cup team – 2nd

== Magazine covers ==
- December 1990 – MuscleMag International
- July 1991 – Deaf Life
- January 1991 – NPC News
- December 1992 – Deaf Life
- March 1993 – Female Bodybuilding
- August 1993 – Muscular Development
- December 1993 – Iron Man
- February 1994 – Muscular Development
- September 1994 – Muscular Development
- November 1994 – Women's Physique World
- January 1998 – Muscular Development
