= Sharon Bruneau =

Canadian female bodybuilder

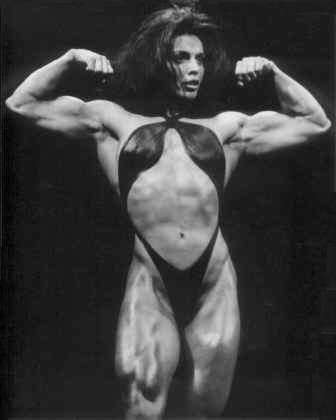
Sharon Leigh Bruneau
- professional bodybuilder

Personal info
- Born: February 1, 1964 (age 61); Timmins, Ontario, Canada

Best statistics
- Height: 5 ft 9 in (1.75 m)

Professional (Pro) career
- Pro-debut: 1991 IFBB North American Championships
- Active: Retired in 1995

Sharon Leigh Bruneau (born February 1, 1964) is a model and retired professional Canadian female bodybuilder and fitness competitor.

== Career ==
She began her career as a fashion model, at which she was successful until contracting a bad case of pneumonia, which caused her to lose a lot of weight. Soon after her recovery, she began training with weights to regain the weight she needed to get back to modelling. After achieving a somewhat toned build, she was rejected at model agencies for being oversized. She then decided to give up modeling and dedicate herself to bodybuilding. During her bodybuilding career Sharon had gained nearly 50 pounds, but then cut back when she changed to fitness competitions. Bruneau was on the cover of Muscle & Fitness and Flex.

Weider Health and Fitness publications had taken Sharon on as one of their first ever signed female representatives from 1991-1998.

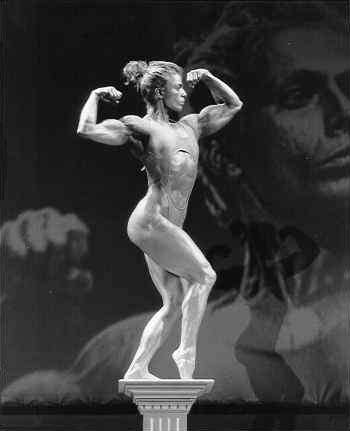
Sharon Bruneau guest-posing at the 1992 Emerald Cup in Seattle

Sharon retired from bodybuilding competition after the 1994 Ms. Olympia contest, switching to fitness competition. After placing 11th out of 17 competitors in the 1995 Fitness Olympia, Sharon had noted that her low ranking was due to her muscularity. In 1997, Ms. Fitness Olympia's judging procedure involved awarding points to the women with an overall toned body and marking down those who appeared "overly muscular". Sharon can now be found inspiring people all over the world with her motivational workshops where she speaks about health and fitness.

She has had minor roles in the movies: Tornado Run (1995), Nemesis 2: Nebula (1995), Nemesis 3: Prey Harder (1996), and R.S.V.P. (2002). In 2007, she did minor stuntwork for the movie Smokin' Aces. Sharon was also offered a role in the movie Endangered Species (1982) to play a bad alien. Around the 1980s and 1990s, many agents were recruiting body builders and wrestlers for sci-fi films. This, in turn, offered a wider range in career possibilities for fitness and bodybuilding athletes.

== Contest history ==
- 1991 IFBB North American Championships - 1st (HW)
- 1991 IFBB North American Championships - Overall Winner
- 1992 Ms. International - 4th
- 1992 IFBB Ms. Olympia - 11th
- 1993 Ms. International - 7th
- 1993 IFBB Ms. Olympia - 10th
- 1994 Ms. International - 6th
- 1994 IFBB Ms. Olympia - 16th
- 1995 Fitness Olympia - 11th

== Films ==
- Tornado Run - 1995 action movie (VHS and DVD)
- Nemesis 2: Nebula - 1995 sci-fi action thriller with Sue Price and Debbie Muggli (VHS)
- Nemesis 3: Time Lapse - 1996 sci-fi action thriller with Sue Price, Debbie Muggli, Ursula Alberto (VHS)
- R.S.V.P. - 2002 horror movie
- Smokin' Aces - 2007 action movie (DVD)
