= Sue Price =

American bodybuilder and actress (born 1965)

- Professional bodybuilder

Personal info
- Born: 1965 (age 60–61); Mount Prospect, Illinois, U.S.

Best statistics
- Height: 5 ft 0 in (1.52 m)
- Weight: 118 lb (54 kg)

Professional (Pro) career
- Pro-debut: IFBB Jan Tana Classic; 1994
- Best win: IFBB Jan Tana Classic champion; 1994
- Predecessor: Denise Rutkowski
- Successor: Michele Ralabate

Sue Price (born 1965) is an American professional bodybuilder, martial artist, and actress. She played Alex Sinclair in the Nemesis film series, a character inspired by the movie's original hero, Alex Rain, a member of the LAPD.

== Life ==
Price attended Lions Park Elementary, Lincoln Junior High School, and Prospect High School before graduating from Northern Illinois University, in DeKalb, Illinois. While there, she developed an interest in bodybuilding. Following this, she briefly lived in Chicago's Northwest suburbs before moving to the west coast to further her bodybuilding career.

Price had a limited run as a film star, being cast as the heroine Alex Sinclair in the Albert Pyun films Nemesis 2: Nebula, Nemesis 3: Prey Harder and Nemesis 4: Death Angel and in Dustin Ferguson's films Nemesis 5 The New Model, House of Pain and Robowoman.

== Filmography ==
Year	Title	Role	Notes
1995	Nemesis 2: Nebula	Alex	
1996	Nemesis 3: Prey Harder	Alex	
1996	Nemesis 4: Death Angel	Alex Sinclair	
2017	Nemesis 5: The New Model	Alex Sinclair	
2018	House of Pain	Shella	
2019	RoboWoman	Carlenee	
2023	Cobra Strike Force	Macho	
2024	Mannequin	Gerri	
TBA	Cyborg: Overture	Aria Stratocaster	
TBA	Nemesis 6	Alex Sinclair	

== Bodybuilding career ==
=== Contest history ===
- 1990 NPC Nationals - 5th (LW)
- 1991 NPC Nationals - 5th (LW)
- 1992 NPC Nationals - 5th (LW)
- 1993 NPC Nationals - 1st (LW and overall)
- 1994 IFBB Jan Tana Classic - 1st
- 1994 IFBB Ms. Olympia - 6th
- 1995 IFBB Ms. Olympia - 4th
