= Debbie Muggli =

American actress and female bodybuilder (born 1964)

- ♀ Professional bodybuilder

Personal info
- Born: August 14, 1964 (age 61); Texas, U.S.

Best statistics
- Height: 5 ft 5 in (1.65 m)
- Weight: In Season: 119.9315–159.8351 lb (54.4000–72.5000 kg)

Professional (Pro) career
- Pro-debut: IFBB Jan Tana Pro; 1991
- Best win: IFBB North American Championships heavyweight and overall champion; 1990
- Predecessor: Lenda Murray
- Successor: Sharon Bruneau

Debbie Muggli (born August 14, 1964) is an American actress and female bodybuilder. She made her acting debut on the TV sitcom Martin and appeared in the films Nemesis 2: Nebula and Nemesis 3: Prey Harder.

== Bodybuilding career ==
=== Professional ===
==== Competition history ====
- 1987 Lackland Championships - 1st (MW and overall)
- 1988 Muscle Beach (Galveston) - 1st (MW and overall)
- 1989 Lone Star Classic - 1st (HW and overall)
- 1990 NPC National Juniors - 1st (HW and overall)
- 1990 IFBB North American Championships - 1st (HW and overall)
- 1991 IFBB Jan Tana Pro - 7th
- 1991 IFBB Ms. International - 4th
- 1992 IFBB Ms. International - 2nd
- 1992 IFBB Ms. Olympia - 10th
- 1993 IFBB Ms. International - 2nd
- 1993 IFBB Ms. Olympia - 4th
- 1994 IFBB Ms. International - 2nd
- 1994 IFBB Ms. Olympia - 4th
- 1995 IFBB Ms. International - 3rd
- 1995 IFBB Ms. Olympia - 6th
