= Nikki Fuller =

American professional bodybuilder (born 1968)

- Professional bodybuilder
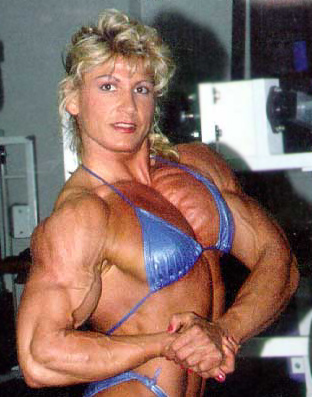

Personal info
- Born: January 23, 1968 (age 58); Dayton, Ohio, U.S.

Best statistics
- Height: 5’9
- Weight: 185–195 lb (84–88 kg)

Professional (Pro) career
- Best win: IFBB Jan Tana Classic champion; 1992
- Predecessor: Sue Gafner
- Successor: Denise Rutkowski

Nikki Fuller (born January 23, 1968) is an American professional female bodybuilder. At her largest, Fuller weighed 200 lb (91 kg). In competition, her height was listed at 5 ft 9 in (1.75 m) and her biceps measured 18 in (457 mm). Some of her best lifts are 315 lb (143 kg) for a max on bench press and 1100 lbs for multiple reps on leg press.

== Early life ==
Born Nikki Garner in Dayton, Ohio, she moved with her family to Gresham, Oregon, when she was 10 years old. She developed an interest in athletics while a student at Gresham High School. Fuller competed in track and field and, as a freshman in 1983, helped her team go undefeated and take 1st in the water polo state championship.

Post-graduation, Fuller set her focus on bodybuilding, having realized her own potential through sports. When she started training at a local gym, Fuller weighed 123 lb (56 kg) but soon added 20 lb (9 kg) of muscle.

== Personal life ==
According to posts on her personal Instagram profile, Fuller is a conservative and ardent supporter of President Donald Trump. She is also a professing Christian.

== Career ==
=== Bodybuilding ===
She made her competitive debut at the 1988 Novice Oregon and won 1st place. Fuller then set her sights on bigger stages and took third place at the 1988 Emerald Cup, a contest she would come back to win the following year. Fuller turned pro after winning the heavyweight and overall titles at the 1990 National Physique Committee Nationals.

In 1988 and 1989, Fuller took first in the Henry Weinhard's Handcar Races in Sacramento, San Francisco and Portland, Oregon, as well as Labatt's in British Columbia. She was subsequently sponsored by Henry Weinhard's. Her professional career included a 1st-place finish at the 1992 Jan Tana Classic and Top 10 finishes at the Ms. Olympia and Ms. International contests.

In 1993, Fuller was featured on the cover of The Women, a photography book of top female bodybuilders compiled by Bill Dobbins.

==== Stats ====
Measurements

- Height: 5'9" (175.26 cm)
- Weight: 185 lbs (83.9 kg) to 195 lbs (88.4 kg)
- Biceps: 17" (425 mm)
- Chest: 52" (1320,8 mm)
- Waist: 27" (685,8 mm)
- Hips: 36" (914,4 mm)

==== Contest history ====
- 1988 Novice Oregon – 1st
- 1988 Emerald Cup – 3rd
- 1989 Emerald Cup – 1st
- 1989 Bill Pearl Classic – 1st
- 1989 Pacific Coast – 1st
- 1989 Emerald Cup – 1st
- 1989 Orange County Classic – 2nd
- 1990 NPC USA Championship – 2nd (HW)
- 1990 IFBB North American – 2nd (HW)
- 1990 IFBB World Amateurs – 3rd (HW)
- 1990 NPC Nationals – 1st (HW & overall)
- 1991 Jan Tana Classic – 8th
- 1991 Ms. International – 7th
- 1992 Jan Tana Classic – 1st
- 1992 Ms. Olympia – 9th
- 1993 Ms. Olympia – 14th
- 1995 Ms. International – 6th
- 1996 Jan Tana Classic – 7th
- 1997 Ms. International – 10th

=== Acting ===
In 1999, Fuller shifted her attention away from bodybuilding for the first time in eleven years and turned her eyes toward Hollywood. She relocated to Los Angeles and subsequently landed uncredited TV roles in Ally McBeal (as a body double for lead actress Calista Flockhart in Season 5 Episode 12, "The New Day") and Arli$$ (in Season 7 Episode 6, "Moments to Remember" as a background actor in a scene featuring Jim Turner, Jack LaLanne and Tony Gonzalez). She also had a credited appearance in Just Shoot Me! (opposite David Spade as a female boxer in Season 5 Episode 10, "Finch and the Fighter").

Fuller was also seen in a 2001 Right Guard Extreme commercial with Dave Chappelle as one of two female wrestlers.

=== Wrestling ===
Fuller was featured on the television show Women of Wrestling (WOW) as Athena; after her contract with WOW ended, she continued wrestling professionally under her own name. From 2001 to 2004 she was with Ultimate Pro Wrestling (UPW), a company that represents World Wrestling Entertainment as a West Coast talent house.
