= Marie Mahabir =

French West Indes bodybuilder

Marie Laure Mahabir
- Professional bodybuilder

Personal info
- Born: 8 August 1962 (age 64); Le Moule, Guadeloupe

Best statistics
- Height: 1.63 m (5 ft 4 in)
- Weight: 59–66 kg (130–146 lb) (in-season); 70–73 kg (off-season)

Professional (Pro) career
- Pro-debut: IFBB World Pro Championships; 1989
- Best win: NABBA World Physique Champion, Three Times; 1985-1987
- Predecessor: Gabrielle Sievers
- Successor: Leisa Campbell
- Active: since 1996

Marie Laure Mahabir is a former professional bodybuilder and personal trainer of the French West Indies. As a bodybuilder, she became well known for development of the chest muscles, the biceps, and back muscles. Her highest achievement as a professional bodybuilder was reaching the top-five at both the Ms. International and Ms. Olympia in 1994. Today, Mahabir lives in France and works as a personal trainer.

== Biography ==
Marie Mahabir was born in Le Moule on 8 August 1962; a port in Guadeloupe in the French West Indies. Her Indian family moved to the Islands of Guadeloupe in the Caribbean in the end of the 19th century where the plantations needed labors after the abolition of the slavery. Born in a large family of five boys and two girls, Marie passed her early years in Le Moule. Her parents divorced when she was ten years old. Her mother was remarried to an amateur of bodybuilding and moved to Les Abymes with the children. Initiated by her step-father, Marie began to practice bodybuilding at her teenage.

She befriended WABBA Champion Raymond Jollet who took her under her wing and became her mentor.

Mahabir quickly managed to master her newfound passion and quickly managed to move up the amateur ranks by winning the Ms. Guadeloupe title in 1984 and the 1985, 86, and 87 NABBA World Physique Championships. She soon turned pro and switched to the IFBB in 1989. After turning professional in 1987 Laure decided to move to France in order to continue her career as a bodybuilder. She moved to Paris in 1989 where she soon became a popular and much-sought-out personal trainer. There she befriended Momo Benaziza with whom she kept a close friendship until his death. In France Marie continued to compete regularly after joining the IFBB in 1989. At the peak of her career she managed to reach the top-five at both the Ms. International and Ms. Olympia in 1994; the two most prestigious competitions for a female professional bodybuilder in the world. After placing 13th at the 1995 Ms. Olympia, Mahabir retired from competitive bodybuilding.

In a 1993 Interview with Musclemag International she expressed her desire to become a school teacher.

== Contest history ==
- 1984 Ms. Guadalupe, 1st
- 1985 NABBA World Physique Championships, 1st
- 1986 NABBA World Physique Championships, 1st
- 1987 NABBA World Physique Championships, 1st
- 1989 IFBB World Pro Championships, 10th
- 1989 IFBB Ms. Olympia, 9th
- 1990 IFBB Ms. Olympia, 8th
- 1991 IFBB Grand Prix Italy, 3rd
- 1991 IFBB Ms International, 5th
- 1991 IFBB Ms. Olympia, 12th
- 1991 IFBB Ms. International, 9th
- 1991 IFBB Jan Tana Pro Classic, 12th
- 1993 IFBB Ms. Olympia, 16th
- 1994 IFBB Ms International, 4th
- 1994 IFBB Ms. Olympia, 4th
- 1995 IFBB Ms. Olympia, 13th

== Magazine references ==
- Shuey-Roche, Josette. Marie Mahabir Interview. Nebraska: Muscle Mag International (no. 134). August 1993. USPS 4601. (Lincoln, NE: Canusa Products/Foote & Davies, 1992.). Instruction Section: pages 50 and 51 cover 'Marie’s interview.
- Luoma, T.C. No-Nonsense Training: Marie Mahabir Back Attack. Nebraska: Muscle Mag International (no. 134). August 1993. USPS 4601. (Lincoln, NE: Canusa Products/Foote & Davies, 1992.). Biography Section: pages 44–46, and 48 cover Marie Mahabir’s article.
