= Laura Binetti =

Canadian bodybuilder

- Professional bodybuilder

Personal info
- Born: March 6, 1965 (age 60); Toronto, Ontario, Canada

Best statistics

Professional (Pro) career
- Pro-debut: IFBB North American Championships; 1989
- Best win: IFBB World Pro Championships; 1999
- Active: Retired since 2000

Laura Binetti (born March 6, 1965) is a former professional Canadian female bodybuilder. She currently lives in Omaha, Nebraska.

== Personal life ==
Binetti stated her favorite bodybuilder is Juliette Bergmann. She got married and moved to the U.S. to live with her husband in Omaha, Nebraska and expand her fitness consulting business.

== Bodybuilding career ==
After coming fourth in the Jan Tana Classic Binetti retired from bodybuilding. She tried to make a comeback in 2007 and 2008, but for medical reasons she withdrew and now focuses on expanding her business in the USA.

=== Contest history ===
- 1986 Steeles City Classic & CNE - 1st (LW)
- 1986 Ontario Championships - 5th (LW)
- 1987 Southern Ontario Championships - 1st (LW)
- 1987 Eastern Canadian Championships - 1st (LW)
- 1987 Canadian Championships - 3rd (LW)
- 1988 Ontario Mixed Pairs Championships - 1st
- 1988 Canadian Mixed Pairs Championships - 1st
- 1988 Women's World Amateur Bodybuilding Championships - 7th (LW)
- 1988 Canadian Championships - 1st (LW)
- 1989 CNE Invitational - 1st (MW and Overall Winner)
- 1989 Canadian Championships - 1st (LW and Overall Winner)
- 1989 IFBB North American Championships - 1st (MW)
- 1989 IFBB World Amateur Championships - 2nd (MW)
- 1990 IFBB Ms. International - 4th
- 1991 IFBB Ms. International - 12th
- 1993 IFBB Ms. Olympia - 17th
- 1994 IFBB Grand Prix Canada - 1st
- 1994 IFBB Ms. International - 8th
- 1994 IFBB Ms. Olympia - 11th
- 1995 IFBB Grand Prix Prague - 2nd
- 1995 IFBB Ms. Olympia - 12th
- 1996 IFBB Grand Prix Prague - 1st
- 1996 IFBB Grand Prix Slovakia - 2nd
- 1997 IFBB Jan Tana Classic - 3rd
- 1997 IFBB Ms International - 9th
- 1997 IFBB Ms. Olympia - 13rd
- 1999 IFBB Ms. International - 8th
- 1999 IFBB World Pro Championships - 1st
- 1999 IFBB Ms. Olympia - 8th
- 2000 IFBB Jan Tana Pro Classic - 4th
