= 1985 Ms. Olympia =

Women's professional bodybuilding competition

- Promotion: IFBB
- Date: November 30, 1985
- Venue: Felt Forum
- City: New York City, New York, United States

Event chronology
| 1984 Ms. Olympia | 1985 Ms. Olympia | 1986 Ms. Olympia |

The 1985 Ms. Olympia contest was an IFBB professional bodybuilding competition that was held on November 30, 1985, at the Felt Forum in Madison Square Garden in New York City, New York. It was the sixth Ms. Olympia competition held.

== Rounds ==
- Round 1 (Symmetry Round): Judging the balance and proportion of contestants' physiques.
- Round 2 (Muscularity Round): Focused on muscle size and definition.
- Round 3 (Compulsory Poses Round): Contestants performed specific mandatory poses to highlight their muscle groups.
- Round 4 (Posing Routine Round): A choreographed routine to music, allowing contestants to creatively display their physiques and presentation skills.

== Results ==
| Place | Prize | Name |
|---|---|---|
| 1 | $15,000 | (United States) Cory Everson |
| 2 | | (United States) Mary Roberts |
| 3 | | (United States) Diana Dennis |
| 4 | | (United States) Carla Dunlap |
| 5 | | (United States) Clare Furr |
| 6 | | (United States) Tina Plakinger |
| 7 | | (Netherlands) Ellen Van Maris |
| 8 | | (United States) Gladys Portugues |
| 9 | | (United States) Lori Bowen-Rice |
| 10 | | (Finland) Marjo Selin |
| 11 | | (United States) Dinah Anderson |
| 12 | | (West Germany) Vera Bendal |
| 13 | | (United States) Kay Baxter |
| 14 | | (Netherlands) Erika Mes |
| 15 | | (Netherlands) Juliette Bergmann |
| 16 | | (United States) Lynn Conkwright |
| 17 | | (United States) Dona Oliveira |
| 18 | | (Canada) Joy Nichols |
| 19 | | (United States) Lynne Pirie |
| 20 | | (United Kingdom) Carolyn Cheshire |
| 21 | | (United States) Anita Gandol |
| 22 | | (United States) Kris Alexander |
| 23 | | (United States) Lydia Cheng |

=== Scorecard ===
| Name Comp # | Rd. 1 | Rd. 2 | Rd. 3 | Pose- down | Place |
|---|---|---|---|---|---|
| Corinna Everson 21 | 5 | 10 | 15 | 20 | 1 |
| Mary Roberts 20 | 10 | 21 | 31 | 41 | 2 |
| Diana Dennis 23 | 19 | 40 | 58 | 73 | 3 |
| Carla Dunlap 4 | 22 | 44 | 64 | 84 | 4 |
| Claire Furr 9 | 18 | 35 | 62 | 86 | 5 |
| Tina Plakinger 13 | 31 | 62 | 89 | 119 | 6 |
| Ellen Van Maris 8 | 38 | 74 | 112 | | 7 |
| Gladys Portugues 14 | 40 | 83 | 125 | | 8 |
| Lori Bowen Rice 5 | 48 | 96 | 145 | | 9 |
| Marjo Selin 16 | 57 | 110 | 160 | | 10 |
| Diana Anderson 22 | 55 | 110 | 165 | | 11 |
| Vera Bendel 10 | 54 | 111 | 172 | | 12 |
| Kay Baxter 3 | 67 | 137 | 205 | | 13 |

== Notable events ==
- The event, staged for the first time in New York, was witnessed by a crowd of 5,114, largest ever in the six-year history of the competition.
- For the first time, the women were tested for steroids and everybody passed.

== See also ==
- 1985 Mr. Olympia
