= 1987 Ms. Olympia =

Women's professional bodybuilding competition

- Promotion: IFBB
- Date: 1987
- City: New York City, New York, United States

Event chronology
1986 Ms. Olympia	1987 Ms. Olympia	1988 Ms. Olympia

The 1987 Ms. Olympia contest was an IFBB professional bodybuilding competition was held in 1987 in New York City, New York. It was the 8th Ms. Olympia competition held.

== Prize money ==
- 1st - $25,000
- 2nd - $12,000
- 3rd - $7,000
- 4th - $5,000
- 5th - $3,000
- 6th - $2,500

== Rounds ==
- Round 1 (Symmetry Round): Judging the overall balance and proportion of the contestants' physiques.
- Round 2 (Muscularity Round): Focused on muscle size and definition.
- Round 3 (Compulsory Poses Round): Contestants performed specific mandatory poses to highlight their muscle groups.
- Round 4 (Posing Routine Round): A choreographed posing routine to music, allowing contestants to creatively display their physiques and presentation skills.

== Results ==
Place	Prize	Name
1		(United States) Cory Everson
2		(Netherlands) Ellen Van Maris
3		(Australia) Bev Francis
4		(West Germany) Anja Langer
5		(United States) Mary Roberts
6		(Finland) Marjo Selin
7		(United States) Janice Ragain
8		(United States) Diana Dennis
9		(Netherlands) Juliette Bergmann
10		(West Germany) Renate Holland
11		(United States) Sue Ann McKean
12		(United States) Carla Dunlap
13		(France) Dominique Darde
14		(United States) Cathey Palyo
15		(Italy) Maria Concetta Serio
16		(West Germany) Gundi Froder

=== Scorecard ===
Contestant, Country (In order of appearance)	Round 1	Round 2	Round 3	Pose Down	Final Place
Juliette Bergmann, Holland	49	48	48		9
Janice Ragain, U.S.A.	36	42	33		7
Sue Ann McKean, U.S.A.	56	57			11
Carla Dunlap, U.S.A.	59	61	48		12
Mary Roberts, U.S.A.	31	28	33	25	5
Bev Francis, Australia/U.S.A.	15	18	11	13	3
Cathey Palyo, U.S.A.	67	63	62		14
Ellen Van Maris, Holland	11	14	15	13	2
Renate Holland, Germany	50	55	55		10
Anja Langer, Germany	22	17	21	21	4
Diana Dennis, U.S.A.	41	38	38		8
Maria Serio, Italy	73	68	70		15
Dominique Dardé, France	78	65	68		13
Marjo Selin, Finland	36	31	32	29	6
Cory Everson, U.S.A.	5	5	5	5	1
Gundi Froeder, Germany	80	80	76		16

== See also ==
- 1987 Mr. Olympia
