= 1986 Ms. Olympia =

IFBB professional bodybuilding competition

- Promotion: IFBB
- Date: November 19, 1986
- Venue: Felt Forum
- City: New York City, New York, United States

Event chronology
1985 Ms. Olympia	1986 Ms. Olympia	1987 Ms. Olympia

The 1986 Ms. Olympia contest was an IFBB professional bodybuilding competition was held on November 19, 1986, at the Felt Forum in Madison Square Garden in New York City, New York. It was the 7th Ms. Olympia competition held.

== Prize money ==
- 1st - $20,000
- 2nd - $10,000
- 3rd - $5,000
- 4th - $4,000
- 5th - $3,500
- 6th - $2,000
- 7th - $1,750
- 8th - $1,500
- 9th - $1,250
- 10th - $1,000

Total: $50,000

== Rounds ==
- Round 1 (Symmetry Round): Judging the balance and proportion.
- Round 2 (Muscularity Round): Focused on muscle size and definition.
- Round 3 (Compulsory Poses Round): Contestants performed mandatory poses to highlight their muscle groups.
- Round 4 (Posing Routine Round): A choreographed routine to music, emphasizing presentation skills.

== Result ==
- 1st - Cory Everson, U.S.A.
- 2nd - Clare Furr, U.S.A.
- 3rd - Ellen Van Maris, Netherlands
- 4th - Diana Dennis, U.S.A.
- 5th - Mary Roberts, U.S.A.
- 6th - Juliette Bergmann, Netherlands
- 7th - Sue Ann McKean, U.S.A.
- 8th - Janice Ragain, U.S.A.
- 9th - Carla Dunlap, U.S.A.
- 10th - Bev Francis, Australia/U.S.A.
- 11th - Erika Geisen, Australia
- 12th - Marjo Selin, Finland
- 13th - Dawn Marie Gnaegi, Switzerland
- 14th - Susie Jaso, U.S.A.
- 15th - Penny Price, U.S.A.
- 16th - Dominique Darde, France
- 17th - Dona Oliveira, U.S.A.

=== Scorecard ===
Contestant, Country (In order of appearance)	Round 1	Round 2	Round 3	Pose- down	Total Score	Final Place
Juliette Bergmann, Netherlands	32	29	31	30	122	6
Erika Geisen, Australia	53	50	55			11
Dawn Marie Gnaegi, Switzerland	65	70	65			13
Clare Furr, U.S.A.	10	10	12	10	42	2
Sue Ann McKean, U.S.A.	35	38	35			7
Ellen Van Maris, Netherlands	21	16	13	15	65	3
Diana Dennis, U.S.A.	16	21	20	20	77	4
Mary Roberts, U.S.A.	23	25	25	25	98	5
Bev Francis, Australia/U.S.A.	52	49	49			10
Susie Jaso, U.S.A.	75	70	71			14
Janice Ragain, U.S.A.	38	37	39			8
Penny Price, U.S.A.	75	73	77			15
Carla Dunlap, U.S.A.	45	54	46			9
Marjo Selin, Finland	58	56	58			12
Cory Everson, U.S.A.	5	5	5	5	20	1

== See also ==
- 1986 Mr. Olympia
