= 1988 Ms. Olympia =

Women's professional bodybuilding competition

- Promotion: IFBB
- Date: 1988
- City: New York City, New York, United States

Event chronology
1987 Ms. Olympia	1988 Ms. Olympia	1989 Ms. Olympia

The 1988 Ms. Olympia contest was an IFBB professional bodybuilding competition held in 1988 in New York City, New York. It was the 9th Ms. Olympia competition held.

== Prize money ==
- 1st - $25,000
- 2nd - $12,000
- 3rd - $7,000
- 4th - $5,000
- 5th - $3,000
- 6th - $2,500

== Rounds ==
- Round 1 (Symmetry Round): Judging the overall balance and proportion of the contestants' physiques.
- Round 2 (Muscularity Round): Focused on muscle size and definition.
- Round 3 (Compulsory Poses Round): Required specific poses to highlight muscle groups.
- Round 4 (Posing Routine Round): A choreographed posing routine to music, emphasizing creativity and presentation.

== Results ==
Place	Prize	Name
1		(United States) Cory Everson
2		(West Germany) Anja Langer
3		(Australia) Bev Francis
4		(Netherlands) Ellen Van Maris
5		(Finland) Marjo Selin
6		(United States) Dona Oliveira
7		(United States) Janet Tech
8		(West Germany) Renate Holland
9		(United States) Carla Dunlap
10		(United States) Laura Creavalle
11		(United States) Renee Casella
12		(Netherlands) Juliette Bergmann
13		(United States) Janice Ragain
14		(Canada) Joy Nichols
15		(United States) Cathey Palyo
16		(Sweden) Veronica Dahlen
DQ		(United States) Tonya Knight

=== Scorecard ===
Contestant Country (In order of appearance)	Round 1	Round 2	Round 3	Pose Down	Final Place
Bev Francis, Australia/U.S.A.	18	16	18	17	3
Anja Langer, West Germany	10	12	10	10	2
Renate Holland, West Germany	48	44	44		
Marjo Selin, Finland	27	30	30	30	6
Renee Casella, U.S.A.	64	49	59		
Cory Everson, U.S.A.	5	5	5	5	1
Laura Creavalle, Canada	68	51	55		
Joy Nichols, Canada	74	75	70		
Tonya Knight, U.S.A.	18	21	19	21	4
Cathy Palyo, U.S.A.	80	81	80		
Ellen Van Maris, Netherlands	12	8	11	40	2
Janice Ragain, U.S.A.	58	67	69		
Veronique Dahlin, Sweden	84	84	85		
Juliette Bergman, Netherlands	48	66	67		
Dona Oliviera, U.S.A.	33	43	43		
Carla Dunlap, U.S.A.	59	59	51		
Janet Tech, U.S.A.	39	42	41		

== Notable events ==
- The song played during the posedown was Wild Side by Mötley Crüe

== See also ==
- 1988 Mr. Olympia
