= 1984 Ms. Olympia =

Women's professional bodybuilding competition

- Promotion: IFBB
- Date: November 24, 1984
- Venue: Place des Arts
- City: Montreal, Quebec, Canada

Event chronology
1983 Ms. Olympia	1984 Ms. Olympia	1985 Ms. Olympia

The 1984 Ms. Olympia contest was an IFBB professional bodybuilding competition was held on November 24, 1984, at the Place des Arts in Montreal, Quebec. It was the 5th Ms. Olympia competition held.

== Prize money ==
- 6th - $1,200

== Rounds ==
- Round 1 (Symmetry Round): Judging the balance and proportion of contestants' physiques.
- Round 2 (Muscularity Round): Focused on muscle size and definition.
- Round 3 (Compulsory Poses Round): Contestants performed specific mandatory poses to highlight their muscle groups.
- Round 4 (Posing Routine Round): A choreographed routine to music, allowing contestants presentation and artistic expression.

== Results ==
Place	Prize	Name
1		(United States) Cory Everson
2		(United States) Rachel McLish
3		(United States) Mary Roberts
4		(United States) Carla Dunlap
5		(Canada) Carla Temple
6		(United States) Clare Furr
7		(United States) Gladys Portugues
8		(United States) Lynn Conkwright
9		(Netherlands) Ellen Van Maris
10		(United States) Dinah Anderson
11		(United States) Tina Plakinger
12		(Netherlands) Erika Mes
13		(United States) Candy Csencsits
14		(Finland) Marjo Selin
15		(Sweden) Inger Zetterqvist
16		(United States) Kay Baxter
16		(United States) Susan Roberts
16		(United Kingdom) Carolyn Cheshire
16		(Denmark) Lisser Frost-Larsen
16		(Canada) Holly Buss
16		(France) Josee Baumgartner
16		(Sweden) Carina Johansson
16		(Canada) Joy Nichols
16		(United States) Lydia Cheng

== Notable events ==
- The first time the contest was held outside the United States.
- Erika Mes, at 102 lb (46 kg), was the lightest Ms. Olympia competitor to compete.

== See also ==
- 1984 Mr. Olympia
