= 1989 Ms. Olympia =

Women's professional bodybuilding competition

- Promotion: IFBB
- Date: 1989
- City: New York City, New York, United States

Event chronology
1988 Ms. Olympia	1989 Ms. Olympia	1990 Ms. Olympia

The 1989 Ms. Olympia contest was an IFBB professional bodybuilding competition was held in 1989 in New York City, New York. It was the 10th Ms. Olympia competition held.

== Prize money ==
- 1st - $27,000
- 2nd - $15,000
- 3rd - $10,000
- 4th - $5,000
- 5th - $4,000
- 6th - $3,000
- 7th - $2,500
- 8th - $2,000
- 9th - $1,500
- 10th - $1,000

Total: $71,000

== Rounds ==
- Round 1 (Symmetry Round): Judging the overall balance and proportion of the contestants' physiques.
- Round 2 (Muscularity Round): Focused on muscle size and definition.
- Round 3 (Compulsory Poses Round): Contestants performed mandatory poses to showcase key muscle groups.
- Round 4 (Posing Routine Round): A choreographed posing routine to music, where contestants highlighted their physique and presentation skills creatively.

== Results ==
Place	Prize	Name
1		(United States) Cory Everson
2		(United States) Sandy Riddell
3		(Australia) Bev Francis
4		(United States) Jackie Paisley
4		(Netherlands) Ellen Van Maris
6		(United States) Laura Creavalle
7		(United States) Diana Dennis
8		(Finland) Marjo Selin
9		(France) Marie Laure Mahabir
10		(United States) Janet Tech
11		(Italy) Claudia Profanter
12		(United States) Dona Oliveira
13		(United States) Laura Beaudry
14		(United States) Dorothy Herndon
15		(United States) Lisa Lorio
16		(Canada) Lynn Lemieux
17		(West Germany) Renate Holland
18		(Netherlands) Ina Lopulissa

=== Scorecard ===
Contestant Country (In order of appearance)	Round 1	Round 2	Round 3	Pose Down	Final Place
Marjo Selin, Finland	40	43	42	125	8
Ina Lopulissa, Holland	90	89	90	269	18
Ellen Van Maris, Holland	19	28	28	101	5
Lisa Lorio, USA	65	72	72	209	15
Laura Beaudry, USA	72	66	52	190	13
Dorothy Herdon, USA	69	68	67	204	14
Renata Holland, Germany	84	83	85	252	17
Marie Mahabir, France	52	45	49	146	9
Laura Creavalle, Canada	39	21	24	109	6
Claudia Profanter, Italy	61	47	50	158	11
Sandy Riddell, USA	12	8	11	40	2
Dona Oliveira, USA	53	56	57	166	12
Diana Dennis, USA	30	36	35	101	7
Janet Tech, USA	46	58	52	156	10
Cory Everson, USA	5	12	10	37	1
Lynn Lemieux, Canada	80	80	80	240	16
Jackie Paisley, USA	25	26	24	99	4
Bev Francis, USA	14	9	11	46	3

== See also ==
- 1989 Mr. Olympia
