= Kay Baxter =

American bodybuilder (1945–1988)

- Professional bodybuilder

Personal info
- Born: October 3, 1945; Monroe County, Ohio, U.S.
- Died: May 16, 1988 (aged 42); Los Angeles, California, U.S.

Best statistics

Professional (Pro) career
- Pro-debut: NPC Gold's Classic; 1979
- Best win: 1981 NPC Gold's Classic Champion; 1981
- Active: Unofficially Retired in 1986

Kay Baxter (October 3, 1945 – May 16, 1988) was a pioneer female bodybuilder.

== Bodybuilding ==
Baxter competed in women's bodybuilding from 1979 to 1986, competing in four IFBB Ms. Olympia competitions between 1982 and 1985. She was inspirational for many up-and-coming female bodybuilders, especially those who desired a physique that would be large and muscular even by bodybuilding standards. She was a groundbreaker in making wrestling videos and short action movies that catered to fans of women's bodybuilding. Many believed that Baxter was the female bodybuilder in the 1985 Billboard top 3 song "California Girls", by David Lee Roth whom she trained at Gold's Gym in Venice, CA, but this was actually Teagan Clive.

The early female bodybuilders already had been groundbreakers, as they had been muscular athletes, usually in track or gymnastics, at a time when neither muscularity nor sports were encouraged for young girls. Baxter had been a collegiate gymnast at Kent State University and was still quite well muscled when taking up bodybuilding in her mid-30s. She competed in some of the earliest prominent women's bodybuilding contests. The first major mainstream article on the sport, "Here She Is, Miss, Well, What?" in the March 17, 1980 Sports Illustrated opened with full page shots of Cammie Lusko and Baxter doing rear double biceps shots. A full-body shot of Baxter doing a front double biceps pose was on the inside page. At the time, Baxter weighed around 120 lbs for contests at a height of 5'3".

In 1982, Muscle & Fitness ran a three-page photo feature on different types of female bodybuilding physiques—Shelly Gruwell with the long, lean physique most like a model; Rachel McLish epitomizing the muscular, average framed woman; Baxter with the more muscular than average (for a bodybuilder) but still graceful build (she was posed with right leg extended, squatting on the left leg); 5-1 Mary Roberts with the short, thick, powerful build. Yet even as that issue hit the stands, Baxter was training with legendary male bodybuilder Don "The Ripper" Ross with the goal of redefining the outer limits of female bodybuilder muscularity. She later admitted to taking some steroids during this period. She and Ross expected at the 1982 Ms. Olympia, she would finish either first or last.

Baxter's clothed entrance into the host hotel lobby at that Olympia has become legendary among longtime bodybuilding fans. Reg Bradford, in his contest coverage for BodyPower magazine, called her "massive with a capital M" and declared it was apparent "Lindsay Wagner had been imitating The Bionic Woman on television" for here was a true superwoman in the flesh. In a posthumous interview published by Female Bodybuilding and Weight Training, Baxter claimed a competitor came up to her in tears, saying, "That's not what a female bodybuilder should look like!" Muscle & Fitness' contest coverage estimated Baxter gained 8 pounds of muscle, an amazing amount back then for a 5-3 female bodybuilder. As a matter of fact, Baxter weighed in at 129. By modern standards, she would be a good-sized light heavyweight in a class competition. Back then, only Carla Dunlap rivaled Baxter's combination of size and definition. The Women's Physique Publication reported that the IFBB circulated a memo among the judges, admonishing them not to reward "uncontrolled muscularity." Baxter would finish eighth, but immediately gained a devoted legion of followers among fans and more than a few competitors.

Baxter also understood that one of the things that drew bodybuilding fans to the sport/activity were the physiques of seemingly superhuman size, seeming to symbolize superhuman strength and will. Superhero comic books had been filled with bodybuilding ads since the 1960s. She figured women's bodybuilding fans were no different and she herself declared to Muscle & Fitness in 1983 "I want to be superwoman!" She made a wrestling video with her taking on another of bodybuilding's most muscular women, Pillow, and in an interview published posthumously by Flex Magazine, stated she liked it because they "looked like two superwomen fighting." In the just dawning age of common VCR usage, Baxter sold tapes of her wrestling Pillow or men. (Bodybuilding world gossip has it that Baxter was such a physical woman, she'd playfully put friends in leg scissors to see if they could escape or last before giving up).

Though judges continued to place her lower and lower at subsequent Olympias and Women's World Championships, Baxter continued to get bigger, denser and even more defined. In one of the posthumous interviews, she said, "The judges weren't the ones buying my videos" so she might as well keep pleasing herself and the fans. It's been theorized that fear of those videos reaching mainstream media and making women's bodybuilding, then struggling for mainstream acceptance much more than even today, something practiced by women the average person couldn't relate to at all also was behind the low contest placings that kept Baxter out of the mainstream. The low point for Baxter in this regard probably was the 1984 Ms. Olympia, when she wasn't placed in the top 15 during prejudging and, therefore, couldn't compete in the night show. Several competitors told Women's Physique World and other magazines they were shocked by this placing and felt bad for Kay, who was competing at 138-140 pounds by this point at a size that would be huge by standards of 10 years hence.

Still, her fans loved her with a devotion no other female bodybuilder could claim. She was voted "The Best Woman Bodybuilder in the World" by readers of the Women's Physique Publication, a mail-order only magazine whose readers and editors tended to favor the more heavily muscled bodybuilders, each year from 1982 to 1984. Women's Physique World, a color newsstand sister to WPP that began in 1984, featured her on their first Back Page (a shot of a female bodybuilder from the back) and made her the coverwoman of an issue that devoted a few articles to her. Strength Training for Beauty, a magazine aimed at bodybuilders and fans who appreciated both muscle and sexy attire/makeup, had Baxter in several issues.

In the first WPP announcing she had been voted "Best Bodybuilder in the World," Baxter wondered if bodybuilding needed to be split into two contests—a more mainstream-palatable level of bodybuilding and Ultimate Bodybuilding, which would reward high levels of denied size. Several years later, as fitness contests featuring muscular women less muscular than bodybuilders and doing routines that featured more dancing than look-at-my-muscles posing, Baxter seemed a prophet.

From 1982 to 1985, Baxter was the benchmark for hugely muscled female bodybuilders. The 1985 Worlds, however, was the last competition at which fans would marvel at the awesomeness of her physique, while judges would bury her in the results. The latter still happened, not so much the former. The bar was moving in women's bodybuilding as bigger girls such as 5–7, 145-pound Deanna Panting, 5–4, 145-pound Hannie Van Aken and 5-5, 155-pound Peggy Ouwerling were taking the "Big Girl" baton from Kay, whose influence they often acknowledged.

"Someone had to stick her neck out for the cause of muscular women … and I've got no regrets about that... not one", she said. One of her catchphrases was "Get built without guilt".

== Personal life ==
She was married to Bill Wick, a videographer who specialised in Muscle worship, until her death.

== Death ==
Baxter died in a car crash in 1988. Police said Baxter was driving on the wrong side of the road when she swerved to avoid hitting an oncoming motorcycle and her car flipped. Neil Axe, 23, of Gardena, who was with Baxter, suffered only minor injuries. Before her death, she was moving towards acting.

=== Legacy ===
The Women's Extravaganza, an event that featured a bodybuilding contest and a strength competition, was renamed for her in 1990.

She was inducted into the IFBB Hall of Fame in 2001.

== Contest history ==
- 1979 US Women's Championship - 1st
- 1980 NPC Nationals - 4th
- 1980 NPC USA Championships - 4th
- 1981 NPC Gold's Classic - 1st
- 1981 World Games I - 5th (MW)
- 1981 IFBB Grand Prix Montreal - 3rd
- 1981 IFBB Pro World Championships - 2nd
- 1982 IFBB Ms. Olympia - 8th
- 1982 IFBB Pro World Championships - 9th
- 1983 IFBB Ms. Olympia - 10th
- 1983 IFBB Pro World Championships - 10th
- 1984 IFBB Ms. Olympia - did not place
- 1984 IFBB Pro World Championships - 14th
- 1985 IFBB Ms. Olympia - 13th
- 1985 IFBB Pro World Championships - 10th
- 1986 IFBB Ms. International - 15th
- 1986 IFBB Los Angeles Pro Championships - 9th
