= Darcy LaPier =

American actress and model

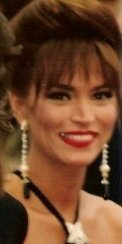
- LaPier in 1993
- Education: Portland State University; University of Oregon
- Occupations: Actress; model
- Years active: 1989–1999
- Spouses: Ron Rice; Jean-Claude Van Damme; Mark R. Hughes (m. 1999; died 2000)
- Children: 3

Darcy LaPier (born July 9, 1965) is an American former actress and model.

== Early life ==
LaPier is a native of Montana. She graduated from Portland State University. She also studied drama at the University of Oregon and Huntington Film Institute in Florida.

== Personal life ==
She met and fell in love with actor Jean-Claude Van Damme, who was married to bodybuilder Gladys Portugues at the time. She later married a then-divorced Van Damme, and they had a child. Van Damme and Portugues had a son, and they later remarried after he and LaPier divorced.

On Valentine's Day 1999, LaPier married Mark R. Hughes, founder of Herbalife, at Beverly Hills Presbyterian Church. The wedding was attended by many of Herbalife's top distributors, and was broadcast on HBN (Herbalife Broadcast Network) to distributors worldwide. Hughes died of a combined alcohol and drug overdose on May 21 the following year.

She was also married to "Hawaiian Tropic suntan lotion magnate" Ron Rice.

== Filmography ==
Film
Year	Film	Role	Notes
1989	Think Big	Donna	Film Debut
1990	Dream Trap	Unknown Role	Extra
1991	Driving Me Crazy	Girl with Taj	
1992	Double Trouble	David's Neighbor	
1994	Street Fighter	Guile's Date	Guile played by husband Jean-Claude Van Damme. Filmed in Bangkok where they married. Several months later, while LaPier was pregnant with their child, Van Damme had an affair with their co-actor Kylie Minogue.
1999	Operation Delta Force 3: Clear Target	Ariana	
