= Jean-Claude Van Damme: Behind Closed Doors =

British reality television show

- Genre: Reality television
- Starring: Jean-Claude Van Damme; Kristopher Van Varenberg; Bianca Bree; Gladys Portugues
- Narrated by: Jason Flemyng
- Country of origin: United Kingdom
- Original language: English
- No. of series: 1
- No. of episodes: 8

Production
- Running time: 43–44 minutes

Original release
- Network: ITV4
- Release: 22 March – 10 May 2011

Jean-Claude Van Damme: Behind Closed Doors is a 2011 British reality show, in the fly on the wall style, featuring action star Jean-Claude Van Damme. It aired on ITV4 in the United Kingdom.

== Plot ==
The documentary presents insights into the professional, family, and home life of kickboxer and action star Jean-Claude Van Damme. He is preparing for a kickboxing fight for the first time since 1982 and also takes the audience behind the scenes of his latest movies.

== Episodes ==
No.	Title	Directed by	Original release date
1	"Lucky"	Jared Wright & Maia Lidell	22 March 2011
The man known as "The Muscles from Brussels" at home with his family and behind the scenes on film locations. He makes a trip to the church where he had an epiphany as a child. He travels to Russia to play the part of Napoleon in a Russian film only to get a bit more than he bargained for. He saves a near-dead stray dog he finds in the road in Romania.
2	"Birthday"	Jared Wright & Maia Lidell	29 March 2011
Jean-Claude celebrates his 50th birthday by reflecting on his life and career. We join his wife Gladys who also takes a trip down memory lane as she revisits their first house in LA when her husband's career first took off. Later she calls in at the cafe where they had their first date. Jean-Claude goes to Belgium to record a TV show called "Il était une fois Jean-Claude Van Damme" for the channel RTL-TVI that celebrates his 50th birthday. He goes to Paris where he takes part in an interview for Fun Radio and gets backstage access to the famous Moulin Rouge club. He flies back to Ukraine where he meets his old friend Alexander, goes in a shooting club, and buys caviar.
3	"Dubai"	Jared Wright	5 April 2011
Jean-Claude plans a Rocky-style comeback in the kickboxing ring against Olympic champion Somluck Kamsing. As a fifty-year old, Jean Claude needs to return to peak fitness. He returns to Belgium to rejoin Claude Goetz, his old trainer from his younger days who made him "the Muscles from Brussels." It's an emotional reunion but it also brings home the enormity of the task both mentally and physically. We follow JC to Dubai where he tries some watersports and claims that he had been blacklisted in Hollywood since 1994 after refusing a $36 million offer from Universal Studios because he was wasted. It also touches on his love for his dogs along with plans to build them a very special "dog house" luxury paradise.
4	"Attila"	Jared Wright & Maia Lidell	12 April 2011
We watch Jean-Claude on the set of the movie Weapon. Things go wrong during the rehearsals for a fight scene when some over-enthusiastic punches leave his co-star in trouble. Jean-Claude makes a trip to Ukraine for a guest appearance at a charity fashion show. A friend of Jean-Claude's in Ukraine also organises a belated 50th birthday party for him with popstar Inna, where the action hero gets caught up in the middle of a frenzied media storm. Eventually, the barrage of attention pushes him to the edge.
5	"Road Trip"	Unknown	19 April 2011
It's Christmas Van Damme-style as the family gets together to celebrate at home. Daughter Bianca brings her boyfriend Eddy to meet her dad for the first time - seemingly a terrifying experience for the lad. Jean-Claude decides this will be a Christmas Eddy will never forget as the pair head straight for the gym. Later on, he challenges Eddy to a fight just to complete the festivities with a bang. We join Jean-Claude on the set of a film in Louisiana where a fight scene goes horribly wrong and the paramedics have to be called.
6	"Hong Kong"	Jared Wright	26 April 2011
Jean-Claude goes on an emotional rollercoaster, losing his temper and breaking down in tears after being rejected for a movie role. Things get brighter as he attends an old friend's (Alex Van Damme, the son of the man from whom JCVD took his surname) party in Hong Kong, and attempts an unorthodox hole-in-one in golf. He then takes us back to the emotional moment when he first set eyes on Gladys, his body-builder wife.
7	"Booder"	Jared Wright	3 May 2011
Jean-Claude talks with some regret about his past, turbulent lifestyle. He has a discussion with son Kris warning him about the temptations of Hollywood. He appears in the comedy movie Beur sur la ville along with a star-struck cast, but he has not had enough time to learn his lines. He goes to Bucharest to film an advert for Gillette's TV campaign. Later on, in Vancouver for the filming of Kung Fu Panda 2, he gets stuck in the elevator on the 41st floor and there is only one way down.
8	"Ceremony"	Jared Wright	10 May 2011
Jean-Claude is invited to present an award live on Belgian television. But 30 years of gunfire and explosions on movie sets have taken their toll on his hearing and things go wrong. The pressure is on for daughter Bianca as she auditions for a part in a martial arts movie. In Los Angeles, Jean-Claude's son Kris has arranged a family meal at a restaurant in Chinatown and has secretly invited a Hollywood star to surprise his father.

== Home media ==
The show was released as a two-disc set on 16 May 2011.
