= Monaco Forever =

- Promotional release poster
- Directed by: William A. Levey
- Written by: William A. Levey; C. William Pitt
- Produced by: William A. Levey; Jacques Tremeau; Elaine Young
- Starring: Charles Pitt
- Cinematography: Daryn Okada
- Edited by: William A. Levey
- Music by: Issac Porter
- Release date: 1984
- Running time: 48 min.
- Country: United States
- Language: English

Monaco Forever is a 1984 American film directed by William A. Levey and starring Charles Pitt as an American jewel thief in Monaco. Michael (Pitt) is trying to set up a robbery of a jewel store, and runs into various characters along the way.

The film runs 48 minutes and is most notable for the first (although brief) appearance of Jean-Claude Van Damme as a character credited as "Gay Karate Man".
