= Mark R. Hughes =

American entrepreneur (1956–2000)

- Born: Mark Reynolds Hughes; January 1, 1956; La Mirada, California, U.S.
- Died: May 21, 2000 (aged 44); Malibu, California, U.S.
- Occupation: Entrepreneur
- Spouses: Kathryn Whiting (m. 1979; div. 1984) Angela Mack (m. 1984; div. 1987) Suzan Schroder (m. 1987; div. 1997) Darcy LaPier (m. 1999)

Mark R. Hughes (January 1, 1956 – May 21, 2000) was an American entrepreneur who was the founder, chairman, and CEO of Herbalife, a multi-level marketing company.

== Early life and education ==
Hughes was born in La Mirada, California, on January 1, 1956, the son of Stuard Hartman and Jo Ann Hughes. His parents divorced in 1970, when Mark was 14, and his mother retained custody of Mark.

At this point, the family survived on welfare payments with Hughes' mother suffering from mental health issues. She attempted to treat obesity and tension with amphetamines and sleeping pills. In the ninth grade, Hughes dropped out of school and began using drugs himself. He has self-described as "a little delinquent" during the time period.

At 16, Hughes attended CEDU High School, a private residential school for troubled youngsters in Running Springs, California, whose origins were associated with Synanon, a group founded in 1958 and later described as a cult. Part of Hughes' CEDU rehabilitation program required him to raise money by selling raffle tickets. Hughes subsequently became the school's best salesman.

Hughes was 19 years old and still working for CEDU when his mother died in her apartment of a drug overdose on April 27, 1975.

== Career ==
Hughes began his career in 1976 at Seyforth Laboratories selling diet products. He spent three years there and was listed as one of the company's top 100 earners.

In 1979, after Seyforth Laboratories shut down, he joined Golden Youth, a direct-sales outfit that sells exercise equipment and weight-control products. When Golden Youth went out of business, Hughes decided to start his own operation.

In February 1980, aged 24, Hughes founded Los Angeles-based Herbalife International. It has since become one of the world's largest distributors of Herbalife products through multi-level marketing, with sales of about $3.5 billion in 2007 and 2.1 million independent distributors. Active in 95 countries and achieving record retail sales of $7.5 billion in 2013 according to company statements.

== False health claims lawsuit ==
In the mid-1980s, Hughes was sued by the Food and Drug Administration, the California attorney general's office, and the state Department of Health, over what they said were false health claims about Herbalife products and the various schemes used to market them. Health agencies accused the company of violating labeling standards and using improper sales practices.

Regulators contended that the company was making medicinal claims. Medicines are regulated by the F.D.A., while nutritional supplements are not. Some health experts doubted the efficacy of Herbalife products, saying that in some instances they relied too heavily on laxatives and caffeine.

In March 1985, the California attorney general and the state Department of Health Services charged Hughes and Herbalife with making "untrue or misleading" product claims—primarily involving the caffeine content of some Herbalife products—and operating an "endless chain marketing scheme."

Prompted by complaints alleging that Herbalife product users had suffered illness and death, a U.S. Senate subcommittee called Hughes before a hearing in May. Referring to a panel of nutrition experts who had criticized Herbalife in testimony the previous day, he asked the senators, "If they're such experts in weight loss, why were they so fat?"

During the hearing, Hughes was questioned on his lack of formal education and qualifications to make health claims that dispute those of leading medical experts. He subsequently settled with the regulatory agencies in 1986 and was ordered to pay $850,000. At the time, the California attorney general, John Van De Kamp, was quoted in The Wall Street Journal as saying it was the "largest settlement ever attained from a health products company."

== Philanthropy ==
Mark and Suzan established the Herbalife Family Foundation (HFF) in 1994, a non-profit organization dedicated to improving vulnerable children's lives through helping charity organizations meet the nutritional needs of children at risk, and providing funds to organizations that assist victims of natural disasters. The Herbalife Family Foundation has also provided scholarships and grants for health research.

== Personal life ==
In 1979, Hughes met Kathryn Whiting, a former Miss Santa Monica, who would become his first wife. They divorced in 1984 and in the same year, he married Angela Mack, a Swedish former beauty queen.

In September 1987, Hughes married Suzan Schroder, a former actress, court reporter and Miss Petite U.S.A. In December 1991, the couple welcomed a son, Alexander Reynolds "Alex" Hughes. Suzan filed for divorce from Hughes in September 1997.

In February 1999, Hughes married Darcy LaPier, an American actress and model. Their marriage continued until his death the following year on May 21, 2000, at his home in Malibu, California.

Scott Carrier, of the Los Angeles County Coroner's Office, said final autopsy results found that Hughes, 44, had ingested a toxic combination of alcohol and doxepin, an antidepressant he was taking to help him sleep. His blood-alcohol level was measured at 0.21.

Hughes' then 9-year-old son, Alexander "Alex" Hughes, was named sole beneficiary of his father's estate, estimated to be worth $400 million. Hughes's will stipulated that, until Alex turns 35, the bulk of his inheritance would be held in a trust managed by Jack Reynolds (Alex's paternal grandfather), attorney Conrad Klein, and Herbalife executive Christopher Pair. In 2006, the Los Angeles Superior Court ruled to remove Reynolds from supervising a $35 million custodianship after finding that he violated multiple probate laws by ceding control to Klein and commingling Alex's personal assets with partnership accounts. Reynolds was suspended, but remained one of three trustees until 2013, when a judge in a separate lawsuit ordered the removal of all three for breaching the terms of the Trust by mismanaging the funds. After the removal, Alex chose Fidelity Investments to oversee the fund – a decision that was later reversed in a California Court of Appeal.
