= Pumping Iron II: The Women =

1985 film by George Butler

- Directed by: George Butler
- Written by: George Butler; Charles Gaines
- Produced by: George Butler
- Starring: Bev Francis; Rachel McLish; Steve Michalik
- Music by: David McHugh; Michael Montes
- Production company: White Mountain Films
- Distributed by: Cinecom Pictures
- Release date: May 3, 1985
- Running time: 107 minutes
- Country: United States
- Language: English

Pumping Iron II: The Women is a 1985 documentary film directed by George Butler about female bodybuilding. The film follows four women as they prepare for and compete in a bodybuilding competition. It is a follow-up to Butler's 1977 documentary Pumping Iron, which centered on a male bodybuilding competition, and notably introduced Arnold Schwarzenegger to a wide audience.

The film's central drama concerns the participation of Australian powerlifter Bev Francis who is unusually muscular even by the standards of female bodybuilders, sparking debates about the importance and definition of "femininity" in female bodybuilding.

== Synopsis ==
The film centers on four female bodybuilders competing in the 1983 Caesars World Cup, held at the Caesars Palace hotel and casino in Las Vegas:

- Bev Francis, an Australian powerlifter transitioning to bodybuilding, noted for her extreme muscular development compared to other competitors.
- Rachel McLish, a two-time Ms. Olympia winner and prominent figure within the sport.
- Lori Bowen, a novice bodybuilder from Texas who admires McLish.
- Carla Dunlap, a former synchronized swimmer and experienced competitor.

The film begins in the weeks leading up to the competition, observing the women as they train and discuss the contest with their coaches, families, and friends. In the lead-up to the competition, Bev Francis travels to the United States to be trained by 1972 AAU Mr. America, Steve Michalik (who later guest poses during a break in the competition).

A major tension explored through the film is how and whether the competitors should be judged on their "femininity", in addition to their muscular development. Controversially, powerlifter Bev Francis has muscular development which is unprecedented in the world of female bodybuilding. Some competitors and judges applaud her achievement, while others find it excessive and believe that it compromises her femininity. McLish, who has a more conventionally feminine appearance and has enjoyed a very successful bodybuilding career, is positioned as a foil to Francis. In a key moment, the filmmakers show a meeting of the judges before the competition in which they unsuccessfully attempt to elucidate their official position on the role of femininity in their judging.

During the competition, hosted by celebrity journalist George Plimpton, the film captures the athletes posing on stage, the audience's and judges' reactions, and backstage moments, including the judges' deliberations. Ultimately, out of 15 competitors, Bev Francis places eighth—eliciting boos from the crowd—Rachel McLish finishes third, and Carla Dunlap wins first place.

After the competition, the competitors celebrate backstage over ice cream. The camera captures the reactions of the competitors and their supporters to the results, ending with a scene in the hotel room of Bev Francis. Francis appears equanimous, but her supporters express outrage at the judges' decision. The film ends with one of Francis's trainers expressing his bafflement directly to the camera, rhetorically asking what the higher ranked competitors had over Francis: "Explain it to me. Explain it to me. Explain it to me."

== Background and production ==
Pumping Iron II was made as a follow-up to the groundbreaking 1977 film Pumping Iron.

The film avoids devices typical of the documentary genre such as direct-to-camera interviews or narration, instead adopting a more dramatic style. Critics and commentators have pointed out that some scenes appear staged or unnatural. Director George Butler referred to the film as a "semi documentary".

The Caesars World Cup was a contest created specifically for the film. The competitors were a mix of professional and amateur bodybuilders, which was actually a violation of IFBB rules. Charles Gaines, one of the writers of the film, was included on the contest's judging panel. He was interviewed for the film but not identified, and had never previously seen a female bodybuilding contest.

A scene in which Bev Francis and Rachel McLish perform duelling poses in front of the judges was contrived by the filmmakers to play up the apparent rivalry between the two women. Francis had been eliminated from the competition before the "pose down" phase, but the filmmakers convinced the judges to allow her to participate for the sake of the film's narrative.

The film was based on the book Pumping Iron II: The Unprecedented Woman.

== Distribution ==
The film was released on DVD April 8, 2003 by distributor Central Park Media. The DVD is currently out of print, as the distributor went bankrupt in April 2009, subsequently having to close for the foreseeable future.
