= Jean-Claude Van Damme =

Belgian actor and martial artist (born 1960)

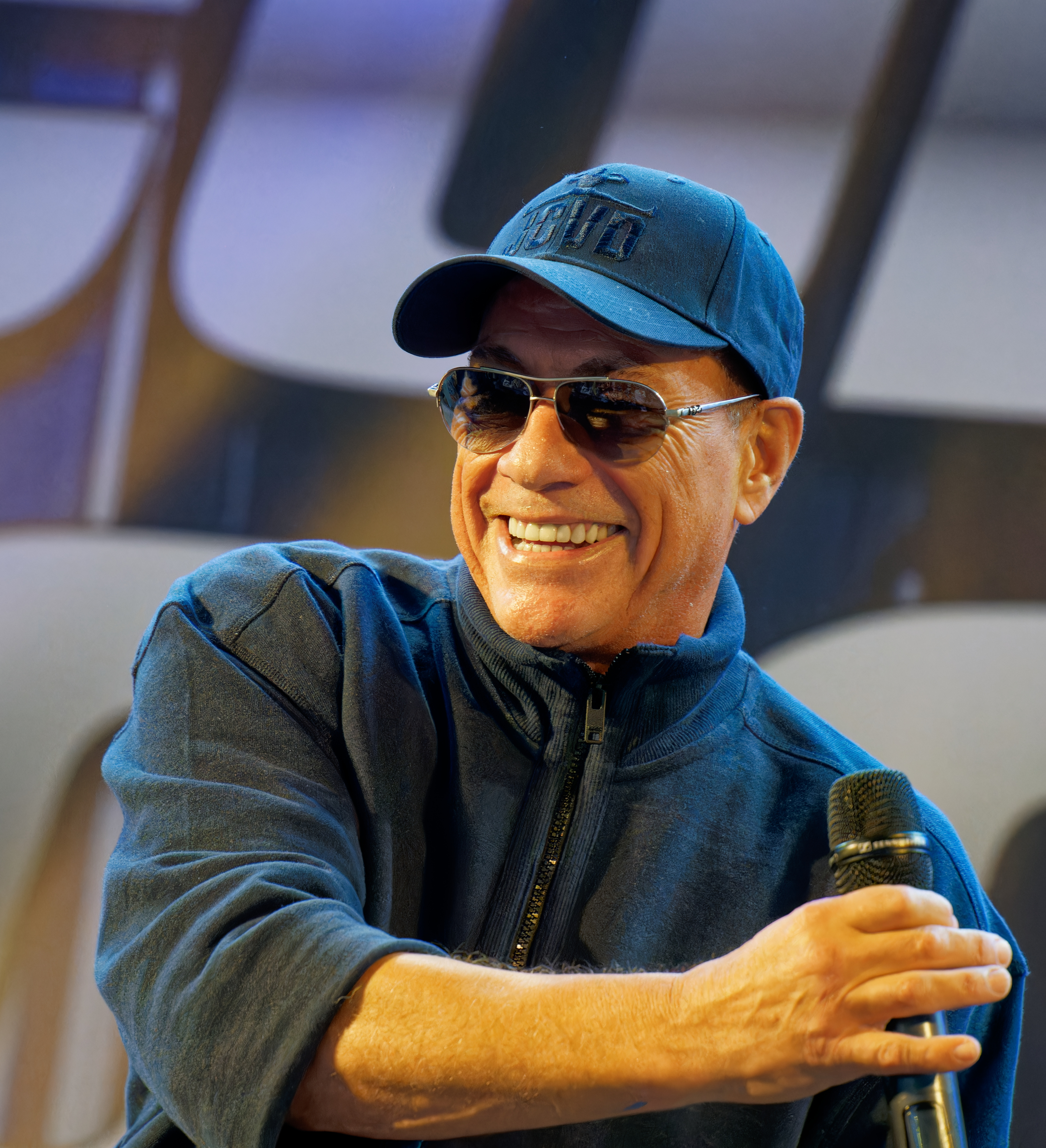
- Van Damme in 2023
- Born: Jean-Claude Camille François Van Varenberg; 18 October 1960 (age 66); Berchem-Sainte-Agathe, Brussels-Capital, Belgium
- Division: Middleweight
- Style: Karate; Kickboxing; Muay Thai; Taekwondo
- Fighting out of: Brussels, Belgium
- Team: Team Goetz
- Trainer: Claude Goetz; Dominique Valera
- Rank: 2nd Dan–Karate
- Years active: 1976–present (martial arts); 1979–present (acting)

Kickboxing record
- Total: 19
- Wins: 18
- By knockout: 18
- Losses: 1

Amateur record
- Total: 48
- Wins: 44
- Losses: 4

Other information
- Occupation: Martial artist; actor; writer; producer; conservationist
- Spouse: María Rodríguez (m. 1980; div. 1984) Cynthia Derderian (m. 1985; div. 1986) Gladys Portugues (m. 1987; div. 1992) (m. 1999) Darcy LaPier (m. 1994; div. 1997)
- Children: 3
- Website: jcvdworld.com

Signature
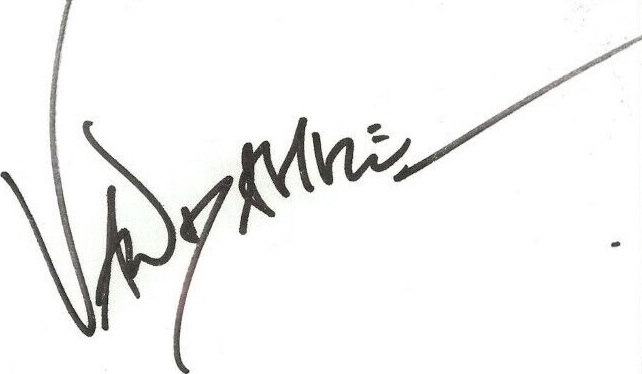

Jean-Claude Camille François Van Varenberg (Note: French pronunciation: [ʒɑ̃ klod kamij fʁɑ̃swa vɑ̃ vaʁɑ̃bɛʁɡ]; Flemish pronunciation: [vɑɱ ˈvaːrə(m)bɛr(ə)x]) (born 18 October 1960), known professionally as Jean-Claude Van Damme, (Note: French: [vɑ̃ dam]; Flemish: [vɑn ˈdɑmə]) is a Belgian martial artist and actor. Born and raised in Brussels, he was enrolled by his father in a Shotokan karate school at the age of ten, which led Van Damme to hold the rank of 2nd Dan in karate, and compete in several karate and kickboxing competitions. As a teenager, he won the middleweight championship of the European Professional Karate Association in 1979 and the Mr. Belgium bodybuilding title in 1978. With the desire of becoming an actor in Hollywood, he moved to the United States in 1982, where he worked on several films, until he got his break as the lead in the martial arts film Bloodsport (1988).

He became a popular action film star and followed up with commercially successful films such as Cyborg, Kickboxer (both 1989), Lionheart, Death Warrant (both 1990), Double Impact (1991), Universal Soldier (1992), Nowhere to Run, Hard Target (both 1993), Timecop, Street Fighter (both 1994), Sudden Death (1995), The Quest, which marked his directorial debut, and Maximum Risk (both 1996). He achieved sex symbol status in the late 1980s and early 1990s. Between 1993 and 1998, three Hong Kong filmmakers collaborated with Van Damme for their debuts in Western cinema: John Woo, Tsui Hark, and Ringo Lam. After a decline in popularity in the late 1990s and early 2000s, he returned to prominence with the critically acclaimed crime drama JCVD (2008), in which he starred as a fictional version of himself. His big return to the action genre was in The Expendables 2 (2012), in which he starred as the villain, opposite Sylvester Stallone's character.

From there on, he continued starring in action films and doing extensive voice work, appearing in the well-received Enemies Closer (2013), The Bouncer, Kickboxer: Retaliation (both 2018), Minions: The Rise of Gru (2022), and Darkness of Man (2024), among others. In television, he starred in the Ridley Scott–produced Jean-Claude Van Johnson (2016–2017). Regarded as an icon of action and martial arts cinema, his films have grossed over $3.3 billion worldwide, making him one of the most successful action stars of all time. Outside his film career, he has publicly supported various conservationist causes and animal rights organisations.

== Early life and education ==
Van Damme was born Jean-Claude Camille François Van Varenberg, on 18 October 1960, in Berchem-Sainte-Agathe, Brussels, Belgium, the son of Eliana and Eugène Van Varenberg, who was an accountant and florist. His father is from Brussels and bilingual, and his mother is Flemish (Dutch-speaking). Van Damme was brought up Roman Catholic. His paternal grandmother was Jewish.

He began martial arts at the age of ten, enrolled by his father in a Shōtōkan karate school. His styles consist of Shōtōkan karate and kickboxing. He eventually earned his black belt in karate at 18, and earned the rank of 2nd-dan black belt. He started lifting weights to improve his physique, which eventually led to a Mr. Belgium bodybuilding title in 1978. At the age of 16, he took up ballet, which he studied for five years. According to Van Damme, ballet "is an art, but it's also one of the most difficult sports. If you can survive a ballet workout, you can survive a workout in any other sport." Later he took up both Taekwondo and Muay Thai.

Among his acting heroes growing up were Charles Bronson, Bruce Lee, James Dean, Montgomery Clift, Steve McQueen, Jean-Paul Belmondo, and Sylvester Stallone.

== Career ==
=== Early 1970s to 1980: Martial arts and first film appearance ===
At the age of 12, Van Damme joined the Centre National de Karaté (National Center of Karate) under the guidance of Claude Goetz in Belgium. Van Damme trained for four years and he earned a spot on the Belgian Karate Team; he later trained in full-contact karate and kickboxing with Dominique Valera. According to Van Damme, "it was tough growing up. I was kind of geeky, and physically I was not gifted".

At the age of 15, he started his competitive karate career in Belgium. From 1976 to 1980, he compiled a record of 44 victories and four defeats in tournament and non-tournament semi-contact matches.

He was a member of the Belgium Karate Team when it won the European Karate Championship on 26 December 1979 at La Coupe François Persoons Karate Tournament in Brussels.

He placed second at the Challenge Coupe des Espoirs Karate Tournament (1st Trials). At the three-day tournament, he defeated 25 opponents before losing in the finals to teammate Angelo Spataro.

On 8 March 1980, in Brussels, Belgium, he competed against his former teammate Patrick Teugels at the Forest National Arena on the undercard of the Dan Macaruso-Dominique Valera Professional Karate Association Light-Heavyweight World Championship bout. Prior to this match, Teugels had defeated Van Damme twice by decision, including a match for the Belgium Lightweight Championship. Van Damme had a 1977 victory over Teugels. Teugels was coming off an impressive showing at the World Association of Kickboxing Organizations World Championships four months earlier, and was favored by some to win this match. According to reports, and Patrick Teugels' own interview (with photos), Teugels lost to Van Damme by TKO in the 1st round. Teugels was kicked in the nose and was unable to continue as a result. In a 2013 interview, Van Damme called this fight his most memorable match.

He began his full-contact career in 1977, when Claude Goetz promoted the first ever full-contact karate tournament in Belgium.

From 1977 to 1982, he compiled a record of 18 victories (18 knockouts) and one defeat.

In 1979, he had an uncredited role in André Delvaux's Woman Between Wolf and Dog, a Belgian-French drama film starring Marie-Christine Barrault, and Rutger Hauer.

In 1980, he caught the attention of Professional Karate Magazine publisher and editor Mike Anderson and multiple European champion Geert Lemmens. Both men tabbed Van Damme as an upcoming prospect. Van Damme retired from competition in 1982.

During his early life, he sold flowers in restaurants, and got a loan to open a gym to save some money before his move to the United States. Aptly titled California Gym, it was opened in 1979 and catered to "karate, dancing, aerobics, bodybuilding – everything". Van Damme adds that "I wrote special training programs for people, and it was a very upbeat atmosphere with music". At its peak, California Gym was making $15,000 per month; "when I decided to sell my gym my father thought I was crazy. He said, 'What the hell are you doing? You have the best gym in Brussels. You have a sports car, a beautiful apartment, you're making so much money that you can have anything you want — and now you're going to sell your business and go to America'. He was very upset".

=== 1982–1988: Early works and breakthrough ===
In 1982, he and childhood friend Michel Qissi moved to the United States in the hope of working as actors. They did a variety of jobs to support themselves. Their first job working on a film as extras in the hip hop dance film Breakin' (1984), made by Cannon Films; they are seen dancing in the background at a dance demonstration.

Around that time he developed a friendship with action martial art film star Chuck Norris. They started sparring together, and Van Damme started to work as a bouncer at a bar named Woody's Wharf, owned by Norris. He also supplemented his income as a limousine driver and private karate instructor.

He described his early days in the United States as being particularly difficult – excluding $2,000, he had placed all of his money from the sale of his gym into a European bank; thus, he struggled financially. To ensure his own emotional wellbeing, he would go for runs every night in Santa Monica. After that, he would train at the world-renowned Gold's Gym. This routine reportedly helped him survive for many years. He actively participated in casting calls and had a specific routine. On Wednesdays, he would purchase the Drama-Logue magazine; then Thursday mornings, he would send out his picture and resume in response to advertisements. He was willing to try anything to achieve success, even going so far as to fabricate a story. He would call movie studios and claim to be an actor from Brussels with an investor from Hong Kong. He also instructed a friend to play along and act as if they wanted him to star in a movie and were willing to invest money, but required additional funding. Armed with this, he approached producers and suddenly found that all his phone calls were being answered. Of course, his intention was simply to meet the person and put his name out there, as opposed to securing illegitimate deals.

In the 1984 action film Missing in Action starring Norris, which was also released by Cannon Films, Van Damme is credited in the stunt team crew. That same year he also had a role in the comedy short film Monaco Forever.

Corey Yuen's martial arts film No Retreat, No Surrender, which premiered On 2 May 1986 in Los Angeles, was his first sizeable role when he was cast as the Russian villain. It starred Kurt McKinney, and was released through New World Pictures. McKinney stars as Jason Stillwell, a U.S. teenager who learns karate and defends his martial arts dojo against a Soviet martial artist played by Van Damme. Both Van Damme and McKinney were set to also star in No Retreat, No Surrender 2, but backed out.

He worked for director John McTiernan for the film Predator (1987) as an early (eventually abandoned) version of the titular alien, before being removed and replaced by Kevin Peter Hall. As the first choice to play the titular Predator character, with the intent that he would use his martial arts skills to make the alien an agile, ninja-like hunter, but after few days shot, he left the film. It was reported that he constantly complained about the monster suit being too hot and causing him to pass out; he allegedly also voiced reservations about only appearing on camera in the suit. Additionally, it became apparent that a more physically imposing actor was needed to make the creature appear threatening against the team of soldiers. The role eventually went to Kevin Peter Hall. After Predator was a success, Van Damme said that he appreciated the movie and that he had no regrets about missing that role.

Van Damme's breakout film was Bloodsport, which opened on 26 February 1988, based on the alleged true story of Frank Dux. It was shot on a $1.5-million budget for Cannon. The film is about U.S. Army Captain Frank Dux (played by Van Damme), trained from his youth in the ways of ninjutsu by Senzo Tanaka, who takes the place of Tanaka's deceased son Shingo in the illegal martial-arts tournament Kumite in Hong Kong. It became a U.S. box-office hit in the spring of 1988. Producer Mark Di Salle said he was looking for "a new martial arts star who was a ladies' man, [but Van Damme] appeals to both men and women. He's an American hero who fights for justice the American way and kicks the stuffing out of the bad guys." In reality, Van Damme had begged for a starring role; at the point of casting, he was homeless, sleeping in cars and garages, and sometimes had to resort to stealing food to survive. Also in 1988, he played another Russian villain in Black Eagle, opposite Sho Kosugi.

=== 1989–1999: International stardom ===
After the success of Bloodsport, Cannon Films offered him the lead in Delta Force 2, American Ninja 3 or Cyborg, a cyberpunk martial arts film directed by Albert Pyun. He chose Cyborg, which premiered in 1989. The film was a low budget box office success and led to two sequels, neither of which Van Damme appeared in.

Cannon used Van Damme again in Kickboxer released that same year. It was highly successful, returning over $50 million on a $3-million budget. The film started the Kickboxer franchise. He did not appear in any of the film's four sequels, though he did return as a different character in the reboot series.

In 1990, he starred in Death Warrant, the first script credit for David S. Goyer. Also that year he starred in Lionheart. Lionheart was directed by Sheldon Lettich who had co-written Bloodsport, and said the film was "the first movie to demonstrate that Van Damme was more than just a flash-in-the-pan "Karate Guy" who would never rise above simplistic low-budget karate movies." It also featured rear nudity from Van Damme, which Lettich says "became a very memorable moment for the ladies in the audience, and for the gay guys as well. Showing off his butt (clothed or unclothed) almost became a signature trademark of his after that."

In 1991, Double Impact was released. Directed by Lettich, it features Van Damme in the dual role of Alex and Chad Wagner, estranged twin brothers fighting to avenge the deaths of their parents. Upon its opening it received mixed reviews. The Los Angeles Times said the film "delivers the goods", while Variety didn't like the plotline and predicted a flop. The film grossed $23,683,813 in its first 28 days. It made a total of $30,102,717 in the US. Retrospective critics perceive it to be a fun action film, with good comical moments, and a good performance by Van Damme who plays two distinct characters.

In 1992, he starred in one of the biggest blockbusters of the year in the sci-fi action picture, Universal Soldier, directed by Roland Emmerich for Carolco. Van Damme (as Luc Deveraux) and Dolph Lundgren (as Sergeant Andrew Scott) play U.S. soldiers during the Vietnam War who end up shooting each other dead after Devereaux discovers that Scott has gone insane and resorted to mutilating civilians. They are later reanimated in a secret Army project along with a large group of other previously dead soldiers and sent on a mission. At the 1992 Cannes Film Festival, Van Damme and Lundgren were involved in a verbal altercation that almost turned physical when both men pushed each other only to be separated, but it was believed to have only been a publicity stunt. Universal Soldier opened in theatres on 10 July 1992, a moderate success domestically with $36,299,898 in US ticket sales, but a major blockbuster worldwide, making over $65 million overseas, which earned the film a total of $102 million worldwide, on a $23 million budget.

He was considered to play Simon Phoenix in Demolition Man and was briefly considered for the role of Michael Cheritto in Heat.

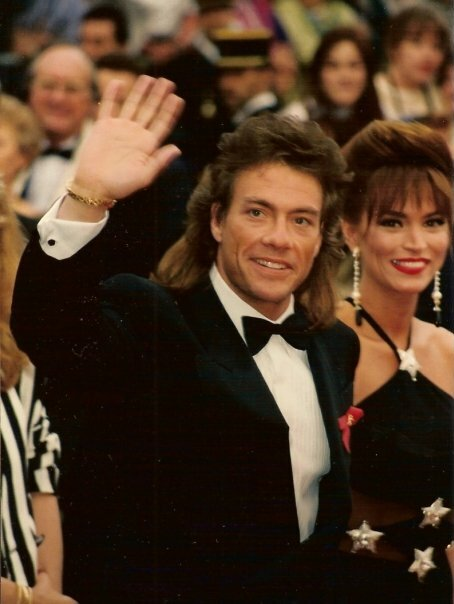
Van Damme at the Cannes Film Festival in 1993

In 1993, he made a cameo in Last Action Hero, and starred in Nowhere To Run. The film was the first in a three-picture deal between Van Damme and Columbia Pictures and his fee was $3.5 million. Columbia said the film is "true to his audience and goes beyond his audience." He also made the 1993 cover of Karaté Bushido, the oldest magazine dedicated to martial arts in Europe, joining martial artists such as Bruce Lee (1974), Bas Rutten (1997), Rickson Gracie (1998), Jackie Chan (2000), Fedor Emelianenko (2007), Georges St-Pierre (2008), Jérôme Le Banner (2012), Francis Ngannou (2019), and Dave Leduc (2020).

In 1994, he starred in Hard Target for Universal Pictures, the first American film from director John Woo. Also released that year, he starred in Timecop, playing a time-traveling cop. Directed by Peter Hyams, the film was a huge success, grossing over $100 million worldwide, and remains his highest-grossing film in a lead role to date. Also that year, he starred in Street Fighter, written and directed by Steven E. de Souza for Universal and based on the video game. It was poorly received critically. Though a commercial success, making approximately three times its production cost.

Van Damme and Hyams re-teamed for Universal's Sudden Death, released in 1995. Van Damme portrays a French Canadian-born firefighter with the Pittsburgh Fire Bureau who suffered a personal crisis after he was unable to save a young girl from a house fire. Now removed from active duty, he has become demoted to being fire marshal for the Pittsburgh Civic Arena, where a gang of terrorists are holding U.S. Vice President and several other VIPs hostage in a luxury suite during a game. The movie was a modest success.

In 1996, he starred and directed The Quest. The film, though it under-performed domestically, did better internationally at the box-office and was a commercial success. That year, he appeared in the TV show Friends in the two-part episode "The One After the Superbowl". He also starred in Maximum Risk, the first American film directed by Ringo Lam, and their first collaboration. The film was mildly successful at the box office.

He followed up with Double Team (1997), a sci fi action film with basketball superstar Dennis Rodman. It was Hong Kong director Tsui Hark's American debut.

In 1998, he and Hark reunited on Knock Off, a box-office flop. Also that year, Van Damme acted in the war film Legionnaire. Despite a $35 million budget, it was not released theatrically in the US, only overseas.

In 1999, he starred in Universal Soldier: The Return, (1999), where he returns as Luc Deveraux. The movie did poorly at the box office debuting at #4, which proved to be his last theatrical release until JCVD in 2008. That year he also starred in Inferno (1999).

=== 2000–2007: Switch to direct-to-video ===
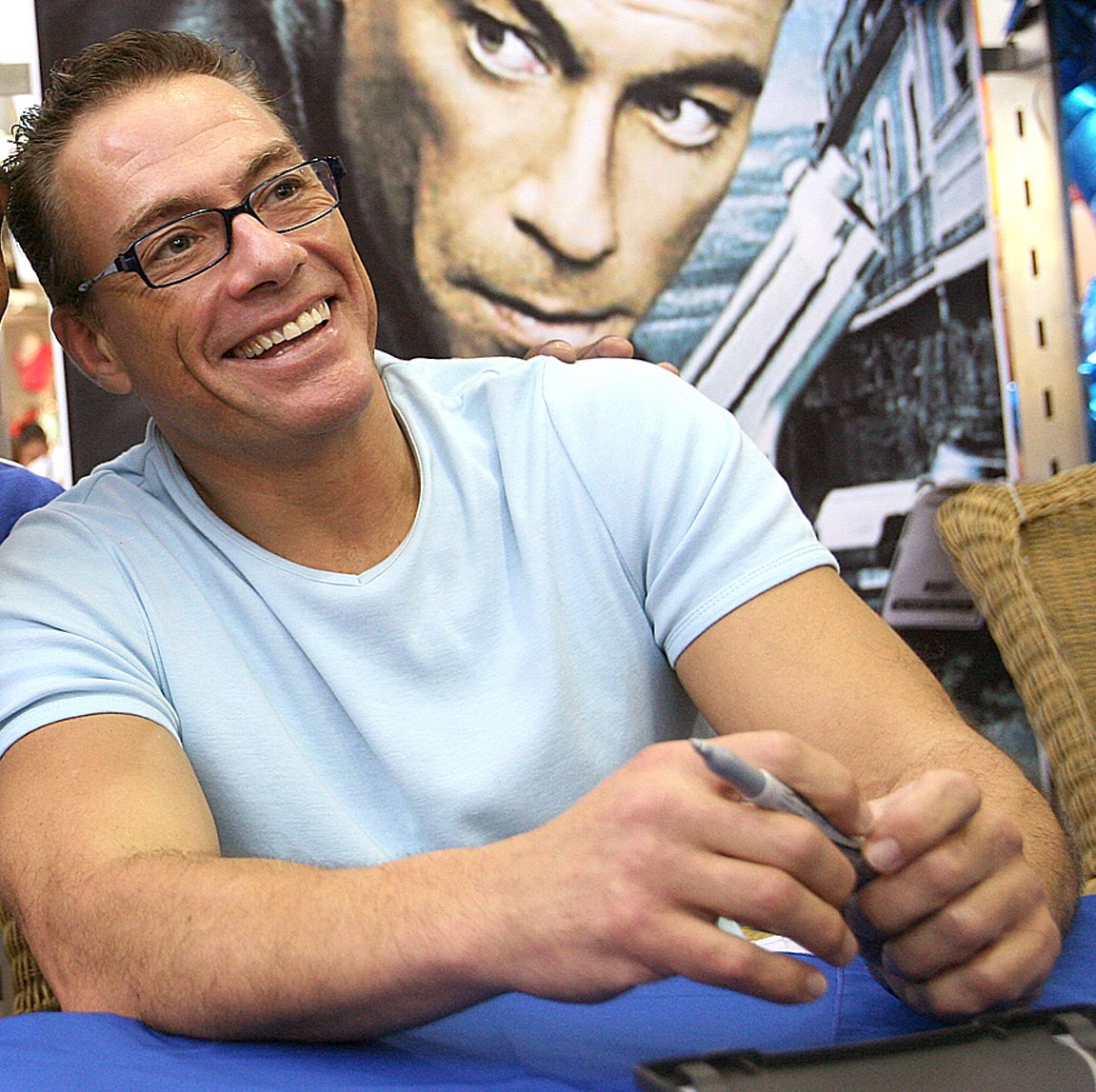
Van Damme in 2007

Released in 2001, Replicant is the second collaboration between Van Damme and director Ringo Lam, and the fifth time that Van Damme has starred in a dual role. It co-stars Michael Rooker. Also that year he starred in The Order, directed by Sheldon Lettich, and written by Van Damme.

In 2002, he starred in Derailed. In Hell is a 2003 American prison action film directed by Ringo Lam. It is the third collaboration between Van Damme and Lam. Van Damme plays an American working overseas in Magnitogorsk, Russia. That same year, he employed his dancing training in the music video for Bob Sinclar's "Kiss My Eyes".

His 2004 film was Wake of Death, an action film directed by Philippe Martinez. Ringo Lam was the original director, but he left the project after a few weeks of filming in Canada. It co-stars Simon Yam, Valerie Tian, Tony Schiena, etc.

In 2005, he played himself in the French film Narco. In 2006, he starred in Second in Command directed by Simon Fellows, and The Hard Corps directed by Sheldon Lettich.

In 2007, he played a small role in The Exam, a Turkish comedy-drama film directed by Ömer Faruk Sorak. Also that year he starred in Until Death.

=== 2008–2013: Return to mainstream ===
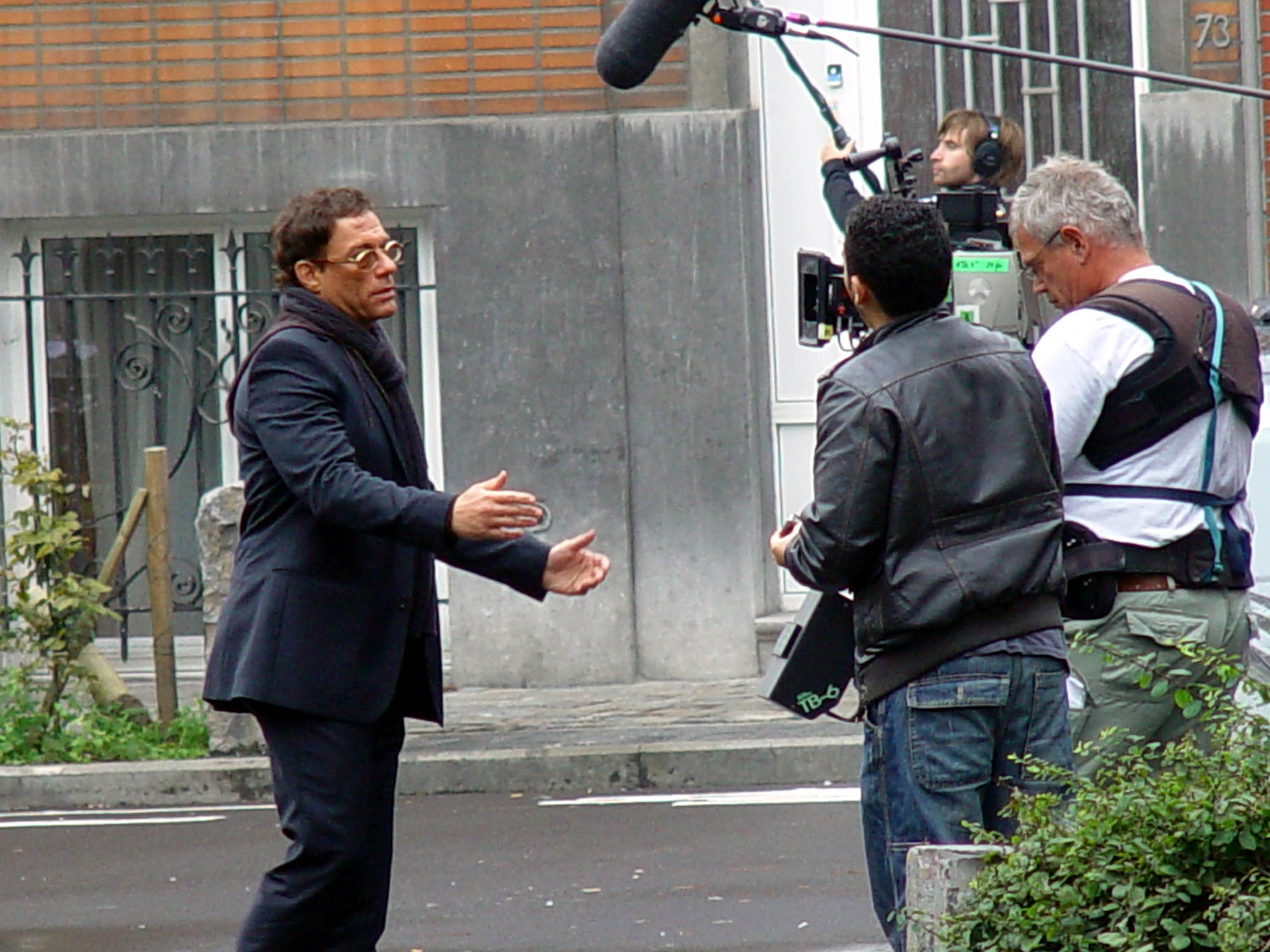
Van Damme on the set of JCVD in October 2007

Van Damme returned to the mainstream with the limited theatrical release of the 2008 film JCVD, which received positive reviews. Time Magazine named his performance in the film the second best of the year (after Heath Ledger's The Joker in The Dark Knight), having previously stated that Van Damme "deserves not a black belt, but an Oscar." Also in 2008, he starred in Isaac Florentine's The Shepherd: Border Patrol.

He then reprised his role as Luc Deveraux alongside Dolph Lundgren in the 2009 film Universal Soldier: Regeneration, directed by John Hyams. The film was released theatrically in the Middle East and Southeast Asia and directly to video in the United States and other parts of the world. Since its release, the film has received mostly positive reviews, with praise towards the performances and surprisingly high production values.

In 2010, he directed himself in the barely released Full Love. That same year, he turned down the role of Gunner Jensen in the first instalment of The Expendables and the role went to Dolph Lundgren.

In 2011, he voiced Master Croc in the computer animation film Kung Fu Panda 2. In the film, he voices a character who helps the heroes of the previous film. That same year, he co-starred with Scott Adkins in Assassination Games. Also in 2011, he played a role in the French comedy Beur sur la ville. Also that year, he starred in his own reality TV show Behind Closed Doors. The show showcases his family life, his personal troubles, and an upcoming fight. Since 2009, he has been planning to make a comeback to fight former boxing Olympic gold-medalist Somluck Kamsing. The fight was a focal point in his ITV reality show Behind Closed Doors. The fight has been repeatedly postponed, with many critics doubting it will occur, especially due to the difficulty of booking the venue.

In 2012, he acted in the Russian comedy film named Rzhevsky Versus Napoleon, and U.F.O. He starred in Dragon Eyes, Universal Soldier: Day of Reckoning, and Six Bullets.

Also that year, he starred as the main villain in The Expendables 2. The film series follows a mercenary group as they undertake a mission which evolves into a quest for revenge against a rival mercenary (Van Damme). The film was a success, grossing over $310 million worldwide, and was his big return to the action genre. Empire's Nick de Semlyen praised Van Damme's "grandstanding, plutonium-crazed baddie" and Lundgren's "action-troll" as high points in the film. Also that year, he was seen as part of Kam Sing's ring crew when Kam Sing fought against Jomhod Kiatadisak. He also appeared in commercials for Coors Light beer, showing him on a snow-covered mountain wearing a sleeveless denim jacket, and for the washing powder Dash. On 21 October 2012, he was honored with a life-size statue of himself in his hometown of Brussels. He told reporters during the unveiling, "Belgium is paying me back something, but really it's to pay back to the dream. So when people come by here, it is not Jean-Claude van Damme but it's a guy from the street who believed in something. I want the statue to represent that".

In 2013, he acted in the comedy Welcome to the Jungle. Also that year, he played the main villain in Enemies Closer, an American action thriller film directed by Peter Hyams. On 13 November 2013, Volvo Trucks released an advertisement on YouTube that shows Van Damme doing the splits while perched with each of his feet on the outer rearview mirrors of one semi-trailer truck and one box truck moving backwards, which he describes in the commercial as "the most epic of splits". The video quickly went viral around the web, receiving more than 11 million views in three days, 35 million in the first week. It was dubbed as The Epic Split.

=== 2014–present: Subsequent films ===
Swelter is a 2014 American action film in which he plays one of the leads. It stars Lennie James, and co-stars Grant Bowler, Josh Henderson, and Alfred Molina. James plays a sheriff in a small town who has a dark past that he can not remember, only to have to confront it when his ex-partners show up looking for stolen money they believe he has.

In 2015, he starred in the action thriller film Pound of Flesh, directed by Ernie Barbarash. Also that year, he had a supporting role in a Chinese superhero parody film.

In 2016, he returned to his voice role of Master Croc in the Kung Fu Panda franchise for the third installment. Also that year, he acted in Kickboxer: Vengeance directed by John Stockwell. It is a reboot of the original where he was the lead. That year he also played the lead in the TV series Jean-Claude Van Johnson.

In 2017, he starred in Kill 'Em All, an action film directed by Peter Malota.

In 2018, he returned to his role in Kickboxer: Retaliation, a sequel to the reboot. That same year, he acted in Black Water. It co-stars Dolph Lundgren in the fifth collaboration between both actors as well as the first time they appear together as on-screen allies. In 22 August of that same year, he starred in Julien Leclercq's The Bouncer.

In 2019, he starred in We Die Young. In 2021, he starred in The Last Mercenary. In 2022, he voiced the character Jean-Clawed in the computer animation film Minions: The Rise of Gru.

In 2023, he featured his likeness and voice as Johnny Cage in the fighting game Mortal Kombat 1 (2023). In 2024, he debuted in Hitman: World of Assassination as the game's latest "elusive target". The game features Van Damme in the role of Max Valliant, a former ICA agent who avoided a previous assassination attempt several years prior.

== Monuments ==
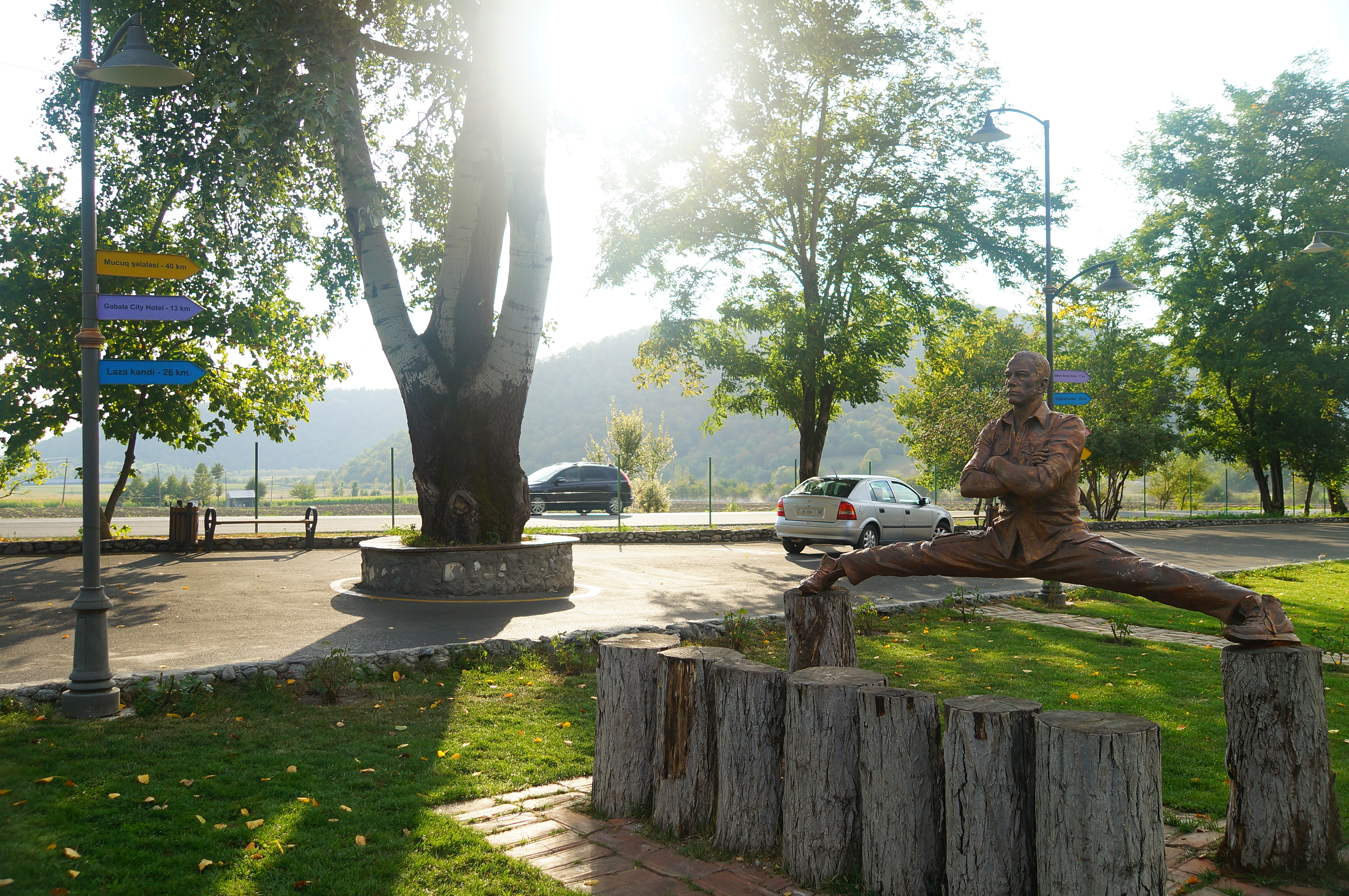
Van Damme Monument in Qabala, Azerbaijan

In 2012, a statue of Van Damme was unveiled in Anderlecht, Belgium. The artwork, which depicts a younger incarnation of the Muscles from Brussels in one of his fighting poses from the movie Kickboxer, was commissioned to commemorate the 40th anniversary of the Westland Shopping complex. The unveiling took place on Boulevard Sylvain Dupuis and was attended by Van Damme, his parents, Wallonia-Brussels culture minister Fadila Laanan and nearly 2,000 fans. Van Damme said the statue "represented the dream of a Brussels kid" and was "for all the children who want something bad", adding that "if you believe in something strongly enough, it can come true".

In 2019, a Van Damme monument was mounted in the Vandam village of Qabala, Azerbaijan, due to the similarity of the village name and Van Damme's name. The actor subsequently published a post on his Facebook account, thanking those responsible.

== Controversies ==
=== Lawsuit and fight record controversy ===
In 1997, Frank Dux, the martial artist whom Van Damme portrayed in Bloodsport, filed a lawsuit against him for $50,000 for co-writing and consultation work Dux did on the 1996 film The Quest. According to the lawsuit, Dux also accused him of lying to the public about his martial arts fight record, stating that when Dux tutored Van Damme while the latter was laying carpet for a living, Van Damme exhibited a lack of martial arts skills. Van Damme's lawyer, Martin Singer, responded, "There are records to document his martial arts acclaim. Why, just look at his movies; he didn't get those roles on his acting ability! He's the one who does those splits on chairs. He doesn't have a stuntman to do that."

=== Chuck Zito incident ===
Tensions arose between Van Damme and bodyguard/stuntman Chuck Zito when Zito began dating Van Damme's estranged wife Darcy LaPier. Zito was reportedly unhappy about LaPier's claim in a divorce action that Van Damme had abused her. On 6 February 1998, the New York Daily News reported that Van Damme had been punched by Zito the previous night at the Scores strip club in Manhattan, New York. Zito, who had previously bodyguarded Van Damme and did stunts on the film Nowhere to Run, recalled the incident in his 2002 autobiography Street Justice, claiming that he suffered a broken hand as a result of striking Van Damme several times after Van Damme made disparaging remarks about him to a club bouncer, who then relayed the comments to Zito. Van Damme denied in an appearance on Inside Edition days after the incident that he had been struck by Zito and challenged Zito to a fight.

=== Kadyrov event ===
In October 2011, Van Damme, along with other celebrities including Hilary Swank, Vanessa-Mae and Seal attracted criticism from human rights groups for attending an event in Russian federal subject Chechnya's capital Grozny on the 35th birthday of Chechen president Ramzan Kadyrov on 5 October. Human rights groups, who had urged the celebrities to cancel their appearances because of abuses carried out under Kadyrov, criticised the celebrities for attending the event. Human Rights Watch released a statement which read, "Ramzan Kadyrov is linked to a litany of horrific human rights abuses. It's inappropriate for stars to get paid to party with him [...] And getting paid to be part of such a lavish show in Chechnya trivializes the suffering of countless victims of human rights abuses there."

=== Human trafficking allegations ===
In April 2025, Van Damme was accused by the Romanian Directorate for Investigating Organized Crime and Terrorism of participating in the human trafficking of five Romanian women which allegedly took place in Cannes.

== Public image and influence ==
Van Damme is widely regarded as an icon of action and martial arts cinema. At the height of his career, he was one of the biggest action movie stars in the world, and one of the most successful martial arts actors of the 1980s and 1990s, alongside Steven Seagal. His popularity is credited with opening the Hollywood doors to names like Don Wilson, Olivier Gruner, Dale Cook and Loren Avedon. Described as the most 'remade' action star, his films have spawned endless sequels, such as Bloodsport II: The Next Kumite (1996), Bloodsport III (1997), Bloodsport 4: The Dark Kumite (1999), Cyborg 2 (1993), Cyborg 3: The Recycler (1994), Kickboxer 2–6, Universal Soldier II: Brothers in Arms (1998), Universal Soldier III: Unfinished Business (1998), Hard Target 2 (2016), Street Fighter: The Legend of Chun-Li (2009), Street Fighter: Assassin's Fist (2014), Timecop 2: The Berlin Decision (2003), the Timecop (1997), and Welcome to Sudden Death (2020). Van Damme's influence has been compared to the Bruceploitation explosion of the 1970s.

Van Damme achieved sex symbol status through publicity venues in the late 1980s and early 1990s. Unlike his major rivals in action film, such as Arnold Schwarzenegger, Sylvester Stallone, Steven Seagal, and Bruce Willis, Van Damme was nominated by the National Enquirer as number one on their "Top Ten Sexiest Men in the World" list, being the only action film star listed.

Many martial artists, athletes, and filmmakers have cited Van Damme as an influence, such as Alain Moussi, Scott Adkins, Ron Smoorenburg, Will Smith, Dave Callaham, Adam Brody, Jay Cutler, Lyoto Machida, Michael Page, Anderson Silva, Georges St-Pierre, Cain Velasquez, Nick Diaz, Nate Diaz, Michael Bisping, Conor McGregor, Jiří Procházka, Mirko Cro Cop, Rico Verhoeven, Tom Duquesnoy, John Albert, Charles Rosa, Murad Ramazanov, Halil Amir, Andrei Stoica, Giorgio Petrosyan, Alfie Davis, Enkh-Orgil Baatarkhuu, and Angela Chang. In August 2016, Georges St-Pierre described fighting Van Damme in the film Kickboxer: Vengeance as "a dream come true".

American professional wrestler Robert Alexander Szatkowski was given his ring name "Rob Van Dam" in 1992 by Ron Slinker, a promoter in Florida, possibly because of his martial arts experience and his resemblance to Van Damme. Belgian professional wrestler Bernard Vandamme took his name from both the above.

The original video game Mortal Kombat (1992) was conceived as a fighting game based on Van Damme. Creators Ed Boon and John Tobias had originally wanted to star Van Damme himself in the game. That fell through as he had allegedly a prior deal for another game under the auspices of the Sega Genesis platform. Boon and Tobias eventually decided to create a character named Johnny Cage, who is modelled after Van Damme, primarily from Van Damme's appearance and outfit in the martial arts film Bloodsport. In the German version of the Donkey Kong 64 website, DK's greatest hero is Jean-Claude Van Kong.

In 2016, Van Damme was named as the "World Boxing Council Muay Thai Ambassador" by the WBC.

In 2020, Van Damme was inducted into the Martial Arts History Museum Hall of Fame.

== Personal life ==
From 1993 to 1996, the stress of the constant filming and promotion of his films, as Van Damme claims, led him to develop a cocaine habit, on which he spent up to $10,000 a week, and consuming up to 10 grams per day by 1996. He was arrested for driving under the influence in 1999. Attempts at drug rehabilitation were unsuccessful, and he resorted to resolve his addiction via quitting cold turkey and exercise. In 1998, he was diagnosed with bipolar disorder. In 2011, he discussed the condition on the British reality show Jean-Claude Van Damme: Behind Closed Doors, saying, "Sometimes you're gonna like me, and sometimes you're gonna hate me. But what can I do? I'm not perfect ... I'm an extreme bipolar, and I'm taking medication for this ... When I was young, I was suffering those swing moods. In the morning, the sky was blue [when I was] going to school, and to me, the sky was black. I was so sad."

He has been married five times to four different women. From 1989 until 1992 he was married to his third wife, bodybuilder Gladys Portugues, with whom he has two children, Kristopher (b. 1987) and Bianca Brigitte (b. 1990). He had begun an affair with actress Darcy LaPier, whom he married in February 1994. From this marriage, they have a son named Nicholas (b. 10 October 1995). That same year he had an affair with his Street Fighter co-star Kylie Minogue during filming in Thailand. LaPier, who was pregnant with their son at the time, did not become aware of the affair until Van Damme publicly admitted it in 2012. He remarried Portugues in 1999.

In October 2016, he expressed his support for presidential candidate Donald Trump during the 2016 election. Earlier that year in March, he mentioned that the Illuminati including the Rockefellers and Rothschilds might try to stop Trump from winning.

In December 2022, he visited a clinic in Uzhhorod, Ukraine, and took the opportunity to meet Ukrainian military personnel, declaring "Slava Ukraini" on a local television. In a video on Youtube, he justifies this as a message of peace. On 16 April 2025, JCVD posted a video on Diana Panchenko's Telegram channel in which he asked Putin to become an ambassador for peace based on love and sport, recalling their first meetings.

=== Conservationism ===
Outside acting, Van Damme has publicly supported various conservationist causes and animal rights organisations, appearing in a number of PSAs for Animals Australia, and working towards his goal of rallying celebrities and fellow actors in creating sanctuaries for endangered species. In 2022, he was appointed as Democratic Republic of the Congo Ambassador On Environment, with the role of enhancing the protection of forests as well as local fauna and flora.

== Filmography ==
=== Film ===
Year	Title	Role	Notes
1979	Woman Between Wolf and Dog	Moviegoer / Man in Garden	Uncredited extra
1984	Missing in Action	Soldier	Also credited for stunts
1984	Monaco Forever	Gay karate man	Short film
1984	Breakin'	Spectator in the first dance scene	Uncredited extra
1985	No Retreat, No Surrender	Ivan Kraschinsky	
1988	Bloodsport	Frank Dux	Also editor (uncredited)
1988	Black Eagle	Andrei	
1989	Cyborg	Gibson Rickenbacker	Also editor (uncredited)
1989	Kickboxer	Kurt Sloane	Also writer, fight director and choreographer
1990	Lionheart	Lyon Gaultier	Also writer and fight choreographer
1990	Death Warrant	Louis Burke	
1991	Double Impact	Alex Wagner / Chad Wagner	Dual role; also writer, producer and fight choreographer
1992	Universal Soldier	Luc Deveraux	
1993	Nowhere to Run	Sam Gillen	
1993	Last Action Hero	Himself	Cameo
1993	Hard Target	Chance Boudreaux	
1994	Timecop	Max Walker	
1994	Street Fighter	Colonel William F. Guile	
1995	Sudden Death	Darren McCord	
1996	The Quest	Christopher Dubois	Also director and writer
1996	Maximum Risk	Alain Moreau / Mikhail Suverov	Dual role
1997	Double Team	Jack Paul Quinn	
1998	Knock Off	Marcus Ray	
1998	Legionnaire	Alain Lefèvre	Also writer and producer
1999	Universal Soldier: The Return	Luc Deveraux	Also producer
1999	Inferno	Eddie Lomax	Limited release; also producer
2001	Replicant	Edward "The Torch" Garrotte (Luc Savard) / The Replicant	Dual role; direct-to-video
2001	The Order	Rudy Cafmeyer / Charles Le Vaillant	Dual role; also writer; direct-to-video
2002	Derailed	Jacques Kristoff	Direct-to-video
2003	In Hell	Kyle LeBlanc	Direct-to-video
2004	Narco	Jean's Ghost by Lenny	
2004	Wake of Death	Ben Archer	Direct-to-video
2006	Second in Command	Samuel Keenan	Direct-to-video
2006	The Hard Corps	Philippe Sauvage	Direct-to-video
2006	The Exam	Charles	
2007	Until Death	Anthony Stowe	Direct-to-video
2008	The Shepherd: Border Patrol	Jack Robideaux	Direct-to-video
2008	JCVD	Himself	Limited release; also executive producer
2009	Universal Soldier: Regeneration	Luc Deveraux	Direct-to-video
2011	Kung Fu Panda 2	Master Croc	Voice role
2011	Assassination Games	Vincent Brazil	Limited release; also executive producer
2011	Beur sur la ville	Colonel Merot	Cameo
2011	Rzhevsky versus Napoleon	Himself	Cameo
2011	Dragon Eyes	Jean-Louis Tiano	Limited release
2012	The Expendables 2	Jean Vilain	Van Damme's first widely released film since 1999
2012	Universal Soldier: Day of Reckoning	Luc Deveraux	Limited release
2012	Six Bullets	Samson Gaul	Direct-to-video; also executive producer
2012	U.F.O.	George	Limited release
2013	Welcome to the Jungle	Storm Rothschild	Limited release
2013	Enemies Closer	Xander	Limited release
2013	Swelter	Stillman	Direct-to-video
2015	Pound of Flesh	Deacon Lyle	Limited release; also executive producer
2015	Jian Bing Man	Himself	Cameo
2016	Kung Fu Panda 3	Master Croc	Voice role
2016	Kickboxer: Vengeance	Master Durand	Limited release
2017	Kill 'Em All	Philip	Direct-to-video
2018	Kickboxer: Retaliation	Master Durand	Limited release
2018	Black Water	Wheeler	Limited release; also executive producer
2018	The Bouncer	Lukas	Limited release
2019	We Die Young	Daniel	Limited release
2021	The Last Mercenary	Richard Brumère / The Mist	
2021	Haters	Le fan de Thomas	
2022	Minions: The Rise of Gru	Jean Clawed	Voice role
2024	Darkness of Man	Russell Hatch	Also story
2024	Kill 'Em All 2	Philip	Direct-to-video
2025	The Gardener	Leo	French movie
TBA	Frenchy	Frenchy	Also writer, director, producer and editor; complete

=== Television ===
Year	Title	Role	Notes
1996	Friends	Himself	Episode: "The One After the Superbowl"
2004	Las Vegas	Himself	Episode: "Die Fast, Die Furious"
2009	Robot Chicken	Himself / Count Dracula / Rhett Butler (voices)	Episode: "Maurice Was Caught"
2011	Jean-Claude Van Damme: Behind Closed Doors	Himself	8 episodes; also producer
2011	Les Anges Gardiens	Himself	20 episodes
2016	Sense8	Himself	Episode: "Happy F*cking New Year"
2016–2017	Jean-Claude Van Johnson	Johnson / Filip	6 episodes; also executive producer for "Pilot"
2020	Les Anges Asian Dream	Himself	
2022	Ramez Movie Star	Himself	Arabian pranks show, represented by him and Ramez Galal
2023	Jean-Claude Van Damme, Coup sur coup	Himself	TV special

=== Music videos ===
Year	Song title	Artist(s)
1992	"Body Count's in the House"	Body Count
1994	"Time Won't Let Me"	The Smithereens
1994	"Straight to My Feet"	MC Hammer featuring Deion Sanders
1995	"Something There"	Chage and Aska
1999	"Crush 'Em"	Megadeth
2003	"Kiss My Eyes"	Bob Sinclar
2008	"Ya Lyublyu Ego"	Iryna Bilyk and Olga Gorbacheva
2015	"The Hum"	Dimitri Vegas & Like Mike vs. Ummet Ozcan
2020	"Ultrarêve"	AaRON

=== Video games ===
Year	Title	Role	Note
1995	Street Fighter: The Movie	Colonel Guile	
2021	Warpath	Himself	As fictional general
2023	Mortal Kombat 1	Johnny Cage	Voice and likeness; JCVD DLC skin
2024	Hitman: World of Assassination	Max Valliant	As an elusive target

== Awards and nominations ==
Year	Award	Category	Work	Result
1988	Golden Raspberry Award	Worst New Star	Bloodsport	Nominated
1992	MTV Movie Award	Most Desirable Male	Double Impact	Nominated
1993	MTV Movie Award	Most Desirable Male	Nowhere to Run	Nominated
1994	MTV Movie Award	Most Desirable Male	Hard Target	Nominated
1998	Golden Raspberry Award	Worst Screen Couple (with Dennis Rodman)	Double Team	Won
2001	Video Premiere Award	Best Actor	Replicant	Nominated
2004	Bollywood Movie Award	International Action Super Star	Himself	Won
2008	Silver Leopard	Best Actor	JCVD	Nominated
2009	TFCA Award	Best Performance, Male	JCVD	Nominated
2014	Golden Lotus Award	Outstanding Achievement of Action Movies Show	Himself	Won

== Championships and accomplishments ==
Belgium Karate Lightweight Championships (1977 Gold)

Mr. Belgium bodybuilding Championships (1978 Gold)

Belgium Karate team European Championships (1979 Gold)

Belgium Coupe des Espoirs Karate Tournament Championships (1980 Silver)

Martial Arts History Museum Hall of Fame – Class of 2020

== Fight record ==
=== Semi-contact/light-contact record ===
Result	Record	Opponent	Method	Date	Round	Event	Location	Notes
Win	44–4–0	(Belgium) Jonny Wellum	Decision	7 May 1980	3	WAKO	Brussels, Belgium	Light-Contact (Van Damme avenges early career defeat)
Win	43–4–0	(Belgium) Jordy Claes	Decision	1980	3	Gala International WAKO	Brussels, Belgium	Light-Contact
Win	42–4–0	(Belgium) Patrick Teugels	l'abandon (TKO)	8 March 1980	1	Forest Nationals	Brussels, Belgium	Light-Contact (Teugels suffers a broken nose and is unable to continue)
Win	41–4–0	(Hungary) Andras Kovacs	Decision	1980	3	WAKO	Brussels, Belgium	Semi-Contact
Win	40–4–0	(Algeria) Bekim-Moussa Muhammad	Decision	1980	3	WAKO	Brussels, Belgium	Semi-Contact
Win	39–4–0	(Algeria) Mustapha-Ahmad Benamou	Decision	1980	3	WAKO	Brussels, Belgium	Semi-Contact
Win	38–4–0	(Germany) Reinhard Krass	Disq.	26 December 1979	2	Karate Tournament: Belgium Team vs. German Team	Woluwe, Brussels, Belgium	Light-Contact
Win	37–4–0	(Portugal) Gilberto Dias	l'abandon	November 1979	1	World All-styles Karate Organization	Brussels, Belgium	Light-Contact (Dias suffers ankle injury and is unable to continue)
Win	36–4–0	(Germany) Hans Kohler	Decision	1979	3	World All-styles Karate Organization	Ingelmunster, Belgium	Semi-Contact
Loss	35–4–0	(Belgium) Patrick Teugels	Decision	1979	3	WAKO	Tampa, Florida, USA	Light-Contact (Both men fight in karate-gi uniforms, no pads or gloves)
Win	35–3–0	(Belgium) Matthias Evrard	Decision	1979	3	Cup of Antwerp World All-styles Karate Organization	Antwerp, Belgium	Semi-Contact
Win	34–3–0	(Belgium) Paul Sperati	Decision	1979	3	World All-styles Karate Organization	Opprebais, Belgium	Semi-Contact
Win	33–3–0	(Belgium) Lucus Reinfeld	Decision	1979	3	World All-styles Karate Organization, Europe Interland Cup	Mulhouse, Belgium	Semi-Contact
Win	32–3–0	(Belgium) Robbe Bogaerts	Decision	1978	3	Hope Cup World All-styles Karate Organization	Brussels, Belgium	Semi-Contact
Win	31–3–0	(Belgium) Leonard Baptiste	Decision	1978	3	World All-styles Karate Organization	Izegem, Belgium	Semi-Contact
Win	30–3–0	(Portugal) Fernando Cabanela	Decision	1978	3	World All-styles Karate Organization	Izegem, Belgium	Semi-Contact
Loss	29–3–0	(Belgium) Angelo Spataro	Decision	1978	3	Challenge Coupe des Espoirs Karate Tournament (1st Trials)	Antwerp, Belgium	Light-Contact
Win	29–2–0	(Belgium) Gabriel van der Driessche	Decision	1978	3	Challenge Coupe des Espoirs Karate Tournament (1st Trials)	Antwerp, Belgium	Light-Contact
Win	28–2–0	(Belgium) Farid Muhammad Mousseau	Decision	1978	3	Challenge Coupe des Espoirs Karate Tournament (1st Trials)	Antwerp, Belgium	Light-Contact
Win	27–2–0	(Belgium) Jacques van Laere	Decision	1978	3	Challenge Coupe des Espoirs Karate Tournament (1st Trials)	Antwerp, Belgium	Light-Contact
Win	26–2–0	(Belgium) Christian Hedin	Decision	1978	3	Challenge Coupe des Espoirs Karate Tournament (1st Trials)	Antwerp, Belgium	Light-Contact
Win	25–2–0	(Belgium) Gerard Charon	Decision	1978	3	Challenge Coupe des Espoirs Karate Tournament (1st Trials)	Antwerp, Belgium	Light-Contact
Win	24–2–0	(Portugal) David Arranz	Decision	1978	3	Challenge Coupe des Espoirs Karate Tournament (1st Trials)	Antwerp, Belgium	Light-Contact
Win	23–2–0	(Belgium) Bernard Redden	Decision	1978	3	Challenge Coupe des Espoirs Karate Tournament (1st Trials)	Antwerp, Belgium	Light-Contact
Win	22–2–0	(Belgium) Antoine Redi	Decision	1978	3	Challenge Coupe des Espoirs Karate Tournament (1st Trials)	Antwerp, Belgium	Light-Contact
Win	21–2–0	(Belgium) Ben Salah Ellah	Decision	1978	3	Challenge Coupe des Espoirs Karate Tournament (1st Trials)	Antwerp, Belgium	Light-Contact
Win	20–2–0	(Belgium) Gaston Airey	Foul	1978	1	Challenge Coupe des Espoirs Karate Tournament (1st Trials)	Antwerp, Belgium	Light-Contact
Win	19–2–0	(Belgium) Abdembi Hassan Ali	Decision	1978	3	Challenge Coupe des Espoirs Karate Tournament (1st Trials)	Antwerp, Belgium	Light-Contact
Win	18–2–0	(Portugal) Jonas "Marcel" Cohen	Decision	1978	3	Challenge Coupe des Espoirs Karate Tournament (1st Trials)	Antwerp, Belgium	Light-Contact
Win	17–2–0	(Belgium) Christian van Tieghem	Decision	1978	3	Challenge Coupe des Espoirs Karate Tournament (1st Trials)	Antwerp, Belgium	Light-Contact
Win	16–2–0	(Belgium) Max Roelandt	Decision	1978	3	Challenge Coupe des Espoirs Karate Tournament (1st Trials)	Antwerp, Belgium	Light-Contact
Win	15–2–0	(Belgium) Andre Verbon	Decision	1978	3	Challenge Coupe des Espoirs Karate Tournament (1st Trials)	Antwerp, Belgium	Light-Contact
Win	14–2–0	(Belgium) Michel Juvillier	Decision	1978	3	Challenge Coupe des Espoirs Karate Tournament (1st Trials)	Antwerp, Belgium	Light-Contact
Win	13–2–0	(Belgium) Joel Maoreau	Decision	1978	3	Challenge Coupe des Espoirs Karate Tournament (1st Trials)	Antwerp, Belgium	Light-Contact
Win	12–2–0	(Belgium) Ronald Duivenbode	Decision	1978	3	Challenge Coupe des Espoirs Karate Tournament (1st Trials)	Antwerp, Belgium	Semi-Contact
Loss	11–2–0	(Belgium) Patrick Teugels	Decision	1978	3	Belgium Lightweight Championship	Antwerp, Belgium	Light-Contact
Win	11–1–0	(Belgium) Gris Lubbers	Decision	1976	3	European Karate Union	Ingelmunster, Belgium	Semi-Contact
Win	10–1–0	(Belgium) Andre Lemaire	Decision	1977	3	World Association of Kickboxing Organizations Open International	Izegem, Belgium	Semi-Contact
Win	9–1–0	(Belgium) Patrick Teugels	Decision	1977	3	Antwerp Open International Competition WAKO	Antwerp, Belgium	Light-Contact
Win	8–1–0	(Belgium) Maurice Devos	Decision	1977	3	World Allstyles Kickboxing Organization	Antwerp, Belgium	Semi-Contact
Win	7–1–0	(France) Jacques Berri	Decision	1976	3	Antwerp Open WAKO	Antwerp, Belgium	Semi-Contact
Win	6–1–0	(Belgium) Johannes Binding	Decision	1976	3	Antwerp Open WAKO	Antwerp, Belgium	Semi-Contact
Win	5–1–0	(France) Jean-Morin Devigne	Decision	1976	3	Antwerp Open WAKO	Antwerp, Belgium	Semi-Contact
Win	4–1–0	(Belgium) Roland Vedani	Decision	1976	3	European Karate Union	Ingelmunster, Belgium	Semi-Contact
Win	3–1–0	(Belgium) Jean-Paul Gaston	Decision	1976	3	European Karate Union	Brussels, Belgium	Semi-Contact
Loss	2–1–0	(Belgium) Jonny Wellum	Decision	22 January 1976	3	La Federation Europeene de Karate (European Karate Federation)	Brussels, Belgium	Semi-Contact (J. Vandenberg credit with defaite)
Win	2–0–0	(Belgium) Bernard Briers	Decision	22 January 1976	3	La Federation Europeene de Karate (European Karate Federation)	Brussels, Belgium	Semi-Contact (J. Vandenberg credit with victoire)
Win	1–0–0	(Belgium) Robin Lomard	Decision	22 January 1976	3	La Federation Europeene de Karate (European Karate Federation)	Brussels, Belgium	Semi-Contact (J. Vandenberg credit with victoire - Karate magazine Boxe francaise)

=== Kickboxing record ===
Result	Record	Opponent	Method	Date	Round	Time	Event	Location	Notes
Win	18–1–0	(India) Nedjad Gharbi	KKO	1982	1			Brussels, Belgium	Kickboxing
Win	17–1–0	(Belgium) Daniel Le Jaouen	KKO	1982	1	1:05		Brussels, Belgium	Kickboxing
Win	16–1–0	(Belgium) Lenny Leikman	KKO	1982	3		1st Journée des Arts Martiaux	Brussels, Belgium	Kickboxing
Win	15–1–0	(Turkey) Ajom Mahmud Uddin	KO	1981	1	0:19		Brussels, Belgium	Kickboxing
Win	14–1–0	(Algeria) Mustapha-Ahmad Benamou	KKO	1981	1			Brussels, Belgium	Kickboxing
Win	13–1–0	(Netherlands) Henk Besselman	KO	1981	1			Brussels, Belgium	Kickboxing
Win	12–1–0	(United Kingdom) Michael J. Heming	KKO	1980	1	0:46	European Karate Federation Middleweight Championship	Brussels, Belgium	Kickboxing
Win	11–1–0	(France) Georges Verlugels	KO	1980	2		PKA Middleweight Championship	Brussels, Belgium	Kickboxing
Win	10–1–0	(United States) Sherman Bergman	KKO	1979 Nov 4	1	0:56		Tampa, Florida, USA	Full-Contact
Win	9–1–0	(Germany) Rolf Risberg	KKO	1979	1			Ingelmunster, Belgium	Kickboxing
Win	8–1–0	(Belgium) Emile Leibman	KKO	1979	1			Izegem, Belgium	Kickboxing
Win	7–1–0	(Belgium) Cyrille Nollet	KKO	1978	1			Izegem, Belgium	Kickboxing
Win	6–1–0	(Belgium) Orlando Lang	KO	1978	1	0:26		Antwerp, Belgium	Kickboxing
Win	5–1–0	(Belgium) Jacques Piniarski	KKO	1978	1			Belgium	Kickboxing
Win	4–1–0	(Germany) Eric "Basel" Strauss	KKO	1978	1	0:18		Antwerp, Belgium	Kickboxing
Win	3–1–0	(Belgium) Andre "Robar" Robaeys	KKO	1978	1			Mulhouse, France	Kickboxing
Win	2–1–0	(Belgium) Michel Juvillier	KO	1978	1	0:39		Antwerp, Belgium	Full-Contact
Loss	1–1–0	(France) Etienne "Tuf" Aubry	DQ	7 March 1977	1	1:02		Marseille, France	Full-Contact (Karate magazine Boxe francaise)
Win	1–0–0	(Belgium) Toon van Oostrum	KKO	1977	1	0:46		Brussels, Belgium	Full-Contact

== Books cited ==
- Corcoran, John; Farkas, Emil (1988). Martial Arts: Traditions, History, People. New York: Gallery Books. pp. 60, 265 (Wako), 210, 393 (Eku), 285–286 (PKA World Heavyweight Title). ISBN 978-0-8317-5805-9.
- Soet, John Steven (March 1990). "Jean-Claude van Damme". Inside Kung-Fu Presents: Martial Artists One on One. pp. 16–25.
- Zito, Chuck (2002). Street Justice. St. Martin's Press. ISBN 9780312320218.
