= Dona Oliveira =

- professional bodybuilder

Personal info
- Born: September 8, 1960; New Bedford, Massachusetts
- Died: December 7, 2018 (aged 58)

Best statistics
- Height: 5 ft 6 in (1.68 m)
- Weight: (In Season) 127-139 lb (Off-Season) 146-150 lb

Professional (Pro) career
- Pro-debut: IFBB World Games; 1985
- Best win: IFBB Women's World Pro Champion; 1988
- Predecessor: Bev Francis
- Successor: Diana Dennis
- Active: Retired 1991

Dona Oliveira (September 8, 1960 – December 7, 2018) was a professional female bodybuilder from the United States. She competed from the mid-1980s through the early 1990s.

== Biography ==
Like many other women, Dona first started exercising to get in better shape. At a young age she joined a Nautilus gym and trained for twenty minutes, three times a week as she had been told. At the time she had no desire to develop the type of bodies of the female bodybuilders of her time or even compete. Dona felt that the well developed physiques of female bodybuilders were "too much". But Oliveira soon became frustrated with her exercise routines; she enjoyed the little pump she got from her training, but was disappointed with the minimal change she saw in her physique. This soon changed when Dona got a look at some bodybuilding magazines and was able to see top women bodybuilders such as Rachel McLish and Mary Roberts. While she had no intentions of training for competition purposes, Oliveira knew that she wanted more of the shape and muscle tone she saw on the photos of those magazines.

Dona began training with Saul Friedman, a powerlifter friend in his basement gym and soon saw results. Saul also set a goal for her to compete in a local bodybuilding contest. Four months later after she started training with heavy weights, Oliveira entered her first bodybuilding show and placed second. The following year she won several shows and switched to the NPC on the advice of some friends. She continued to win shows and quickly became a pro within two years. Her highest achievements in amateur competition were winning the 1984 East Coast Championships, the 1985 NPC USA Championship, and NPC World Games in London, England. As a professional, she won the 1988 IFBB Pro World Championships in Nice, France, and placed 6th at the IFBB Ms. Olympia in the same year (originally she placed 7th, but was later awarded 6th place when Tonya Knight was disqualified).

== Bodybuilding philosophy ==
Oliveira's training consisted of simple compound movements with mostly free weights with few cable and machine exercises. She focused on a combination of powerlifting exercises such as squats, bench presses, and deadlifts with bodybuilding exercises such as shoulder presses, laterals raises, dumbbell flyes, and barbell rows. During her competitive days she typically trained on a three-day split routine (three days on, one day off) during the off-season, training up to three bodyparts per training session. During the contest season she would switch to a four-day split routine (four days on, one day off) to focus on her weak points; during the contest season she would train one or two bodyparts. Dona was a strong believer in the idea that the psychological aspect of bodybuilding was just as important as the physical aspect of it, and felt that goal setting was important to develop her physique.

== Contest history ==
- 1983 AAU Massachusetts State Championships - 1st
- 1984 NPC East Coast Championships - 1st
- 1984 NPC Nationals - 4th (MW)
- 1985 NPC USA Championship - 1st (MW & overall)
- 1985 IFBB World Games - 1st
- 1985 IFBBMs. Olympia - 17th
- 1986 IFBB Pro World Championships - 9th
- 1986 IFBB Ms. Olympia - 17th
- 1988 IFBB Pro World Championships - 1st
- 1988 IFBB Ms. Olympia - 6th
- 1989 IFBB Ms. Olympia - 12th
- 1990 IFBB Ms. Olympia - 16th
- 2007 NPC Southern States-Figure Class A-5th
- 2014 IFBB Tampa Pro - Women's Physique Division - 16th
