= Anja Langer =

German bodybuilder (born 1965)

- professional bodybuilder

Personal info
- Nickname: The Angel, German Angel
- Born: June 3, 1965 (age 59); Stuttgart, West Germany

Best statistics
- Height: 5 ft 6 in (1.68 m)
- Weight: (In Season) 137 lb (62 kg) (Off-Season) 143 lb (65 kg)

Professional (Pro) career
- Pro-debut: World Pro Championships; 1987
- Best win: Ms. Olympia 2nd place.; 1988
- Predecessor: Ellen Van Maris
- Successor: Sandy Riddell
- Active: Retired 1989

Anja Langer (born June 3, 1965) is a German former professional female bodybuilder of the late 1980s. Her career peaked in 1988 when she placed second at the 1988 Ms. Olympia.

== Biography ==
Anja was born in 1965 in Stuttgart in Southern Germany, where she grew up in the nearby town of Böblingen. Langer grew up in a house near a forest and at a young age she did a lot of outdoor activities. Because of this she developed a passion for nature and the outdoors. As an active child, her first passion was gymnastics. She competed at the age of eight in several gymnastic competitions and was successful. She also took part in horseback-riding competitions since her family own two horses and became part of a horseback-riding club. During this time Anja became more involved with different types of sports that captured her curiosity. She tried diving at the age of fourteen and jazz dance soon after. It was during this time, at the age of fifteen that she was introduced to bodybuilding by her first boyfriend.

She began weight training in 1980, at a local gym near her home in Germany. At the time she was the only girl weight training at the gym. This did not bother her since all the men at the gym were impressed by how strong she was. Little by little she increased her training, she put more attention to her diet and decided to compete in her first bodybuilding competition. In 1981 she competed in the Baden-Württemberg Championships and placed second to last. Langer was not discouraged and decided to train harder and competed again in the same contest and placed second. At this time bodybuilding was still a hobby for her and her parents, who disagreed with her bodybuilding, wanted it to remain that way. Because of this Anja had to keep her competition preparations a secret. It was later that her parents accepted her passion for bodybuilding and respected their daughter's career of interest.

In school she studied graphic art, while still competing regularly. When she completed school, Langer decided to make her hobby her profession during this time. She placed fourth at the German Championships, second Amateur World Championship in Madrid, Spain. In 1985, she won the Junior World Championships, and the European Amateur Championships and German Championships in 1986. After turning pro, Langer decided that her main goal as professional was to win the Ms. Olympia title, but 1987 was a difficult year for Anja. Her father died in that year and because of this she was unable to fully focus on her bodybuilding preparations. Despite this she was able to get second at World Pro Championships, and second at the Olympia. After placing second at the Olympia, Langer decided to put her competitive career on hold. She decided to take a whole year off and compete again at the 1990 Ms. Olympia in hopes of winning that show.

However, she was unable to compete due to an unexpected pregnancy. Despite this she still trained while pregnant to maintain her musculature and compete after the end of her pregnancy. In January 1991, Anja Langer gave birth to her son, who she named Elija. Afterwards she put bodybuilding aside and worked with Bill Reynolds to write her book about bodybuilding, exercise and nutrition called Body Flex-Body Magic. The book was released in 1992 in the United States. She also returned to the bodybuilding stage as a guest poser showing a smaller frame than she had during her competitive days. During 1993 and 1994 she took part in two theatrical performances that were held in Stuttgart, Germany. From 1995 through 1998 she owned a gym and later turned to personal training, fitness consulting and modelling. In 2000, she decided to return to the public eye of bodybuilding and took on the role as a spokesperson for bodybuilding as a healthy sport. Langer was inducted into the 2011 IFBB Hall of Fame.

== Vital statistics ==
- Full Name: Anja Langer
- Birthday: June 3
- Place of Birth: Stuttgart, Germany
- Current state of Residence: Stuttgart, Germany
- Occupation: personal trainer, fitness model, actress, professional bodybuilder, fitness consultant, author
- Marital Status: Married to Roy.
- Height: 5'6"
- Weight (In Season): 140 lbs. (Off-Season):144lbs.
- Eye Color: Blue
- Hair Color: Blonde

== Bodybuilding philosophy ==
Langer's training philosophy mainly consisted of a combination compound, and isolation exercises (mostly done with free weights and a small number of machines and cables). She trained with the traditional push and pull routine (three days on, one day off). Anja focuses on her Chest, Back, in order to bring her upper body to match her strong legs. She believes that proper form is very important and often avoids extreme heavy weights.

== Contest history ==
- 1981 Baden-Württemberg Championships - Did not Place
- 1982 Baden-Württemberg Championships - 2nd
- 1983 NPC German Championships - 4th
- 1984 NPC Amateur World Championship - 2nd (with a partner)
- 1985 NPC Junior World Championships - 1st
- 1986 IFBB European Amateur Championships - 1st (HW)
- 1986 IFBB German Championships - 1st (MW & overall)
- 1987 IFBB Ms. Olympia - 4th
- 1987 IFBB World Pro Championships - 2nd
- 1988 IFBB Ms. Olympia - 2nd

== See also ==
- List of female bodybuilders
- List of female fitness & figure competitors
