= Gladys Portugues =

American bodybuilder and actress

- Born: Gladys Portugues; September 30, 1957 (age 68); Manhattan, New York, U.S
- Occupations: American bodybuilder; fitness model; actress; author
- Years active: 1980–present
- Spouses: Jean-Claude Van Damme (m. 1987; div. 1992) (m. 1999)
- Children: 2

Gladys Portugues (born September 30, 1957) is an American former professional female bodybuilder and actress. As a bodybuilder, Gladys placed twice in the top 10 in the Ms. Olympia contest. Gladys is married to Belgian actor and martial artist Jean-Claude Van Damme.

== Personal life ==
Born of Puerto Rican parents, Gladys has said that she was inspired to start her own bodybuilding and weight training regimen while attending Marymount Manhattan College, when Gladys saw Rachel McLish on television winning the Ms. Olympia title.

In 1987, at the age of 30, Gladys married Belgian martial artist and actor Jean-Claude Van Damme (born Jean-Claude van Varenberg). The couple divorced in 1992, then remarried in 1999. They have two kids: Kristopher van Varenberg (b.1987) and Bianca Brigitte (b.1990).

== Filmography ==
Year	Title	Role	Notes
1985	Pumping Iron II: The Women	Herself	Cinecom International Films
1986	The Morning After	Bodybuilder	20th Century Fox
1987	It's Alive III: Island of the Alive	Waitress	Larco Productions Inc.

=== TV ===
Year	Title	Episodes	Role
2011	Behind Closed Doors	1 season (8 episodes)	Herself

== Books ==
- Hard Bodies Express, Portugues, Dell; Reissue 1988, ISBN 0-440-53426-7
- Hard Bodies, Portugues and Vedral, Dell; Reissue edition 1986, ISBN 0-440-53424-0
