= Bev Francis =

Australian bodybuilder and powerlifter

- Professional bodybuilder
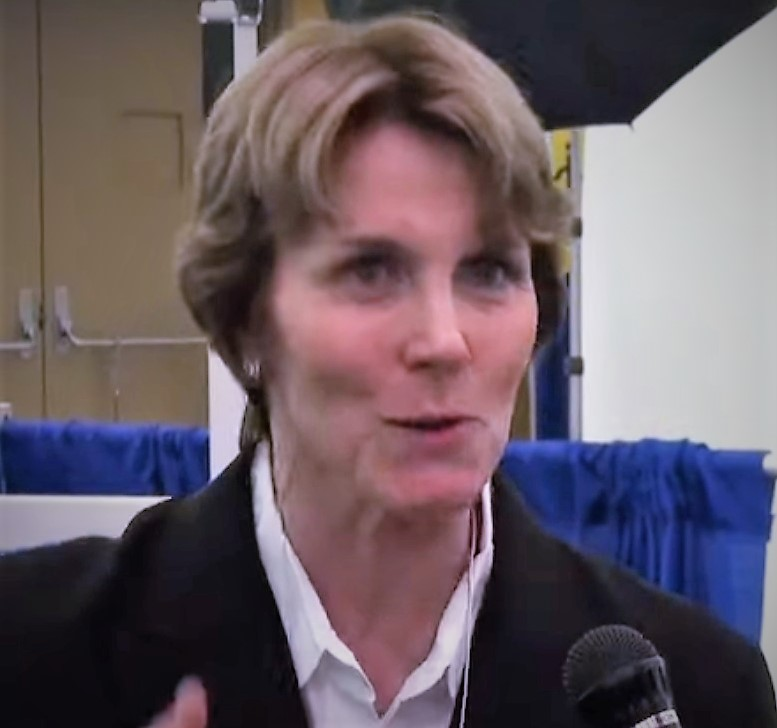
- Francis interviewed in 2011

Personal info
- Born: Beverley May Francis; 15 February 1955 (age 71); Geelong, Victoria, Australia

Best statistics
- Height: 5 ft 5 in (1.65 m)
- Weight: 160 lb (73 kg)

Professional (Pro) career
- Pro-debut: Caesars World Cup; 1983
- Best win: IFBB World Pro Championships; 1987
- Predecessor: Juliette Bergmann
- Successor: Dona Oliveira
- Active: Retired 1991

Bev Francis
Medal record

Women's powerlifting

Representing Australia

IPF Women's World Powerlifting Championships
Gold medal – first place	1980 Lowell	75 kg (165 lb)
Gold medal – first place	1981 Honolulu	82.5 kg (182 lb)
Gold medal – first place	1982 Birmingham	75 kg (165 lb)
Gold medal – first place	1983 Adelaide	82.5 kg (182 lb)
Gold medal – first place	1984 Santa Monica	82.5 kg (182 lb)
Gold medal – first place	1985 Vienna	82.5 kg (182 lb)

Beverley "Bev" Francis (born 15 February 1955) is an Australian gym owner and retired professional bodybuilder, powerlifter, and national shot put champion.

== Early life ==
Beverley Francis was born on 15 February 1955 in Geelong, Victoria, the youngest of five children. As a child she dreamed of playing football.

She attended Bell Park Secondary College graduating in 1972. In 1976, she graduated from the University of Melbourne, where she obtained a degree in physical education and a teaching diploma. She then worked as a high school physical education and mathematics teacher for eight years.

== Career ==
=== Shot put ===
As a teenager, Francis became an accomplished shot putter. In February 1974, she began serious training. In 1977, she broke the Australian shot put record. From 1977 to 1979 and 1981 to 1982, she was an Australian track and field team member. She missed the 1980 track season due to a knee injury. In 1982, she won the Australian national shot put championships. Along with shot put, she performed the discus throw, javelin throw, and 100 meter reserve.

At Melbourne University while weight training with notable track and field coach Franz Stampfl, she developed an strong interest in lifting.

=== Powerlifting ===
In 1980, Francis held all world records in the 82.5 kg (182 lb) weight class. At the 1981 World Powerlifting Championships, she set a world record when she bench pressed 150 kg (330 lb), the first woman's bench press over 300 lb. At the 1982 Australian Powerlifting Championships in Adelaide, she set a world record in the 82.5 kg (182 lb) class with a squat of 216 kg (476 lb). She won gold medals in her weight class in the International Powerlifting Federation Championships from 1980 to 1985.

==== Best lifts ====
- Squat – 500 lb (230 kg)
- Bench press – 335 lb (152 kg)
- Deadlift – 509.27 lb (231.00 kg)

=== Bodybuilding ===
==== Professional career ====
After becoming the first woman to bench press over 300 lb (140 kg), a picture of Francis striking a most muscular pose, or "the crab", while wearing a bikini appeared in several bodybuilding magazines around the world. She possessed far more muscular size than the most muscular female bodybuilders at the time. Her powerlifting accolade led to her being invited by producer George Butler to take part in the film Pumping Iron II: The Women, which was being shot around the Cesar's World Cup being held in Las Vegas in December 1983. At that contest, she said she should have been "first or last". She placed in the middle as 8th among 15 competitors. Disappointed with the results, she attempted to reinvent her physique along the lines of what was being rewarded, especially after hearing that she was "too muscular" for the judges' tastes.

Francis guest-posed at the 1985 Mr. Olympia competition, igniting the audience. She finished 10th in her Ms. Olympia debut in 1986. In 1987, she won the World Pro Championships. She followed up with three 3rd-place finishes at the Ms. Olympia in 1987, 1988, and 1989, then moved into 2nd place at the Ms. Olympia in 1990 (as runner-up to Lenda Murray). She had overhauled her physique radically from that 1983 Cesar's World Cup, when she was told she was "too muscular", but at the 1990 Olympia she was told she was "not muscular enough" to top Murray. Determined to win their next meeting, she resolved to build the most densely muscled physique ever seen on a female up to that point.

==== Ms. Olympia 1991 ====
The 1991 Ms. Olympia contest was the first to be televised live by ESPN, broadcasting a women's bodybuilding contest to the largest audience ever at the time (and contributing to the ensuing controversy). To facilitate the network's needs, the competition was held over two days. Rounds one (symmetry) and two (muscularity) were held on Saturday evening, 12 October 1991, whilst rounds three (posing) and four (posedown) were conducted 24 hours later, with the Sunday night proceedings broadcast live. At the prejudging, Francis walked out with 160 lb (73 kg) of dense and conditioned muscles stacked on her 5 ft 5 in (1.65 m) frame. The audience gasped—none had seen such musculature on a woman before. Almost all the competitors came in considerably larger than at the last competition, surprising not just the mainstream ESPN viewers, but some bodybuilding fans as well. The defending champion Murray was herself 11 lb heavier than the previous year.

At the end of the first night's judging, Francis led the field, four points ahead of Murray. On the second night, just before the start of the final two rounds, ESPN (in an unprecedented move for professional bodybuilding) flashed up the half-time scores for their national audience and those inside the Shrine Auditorium to see Francis in the lead. Since the posing rounds had never been recognised as opportunities for a lagging competitor to come from behind, most insiders, including Francis herself, predicted that she only had to avoid falling over to take the title. However, at the conclusion of the second night's events, as Francis stood onstage holding hands with Murray, she was announced in 2nd place, with a score of 31 points to Murray's 32. Francis's hand rose halfway to her face in shock before she regained her composure, smiled, and congratulated Murray. This was the slimmest margin of victory yet for a Ms. Olympia win, with Murray edging Francis by only one point. The audience and commentators were thrown off by this result, since Francis was in the lead after the first two (more contentious) rounds, only to be overtaken somehow in the concluding set.

It was usually suggested that the IFBB and ESPN leadership did not want a woman carrying more muscle mass than most middleweight men to be recognised as the planet's premier female bodybuilder, and instructed the judges to swing the contest in Murray's favor. Such interference was not unheard of in the male competition (most controversially at the 1980 Mr. Olympia). A few months later, the IFBB issued a new policy announcement warning that excessive overt muscularity would be marked down, sparking persistent debate over the subjective criteria and "how much is too much". Francis retired afterwards, citing disgust over her controversial loss. She stated in 1993:

You know when I came in as the most muscular competitor at that 1983 Caesar's Palace contest I said I should have been first or last. The same should have applied at the 1991 Ms. Olympia. After being in the lead with only the posing and posedown to go I still can't believe I lost that contest. In my heart and in my mind I can't motivate myself to compete in another bodybuilding contest. The fire for competition is no longer there. I have no bitterness. Bodybuilding gave me a great life and I'm thankful for that.

==== Body image and judging criteria ====
Francis and her career played a significant role in the concurrent turmoil over ideals of form (especially regarding muscle mass) and judging criteria for female bodybuilders, which often relied on vague, contentious, and shifting notions of a "feminine" figure. Her 1983 debut in the made-for-film Cesar's World Cup received much attention for potentially pushing the sport in a more muscular direction. Feminist icon Gloria Steinem commented that her performance "redefined the boundaries of femininity". However, when she placed 8th, her loss led her to spend years changing her look in an attempt to meet the apparent ideal preferred by the judges.

Despite years of attempting to achieve higher scores on the femininity aspect of the contests with measures including a nose job, hair bleaching, and slimming down her physique by losing muscle, Francis still failed to take first place at the major competitions. However, after successfully developing methods of achieving a more symmetrical physique while maintaining the size built from her powerlifting background (the three power lifts are central to bodybuilding, and bodybuilders with backgrounds as champion powerlifters tend to have tremendous size and density for their frames), she won the World Championship in 1987. She continued to experiment with her physique, leading to a disappointing 1990 Ms. Olympia. There, she was criticised as not having the fullness or muscularity compared to winner Lenda Murray, and subsequently worked on becoming as massive and symmetrical as possible for the 1991 Olympia. After the ensuing 2nd-place finish and resulting controversy, she retired from bodybuilding.

Marcia Pally, in a 1985 article on the film Pumping Iron II: The Women, had reported that people often thought of Francis as lesbian. Francis commented: "The categorization annoys me more than what I'm accused of. I've been called a transsexual, a man, and a lesbian. People have to stop putting together things that don't belong together. Muscles don't make a woman a lesbian."

=== Contest history ===
- 1983 Caesars World Cup – 8th
- 1984 IFBB Grand Prix Las Vegas – 8th
- 1986 IFBB Grand Prix Las Vegas – 3rd
- 1986 IFBB LA Pro Championship – 3rd
- 1986 IFBB Ms. International – 3rd
- 1986 IFBB Ms. Olympia – 10th
- 1987 IFBB Pro World Championship – 1st
- 1987 IFBB Ms. Olympia – 3rd
- 1988 IFBB Ms. Olympia – 3rd
- 1989 IFBB Ms. Olympia – 3rd
- 1990 IFBB Ms. Olympia – 2nd
- 1991 IFBB Ms. Olympia – 2nd

== Other work ==
Francis is the co-author of the book Bev Francis' Power Bodybuilding. She has also produced a training video titled Hardcore Training with World Champion Bev Francis. She has contributed articles to the monthly Female Bodybuilding magazine and has written for the men's magazines Flex, Iron Man, and Muscle & Fitness.

In 1985, Francis gained notice through her role in the movie Pumping Iron II: The Women. The movie featured her in the 1983 Caesars World Cup. The film casts her in a controversial role within the ongoing debate over femininity and female muscularity, with her naturally massive size and muscular development challenging preconceived notions about the limits of female bodybuilding.

Francis was featured in the 2001 TLC documentary The Greatest Bodies.

== Personal life ==
At the 1983 Caesars World Cup, Francis met IFBB judge and powerlifter Steve Weinberger. She moved in with him on Long Island, New York and they were married on 30 September 1984. They have a son and daughter together. In 1986, she and her husband opened Bev Francis' Bodybuilding Gym on Long Island. In 1990, they expanded the gym to Bev Francis Gold's Gym in Syosset, New York. In 2005, the gym's name was changed to Powerhouse Gym, Bev Francis. She and her husband lived in Syosset prior to their divorce. Bev is now back in Australia living in Geelong with her female partner Lee Johnson.

== Legacy ==
From 1981 to the early 1990s, Francis earned the accolade of "Strongest Woman in History". She was the first woman in the world to bench press over 300 lb (140 kg). She broke over 40 world powerlifting records and was undefeated during her powerlifting career. She was inducted into the International Powerlifting Federation Hall of Fame in 1987.

Francis was inducted into the IFBB Hall of Fame in 2000. She is also a judge for the International Federation of BodyBuilders (IFBB).
