= Diana Dennis =

American bodybuilder (born 1951)

- professional bodybuilder

Personal info
- Nickname: Di
- Born: July 21, 1951 (age 73); United States

Best statistics

Professional (Pro) career
- Pro-debut: IFBB World Amateur Mixed Pairs; 1985
- Best win: 1989 IFBB Pro World Champion; 1981-1989
- Active: Retired 1994

Diana Dennis (born July 21, 1951) is a former professional female bodybuilder from the United States.

== Biography ==
Dennis began competing in local contests in 1981. Her earliest success was in mixed pairs competition (where couples do synchronized posing routines to chosen music), with partner Kevin Lawrence. They won several titles, including the 1985 IFBB World Amateur competition. Dennis earned her pro card by winning the overall title at the 1985 NPC Nationals. She then established herself as one of the top professional competitors by finishing third in the Ms. Olympia later that year. She competed in a total of nine Ms. Olympia contests, finishing outside the top ten only once. As a pro, Dennis won the 1986 Los Angeles Pro Championship and the 1989 Pro World Championship. She was inducted into the IFBB Hall of Fame in 2001.

Dennis is retired from official competition, but still continues to train.

== Contest history ==
- 1981 The Shrine Amateur Grand Prix - 4th
- 1982 Saddleback Valley Muscle Classic - 1st (HW)
- 1982 California Muscle Classic - 1st (HW & overall)
- 1983 California Championships - 4th (HW)
- 1983 National Bodybuilding Fair Mixed Pairs - 2nd
- 1983 AFWB American Championships - 6th (HW)
- 1983 AFWB American Mixed Pairs - 1st
- 1983 NPC National Championships - 1st (HW)
- 1984 Orange County Muscle Classic - 1st (HW & overall)
- 1984 IFBB Pro-Am Mixed Pairs - 4th
- 1984 NPC USA Championship - 2nd (HW)
- 1984 NPC Nationals - 2nd (HW)
- 1985 IFBB Pro-Am Mixed Pairs - 4th
- 1985 NPC Nationals - 1st (HW & overall)
- 1985 IFBB World Amateur Mixed Pairs - 1st
- 1985 IFBB Ms. Olympia - 3rd
- 1986 IFBB Pro World Championship - 2nd
- 1986 IFBB Pro-Am Mixed Pairs - 2nd
- 1986 Los Angeles Pro Championship - 1st
- 1986 IFBB Ms. Olympia - 4th
- 1987 IFBB Pro World Championship - 4th
- 1987 IFBB Ms. Olympia - 8th
- 1989 IFBB Pro World Championship - 1st
- 1989 USA vs. USSR Invitational - 2nd
- 1989 IFBB Ms. Olympia - 7th
- 1990 IFBB Ms. Olympia - 7th
- 1991 IFBB Ms. Olympia - 6th
- 1992 IFBB Ms. Olympia - 5th
- 1993 IFBB Ms. Olympia - 15th
- 1994 IFBB Ms. Olympia - 10th
