= Ellen van Maris =

Dutch bodybuilder

- Professional bodybuilder

Personal info
- Nickname: Dutch Dynamo
- Born: 1957 (age 68–69); Amstelveen, the Netherlands

Best statistics

Professional (Pro) career
- Pro-debut: IFBB European Women's World Amateurs Championships; 1984
- Best win: IFBB Ms. Olympia Runner-Up; 1987
- Predecessor: Clare Furr
- Successor: Anja Langer
- Active: Unofficially retired in 1989

Ellen van Maris (born 1957 in Amstelveen) is a former professional female bodybuilder from the Netherlands.

== Biography ==
Van Maris competed at the local and national level in the Netherlands for two years, before earning her pro card by winning the lightweight class at the Women's World Amateur Championship in 1984. She then competed for six consecutive years in the Ms. Olympia contests, never finishing lower than ninth. Her best showing came in 1987, when she finished second behind Cory Everson. Van Maris was inducted into the IFBB Hall of Fame in 2004.

== Contest history ==
- 1982 Randstad Championships - 3rd
- 1982 Grand Prix, Netherlands - 5th
- 1982 Dutch Championships - 2nd
- 1982 European Grand Prix - 2nd
- 1983 Grand Prix, Brussels - 3rd
- 1983 Grand Prix, Netherlands - 1st
- 1983 European Championships - 4th
- 1984 European Championships - 3rd
- 1984 Dutch Nationals - 1st
- 1984 Women's World Amateurs - 1st (LW)
- 1984 IFBB Ms. Olympia - 9th
- 1985 IFBB Ms. Olympia - 7th
- 1986 IFBB Ms. Olympia - 3rd
- 1987 IFBB Ms. Olympia - 2nd
- 1988 IFBB Ms. Olympia - 5th
- 1989 IFBB Ms. Olympia - 5th
