= Carla Dunlap-Kaan =

American bodybuilding champion (born 1954)

- Professional bodybuilder

Personal info
- Born: October 22, 1954 (age 71); Newark, New Jersey, U.S.

Best statistics
- Height: 5 ft 3 in (1.60 m)
- Weight: 126 lb (57 kg)

Professional (Pro) career
- Pro-debut: Best In The World; 1979
- Best win: IFBB Ms. Olympia Champion; 1983
- Predecessor: Rachel McLish
- Successor: Cory Everson
- Active: Retired 1993

Carla Dunlap-Kaan (born October 22, 1954) is a professional American female bodybuilding champion.

== Early life and education ==
Dunlap was born in 1954, in Newark, New Jersey. She started competing in sports with gymnastics at age 10. She later competed in swimming, both speed and synchronized. Dunlap attended the Newark School of Fine and Industrial Art on a full scholarship, earning a degree in Advertising Design. She won the gold medal in synchronized swimming in the 1977 Junior National Team Championships, and a bronze medal at the inaugural National Sports Festival in 1978.

== Bodybuilding career ==
In 1979, Dunlap decided to enter the "Best in the World" bodybuilding contest at the suggestion of Steve Wennerstrom. She had never trained for bodybuilding, but still placed fifth among 45 entrants. She started training seriously for bodybuilding the following March, and was soon competing successfully in top level amateur contests. She won the NPC Nationals in 1981, and 1982. Her most successful year of competition was 1983 when she won three pro shows, including the Ms. Olympia contest (she had lost the Ms. Olympia to Rachel McLish by two points in 1982). In addition to her individual accomplishments, Dunlap won the World Professional Mixed Pairs title in 1984 and 1988 with Tony Pearson. Dunlap is the only female bodybuilder to have competed in the 1970s, 1980s, and 1990s. In January 1999, Dunlap was inducted into the IFBB Hall of Fame. In June 2009, she was inducted in to the AOBS Hall Of Fame (Association of Oldetime Barbell and Strongmen).

Away from the contest stage, Dunlap appeared in the bodybuilding documentaries Women Of Iron (1984, with fellow competitor Deborah Diana) and Pumping Iron II: The Women (1985). She was selected by ABC to represent women's bodybuilding in the women's Superstars competition in 1984, where she finished seventh in a field of eleven competitors. Dunlap was a regular on ESPN's BodyShaping series from 1990 to 1995. She has also appeared as a color commentator on bodybuilding and fitness telecasts for NBC, U.S., and ESPN.

=== Contest history ===
- 1979 IFBB Best In The World - 5th
- 1980 AAU Ms. America #1 - 1st
- 1980 Eastern Cup - 1st
- 1980 Ms. Atlantic Shore - 2nd
- 1980 Bodybuilding Expo I - 1st
- 1980 NPC USA Championship - 9th
- 1980 NPC Nationals - 3rd
- 1981 World Games I - 4th (MW)
- 1981 NPC USA Championship - 2nd (HW)
- 1981 NPC Nationals - 1st (HW and overall)
- 1981 Pro World Championship - 4th
- 1981 Night of Champions - 1st
- 1982 Super Bowl of Bodybuilding I - 1st
- 1982 AFWB American Championships - 1st (HW and overall)
- 1982 Swedish Grand Prix - 1st
- 1982 NPC USA Championship - 2nd (HW)
- 1982 NPC Nationals - 1st (HW and overall)
- 1982 IFBB Ms. Olympia - 2nd
- 1982 Pro World Championship - 1st
- 1983 IFBB Ms. Olympia - 1st
- 1983 IFBB Caesars World Cup (Grand Prix Las Vegas) - 1st
- 1984 Pro World Championship - 2nd
- 1984 IFBB Ms. Olympia - 4th
- 1985 IFBB Ms. Olympia - 4th
- 1986 IFBB Ms. Olympia - 9th
- 1987 IFBB Ms. Olympia - 12th
- 1988 Pro World Championship - 10th
- 1988 IFBB Ms. Olympia - 9th (originally 10th)
- 1993 Ms. International - 13th

Ms. Olympia
Preceded by: Rachel McLish	First (1983)	Succeeded by: Cory Everson
