= Mary Roberts (bodybuilder) =

American bodybuilder

- professional bodybuilder

Personal info
- Born: March 17, 1950 (age 75); United States

Best statistics

Professional (Pro) career
- Pro-debut: NPC Junior National Figure Championships
- Best win: 1985 Pro World Champion; 1985
- Active: Retired 1987

Mary Roberts was one of the top professional female bodybuilders of the 1980s. She possessed a classic short (5-3), thick physique featuring an overwhelming upper body even as a lightweight. Roberts big arms, deltoids and chest with her mature looks and flashing, almost challenging dark eyes projected a very powerful, confident aura onstage.

A three-page photospread in Muscle & Fitness magazine's September 1982 issue on various female bodybuilder physique types used Roberts, doing a side chest pose in a blue leotard, to epitomize the most heavily muscled physique. The copy quoted famed male bodybuilder Casey Viator as calling Roberts physique "awesome." In its advance story on the 1984 Ms. Olympia, Strength Training for Beauty noted that the 1984 Worlds turned into a contest between the "hypermuscular" women such as Roberts and winner Lori Bowen and the more middle-of-the-road women such as 1983 Ms. Olympia Carla Dunlap (who was among the most muscular just two years earlier). Bowen's and Roberts' placings were seen as a sign that size would be rewarded by women's bodybuilding judging more than it had been in the sport's infant years. When the 1984 Ms. Olympia continued this trend—winner Cory Everson was the tallest (5-8) and heaviest (148 pounds) competitor, brought very broad shoulders and large thighs—Roberts third-place placing brought some controversy. Roberts actually finished tied with 1980 and 1982 Ms. Olympia Rachel McLish, who hadn't competed in the 1983 Olympia, but McLish got second on a tiebreaker. The pure visual facts known and seen by everyone that day attending was Mary Roberts earned second place deserved second place and it was taken away by politics. The gains in size, fullness, density by pro women in the two years since McLish's narrow win over the more muscular Dunlap (now in the middle muscularity bell curve where McLish had been two years before) were apparent. Dunlap was quoted by one magazine as being surprised McLish, 5-6, 12 placed so high. The Judges knew that this was McLish's last debut on stage. However, no one else meaning the fans didn't know for sure it was McLish's last contest, the assumption by many fans was the placing was a good-bye gift for being such an icon for the fledgling sport. In 1985, Roberts rebounded to take the Women's Pro World Championship. The July 1985 issue of Strength Training for Beauty featured an article that focused on Roberts reputation as "bodybuilding's bitch," a confident woman, self-assured, tough to deal with by photographers and peers. The largest picture with the article showed Roberts spoofing her reputation by sitting wearing an expansive black women's dress hat, black gloves and black bikini while sitting in a well-appointed chair. If anyone didn't get the reference to Joan Collins' Alexis Carrington character from the television hit Dynasty, the photo caption pointed it out. Roberts was considered the Quintessential Classic Beauty of 1980s pop culture. Roberts placed second to Everson in the 1985 Ms. Olympia.

== Contest history ==
- 1981 AFWB American Championships - 1st (LW)
- 1981 NPC Nationals - 1st (LW and overall)
- 1983 IFBB Pro World Championship - 5th
- 1984 IFBB Pro World Championship - 3rd
- 1984 IFBB Ms. Olympia - 3rd
- 1985 IFBB Pro World Championship - 1st
- 1985 IFBB Ms. Olympia - 2nd
- 1986 IFBB Los Angeles Pro Championship - 5th
- 1986 IFBB Ms. Olympia - 5th
