= Corinna Everson =

American bodybuilder (born 1958)

- Professional bodybuilder

Personal info
- Full name: Corinna Kneuer Everson
- Born: January 4, 1958 (age 68); Racine, Wisconsin, US

Best statistics
- Height: 5 ft 10 in (1.78 m)
- Weight: On-season: 155–160 lb (70–73 kg); Off-season: 160–165 lb (73–75 kg)

Professional (Pro) career
- Pro-debut: IFBB North American; 1982
- Best win: Ms. Olympia six consecutive times (undefeated); 1984–1989
- Predecessor: Carla Dunlap
- Successor: Lenda Murray
- Active: Retired 1989

Corinna "Cory" Everson (née Kneuer; born January 4, 1958) is an American female bodybuilding champion and actress. Widely regarded as the first superstar of female bodybuilding, Everson won the Ms. Olympia contest six years in a row from 1984 to 1989.

== Education ==
Corinna Kneuer was born in Racine, Wisconsin and attended high school in Deerfield, Illinois. She attended the University of Wisconsin–Madison, where she was a multi-sport standout (gymnastics, track & field and badminton).

== Early career ==
While attending the University of Wisconsin–Madison, she met Jeff Everson, a competitive bodybuilder who worked there as a strength coach. They married in 1982. While they were married, the Eversons built a successful mail-order clothing business called Sampson and Delilah.

== Bodybuilding career ==
Everson began to train seriously as a bodybuilder after her graduation, and made rapid progress. In the early years, she and her husband trained at Ernie's Gym on Sherman Avenue in Madison. She won the Ms. Olympia bodybuilding contest at her first participation and remained undefeated from 1984 to 1989 when she retired from competition.

=== Contest history ===
- 1980 Ms. Mid America - 1st (tall and overall)
- 1980 American Couples - 3rd (with Jeff Everson)
- 1981 Ms. Midwest Open - 1st (tall & overall)
- 1981 Ms. Central USA - 1st (HW and overall)
- 1981 Couples America - 1st (with Jeff Everson)
- 1981 American Championships - 11th (MW)
- 1982 Ms. East Coast - 1st (MW)
- 1982 Bodybuilding Expo III - 2nd (MW)
- 1982 Bodybuilding Expo Couples - 2nd (with Jeff Everson)
- 1982 AFWB American Championships - 5th (HW)
- 1982 IFBB North American - 1st (MW and overall)
- 1982 IFBB North American Mixed Pairs - 1st
- 1983 Bodybuilding Expo IV - 1st (MW and overall)
- 1983 Bodybuilding Expo Mixed Pairs - 1st
- 1983 U.S. Bodybuilding Championships Couples - 1st (with Jeff Everson)
- 1983 AFWB American Championships - 8th (HW)
- 1983 NPC Nationals - 2nd (HW)
- 1984 American Women's Championships - 1st (HW and overall)
- 1984 NPC Nationals - 1st (HW and overall)
- 1984 IFBB Ms. Olympia - 1st
- 1985 IFBB Ms. Olympia - 1st
- 1986 IFBB Ms. Olympia - 1st
- 1987 IFBB Ms. Olympia - 1st
- 1988 IFBB Ms. Olympia - 1st
- 1989 IFBB Ms. Olympia - 1st

== Awards and honors ==
In January 1999, Everson was inducted into the IFBB Hall of Fame as part of the inaugural group. She was inducted into the Muscle Beach Venice Bodybuilding Hall of Fame on September 5, 2005. At the 2007 Arnold Classic, she became the first woman to be presented with the Lifetime Achievement Award, and in 2008 she was inducted into the National Fitness Hall of Fame. In 2012, she was inducted into the International Sports Hall of Fame.

== Film and television career ==
After retiring from competition, Everson turned to acting with her first major movie appearance being Double Impact (1991) alongside Jean-Claude Van Damme. She took a minor role in Natural Born Killers (1994). Then in Ballistic (1995), she reprised the evil musclewoman role, losing the final fight to Marjean Holden playing an undercover cop. Everson has made a number of guest appearances in television series, most notably playing Atalanta on Hercules: The Legendary Journeys. She appeared in two episodes of The Adventures of Brisco County, Jr. with her sister, Cameo Kneuer. In 1991, Everson appeared on the game show To Tell the Truth. Everson was the original host of the fitness show BodyShaping, which she also produced. She also hosted her own exercise show on ESPN, Cory Everson's Gotta Sweat, for seven years.

=== Film ===
Year	Title	Role	Notes
1986	The Morning After	Miss Olympia	
1989	The Girl from Outer Space	Lab Guard #1	
1991	Double Impact	Kara	
1994	Natural Born Killers	TV Mallory Knox	
1995	Ballistic	Claudia	
1996	Felony	Sondra	
1997	Sacred Trust	Grace Larson	
1999	My Favorite Martian	SETI Guard	Uncredited

=== Television ===
Year	Title	Role	Notes	
1991	To Tell the Truth	Herself	Contestant	
1993	The Adventures of Brisco County, Jr.	Katrina Schwenke	Episodes: "No Man's Land" and "Steel Horses"	
1994	Renegade	Aurora	Episode: "Muscle Beach"	
1994	Lois & Clark: The New Adventures of Superman	Amazon Woman #1	Episode: "Wall of Sound"	
1995-1998	Hercules: The Legendary Journeys	Atalanta	Episodes: "Ares", "Let the Games Begin" and "If I Had a Hammer"	
1996	Goode Behavior		Episode: "Goode Sport"	
1996	Tarzan: The Epic Adventures	Mara	Episodes: "Tarzan's Return: Part 1" and "Part 2"	
1996	Strange Luck	Physik Receptionist	Episode: "Wrong Number"	
1997	Home Improvement	Herself	Episode: "Pump You Up"	
1998	Mortal Kombat: Conquest	Sheeva	Supporting Role	59 Episodes
2005	Charmed	Hulk Paige	Episode: "Hulkus Pocus"	

== Flight on 9/11 ==
On September 10, 2001 Corina was doing an appearance in Philadelphia. A day later, on September 11 she boarded a 7:30 AM United Airlines flight 95 from Philadelphia heading towards Los Angeles. As she mentioned in her 2026 9/11 anniversary post on FB, a few hours after takeoff her plane took an emergency landing in Chicago without clear reason. While waiting at the airport to get back on plane she mentioned all the TVs in the area were turned off and she saw police officers scurrying through the airport with dogs and long guns. No smiles, instead faces of concern and focus. She called her husband in LA who said to get out of the airport and get to her mom's house. Yet she finally understood what was going on. She never finished her flight that day.

== Personal life ==
She married Jeff Everson in 1982. They divorced in 1996; however, she continues to use Everson as her stage name. In 1998, she married Dr. Steve Donia, a dentist; they have two children whom they adopted from Russia. She became active with Nightlight Christian Adoptions, an adoption agency that brings orphans from Russia and Belarus to the US to stay with families looking to adopt a child.

Everson's sister, Cameo Kneuer, is a two-time Ms. National Fitness champion and a mainstay of the TV game series Knights and Warriors.

== Books authored ==
- Strength Training for Beauty Volume 3 - Number 1Runner's World Magazine Company (1986)
- Superflex: Ms. Olympia's Guide to Building a Strong & Sexy Body Contemporary Books (1987) ISBN 0-8092-4865-4 with Jeff Everson
- Back in Shape Houghton Mifflin Company (1991) ISBN 0-395-56272-4 with Stephen Hochschuler
- Cory Everson's Workout Perigee Trade (1991) ISBN 0-399-51684-0 with Jeff Everson
- Cory Everson's Fat-Free & Fit Perigee Trade (1994) ISBN 0-399-51858-4 with Carole Jacobs
- Cory Everson's Lifebalance Perigee Trade (1998) ISBN 0-399-52444-4

Ms. Olympia
Preceded by: Carla Dunlap	First (1984)	Succeeded by: Herself
Preceded by: Herself	Second (1985)	Succeeded by: Herself
Preceded by: Herself	Third (1986)	Succeeded by: Herself
Preceded by: Herself	Fourth (1987)	Succeeded by: Herself
Preceded by: Herself	Fifth (1988)	Succeeded by: Herself
Preceded by: Herself	Sixth (1989)	Succeeded by: Lenda Murray
