= Female bodybuilding =

Component of competitive bodybuilding

- Highest governing body: IFBB Professional League
- Nicknames: FB, FBB, WB, and WBB
- First contest: 1977, Canton, Ohio, US
- Registered players: 70 + (2005)

Characteristics
- Contact: No
- Team members: No teams
- Mixed-sex: No
- Type: Indoor
- Equipment: Bikinis
- Venue: Auditorium

Presence
- Country or region: Worldwide
- Olympic: No
- World Championships: 1983 – 2013
- Paralympic: No
- World Games: 1981, 1985, 1989, 1993, 2001, 2005 & 2009

Female bodybuilding is the female component of competitive bodybuilding. It began in the late 1970s, when women began to take part in bodybuilding competitions.

The most prestigious titles in female professional bodybuilding include the Ms. Olympia, Ms. Rising Phoenix and Masters Olympia.

== History ==
=== Origins ===
Female bodybuilding originally developed as an outgrowth of not only the late nineteenth-century European vaudeville and circus strongwomen acts, Bernarr Macfadden's turn of the century women's physique competitions, and the weightlifting of Abbye "Pudgy" Stockton, but also as an outgrowth of the men's bodybuilding. The contest formats of men's events during the 1950s to the mid-1970s had often been supplemented with either a women's beauty contest or bikini show. These shows "had little to do with women's bodybuilding as we know it today, but they did serve as beginning or, perhaps more properly, as a doormat for the development of future bodybuilding shows." Physique contests for women date back to at least the 1960s with contests like Miss Physique, Miss Body Beautiful U.S.A., W.B.B.G. and Miss Americana, I.F.B.B. Maria Elena Alberici, as listed in the Almanac of Women's Bodybuilding, won two national titles in one year: Miss Body Beautiful U.S.A. in 1972, promoted by Dan Lurie, and Miss Americana in 1972, promoted by Joe Weider. Mr. Olympia, Arnold Schwarzenegger was a judge at the Brooklyn Academy of Music in New York when Maria Elena Alberici (aka) Maria Lauren won Miss Americana. It was not until the late 1970s, after the advent of the feminist movement and female powerlifting events that women were seen as capable of competing in their own bodybuilding competitions.

Dan Lurie and Kellie Everts – the Beginning (From Dan Lurie’s Book “Heart of Steel” Dan Lurie with Dave Robson, Author House 2009 – Page 313) Dan Lurie wrote the following quote: Kellie Everts

"A young lady with a great physique, Kellie was as motivated to compete as any male bodybuilder I had worked with. I would promote her to the world and in doing this become the first publisher to profile a female bodybuilder. In 1974, I received a call from Esquire magazine photographer Jean-Paul Goude, asking me who I would recommend as a subject for an ‘Amazonian’ spread he was planning. I instantly told him, “Kellie Everts is your lady.” In my mind she was the only female bodybuilder around at the time. In fact she was the first real female bodybuilder ever, a fact not lost on me when I put her in my December 1974 MTI. That was the very first article any muscle magazine had done on a female bodybuilding up until then."

In 1974, Lurie had received an auspicious call from Esquire magazine photographer Jean-Paul Goude, asking him for who he would recommend as a subject for an ‘Amazonian’ spread he was planning. Lurie quickly told him, “Kellie Everts is your lady.” She appeared to be the only female bodybuilder at the time, perhaps the first real female bodybuilder ever. To quote Lurie:

"To my mind, one thing is for sure: she was the first female to break through to make women’s bodybuilding widely known to mainstream audiences."

Per Lurie, Kellie Everts appeared in July 1975 Esquire Magazine, “Muscle and Grit, Religion and Tit, That’s what Kellie Everts is Made of," featuring a woman flexing muscles and lifting weights just like the men did. It clearly created a sensation. Next, Kellie Everts appeared in the May 1977 issue of Playboy, hoisting a barbell in the air with her bikini flying off – Playboy had said women need not fear lifting weights would turn their muscles into “magic mountains,” and “To the barbells, girls!” Just six months after this, Henry McGhee presented his female bodybuilding contest which was designed to be like the men’s (Canton, Ohio, YMCA Nov. 1977)

After the Esquire article, Kellie had the appeared on several national TV shows: Mike Douglas, To Tell the Truth and important local shows, AM New York (three times, once with Arnold Schwarzenegger), AM Washington, Stanley Siegel (three times) – all prior to the first female bodybuilding shows. After the female bodybuilding shows started, she appeared on Real People 1979 (before Laura Combes) and with Lisa Lyon 1981, the Tom Snyder Show, both doing muscle posing routines. Kellie had published the first body building book by a woman titled "The Ultimate Woman" and Lisa had her book "Body Magic" the same year shortly after Kellie.

Kellie won many trophies during the 70’s "Golden Era" at the IFBB and WBBG Contests, winning Best Body over Anna Maria Alberici in Miss Americana 1972 (where Arnold Schwarzenegger was a judge) and second place, the same during 1974 – second place Miss Americana and Best Body at the Felt Forum with Arnold Schwarzenegger. She won Miss Body Beautiful USA 2nd place 1973 and first place 1974. There was also the Sports Illustrated article 1980 “Miss Well WHAT?” with many observations of female bodybuilding in 1979.

Later on Feb 2, 2007, the WBBG belatedly awarded Kellie Everts the title "Progenitor" - "The Woman who got female competitive body building started" and in August put her into their Hall of Fame, as the only female in the WBBG Hall of Fame.

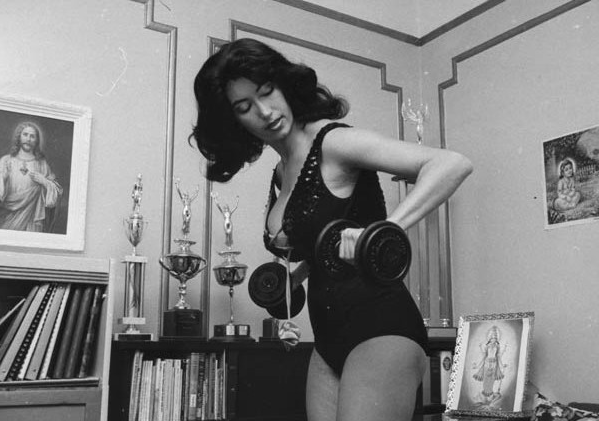
In 1979 Kellie Everts was the first female body building on national TV Show "Real People" - behind her some of her IFBB Miss Americana and WBBG Miss Body Beautiful trophies

=== 1977–1979 ===
Prior to 1977, bodybuilding had been considered strictly a male-oriented sport. Henry McGhee, described as the "primary architect of competitive female bodybuilding", was an employee of the Downtown Canton YMCA, carried a strong belief that women should share the opportunity to display their physiques and the results of their weight training the way men had done for years. The first official female bodybuilding competition was held in Canton, Ohio, in November 1977 and was called the Ohio Regional Women's Physique Championship. It was judged strictly as a bodybuilding contest and was the first event of its kind for women. Gina LaSpina, the champion, is considered the first recognized winner of a woman's bodybuilding contest. The event organizer, McGhee, told the competitors that they would be judged "like the men," with emphasis on muscular density, full muscle bellies, clear muscle separation, symmetry between the upper and lower body, and physique presentation. In 1978, McGhee organized the first National Women's Physique Championship, along with the short-lived United States Women's Physique Association (USWPA), which he formed to help organize women interested in competing in bodybuilding. The USWPA became defunct in 1980.

On August 18, 1979, promoter George Snyder organized a "female bodybuilding" contest known as The Best in the World contest, which was the first IFBB-sanctioned event for women that awarded prize money to the top finishers, with the winner receiving $2,500. It was considered the forerunner for the Ms. Olympia competition. Although sanctioned as a bodybuilding contest, women were required to appear on stage in high heels. Doris Barrilleaux found the Superior Physique Association (SPA) in 1978, the first women's bodybuilding organization run for women and by women. She also began publishing the SPA News, a newsletter dedicated exclusively to female bodybuilding. SPA disseminated information to women about contests and proper training and dieting. On April 29, 1979, SPA held Florida's first official women's contest in which thirteen women competed. The contest was held in Brandon Florida and promoted by Megas Gym and Doris Barrilleaux. The winner of the show was Laura Combes. Also in 1979, the IFBB formed the IFBB Women's Committee; Christine Zane was appointed the first chairperson to serve as head of the newly formed committee. One of the significant differences between the SPA and the IFBB was that while the IFBB was organized and run by men, the SPA was run by women and for women.

More contests started to appear in 1979. Some of these were the following:

- The second U.S. Women's National Physique Championship, won by Kay Baxter, with Marilyn Schriner second and Cammie Lusko third.
- The first IFBB Women's World Body Building Championship, held on June 16, won by Lisa Lyon, followed by Claudia Wilbourn, Stella Martinez, Stacey Bentley, and Bette Brown.
- The Best In The World contest, held at Warminster, Pennsylvania on August 18, featuring a $5,000 prize fund, with $2,500 awarded for first place. Patsy Chapman was the winner, followed by April Nicotra, Bentley, Brown, and Carla Dunlap. (Levin, 1980)
- The Robby Robinson Classic, held at the Embassy Auditorium in Los Angeles on August 25. Bentley finished first, also winning best legs and best poser, followed by Brown, Lusko, and Georgia Miller. (Roark, 2005)

Although these early events were regarded as bodybuilding contests, the women wore high-heeled shoes, and did not clench their fists while posing. Additionally, they were not allowed to use the three so-called "men's poses" — the double biceps, crab, and lat spread. The contests were generally held by promoters acting independently; the sport still lacked a governing body. That would change in 1980.

In 1979 Maria Shriver, the future wife of Arnold Schwarzenegger, produced a nine minute documentary on Kellie Everts (see "Origins" section above), which featured her praying in a Church, training in a gym, and preaching/strip teasing at a Club. It was the most popular presentation of that month at the station in Baltimore, Maryland.

Of Kellie’s many books, there are three (all available on LULU and Amazon) that cover her body building days. They are:

1) “The Man Whisperer” (2024 page 110 with rare photos) – which gives a Time Table of all she did in the sport. 2) “I Strip for God” part 9 – The Life in my Men (2022 page 124). Documents the relationships of Kellie Everts which were Mr. Universe, Mr. Americas: Mickey Hargitay, Vern Weaver, Harold Poole, Franco Columbu, Arnold Schwarzenegger, Dennis Tinerino, Boyer Coe, Chris Dickerson and Reg Lewis. 3) The Origin and Decline of Female Body Building (2009). Explains how the genre of female bodybuilding, at that time did not exist, how it got started, flourished, and began to decline after the year 2000, when men got frightened by Kim Chizevsky and changed the rules. Then when Weider sold out to AMI in 2003, it was relegated down to a subculture.

=== 1980–1989 ===
The 1980s is when female bodybuilding first took off. The early 1980s signified a transition from the fashionably thin "twiggy" body to one carrying slightly more muscle mass. The National Physique Committee (NPC) held the first women's Nationals in 1980. Since its inception, this has been the top amateur level competition for women in the US. Laura Combes won the inaugural contest. The first World Couples Championship was held in Atlantic City, New Jersey on April 8. The winning couple was Stacey Bentley and Chris Dickerson, with April Nicotra and Robby Robinson in second. Bentley picked up her third consecutive victory in the Frank Zane Invitational on June 28, ahead of Rachel McLish, Lynn Conkwright, Suzy Green, Patsy Chapman, and Georgia Miller Fudge.

In 1980, the first Ms. Olympia (initially known as the "Miss" Olympia), the most prestigious contest for professional female bodybuilders, was held. Initially, the contest was promoted by George Snyder. The contestants had to send in resumes and pictures and were hand-picked by Snyder based on their potential to be fitness role models for the average American woman. The first winner was Rachel McLish, who had also won the NPC's USA Championship earlier in the year. The contest was a major turning point for the sport of women's bodybuilding. McLish turned out to be very promotable and inspired many future competitors to start training and competing. Stacey Bentley finished in fifth place, in what turned out to be her final competition. Also in 1980, the American Federation of Women Bodybuilders was also founded, representing a growing awareness of women bodybuilders in America. Winning competitors such as Laurie Stark (Ms. Southern States, 1988) helped to popularize the federation.

Rachel McLish became the most successful competitor of the early 1980s. She lost her Ms. Olympia crown by finishing second to Kike Elomaa in 1981, but regained the title in 1982. A new major pro contest, the Women's Pro World Championship, was held for the first time in 1981 (won by Lynn Conkwright). Held annually through 1989, this was the second most prestigious contest of the time. McLish added this title to her collection in 1982. George Snyder lost the rights to the Ms. Olympia in 1982, and after this the contestants were no longer hand-picked, but instead qualified for the Ms. Olympia through placings in lesser contests. Women's bodybuilding was officially recognized as a sport discipline by the 1982 IFBB Congress in Bruges, Belgium.

As the sport grew, the competitors' level of training gradually increased as did the use of anabolic steroids (most of the competitors in the earliest shows had very little weight training experience or steroid usage), and the sport slowly evolved towards more muscular physiques. This trend started to emerge in 1983. With McLish not competing in the big shows, Carla Dunlap took both the Pro World and Ms. Olympia titles. Dunlap possessed a more muscular physique than either McLish or Elomaa, and though she never repeated her successes of 1983, she would remain competitive for the rest of the decade.

In 1984, a new force emerged in women's bodybuilding. Cory Everson won the NPC Nationals, then defeated McLish to win the Ms. Olympia. At 5'9" and 150 pounds, Everson's physique set a new standard. She would go on to win six consecutive Ms. Olympia titles from 1984 to 1989 before retiring undefeated as a professional, the only female bodybuilder ever to accomplish this.

During this period, women's bodybuilding was starting to achieve some serious mainstream exposure. Lori Bowen, winner of the 1984 Pro World Championship, appeared in a widely broadcast commercial for Miller Lite beer with Rodney Dangerfield. Additionally, competitors Lynn Conkwright (1982) and Carla Dunlap (1984) were included in ABC's Superstars competition.

In 1985, a movie called Pumping Iron II: The Women was released. This film documented the preparation of several women for the 1983 Caesars Palace World Cup Championship. Competitors prominently featured in the film were Kris Alexander, Lori Bowen, Lydia Cheng, Carla Dunlap, Bev Francis, and Rachel McLish. At the time, Francis was actually a powerlifter, though she soon made a successful transition to bodybuilding, becoming one of the leading competitors of the late 1980s and early 1990s. The main theme of the movie pitted the sultry and curvaceous Rachel McLish, the current champion, against the super-muscular Bev Francis. This "rivalry" brought to light the true dilemma of Women's Bodybuilding and exposed the root of all the controversy (aesthetics vs size) which was the focal point at that time, and which still continues today. In 1985, the National Women's and Mixed Pairs Bodybuilding Championships were held in Detroit, Michigan by promoter/bodybuilder Gema Wheeler (Long). It was the first amateur bodybuilding event televised internationally by ESPN Sports.

For several years in the mid-1980s, NBC broadcast coverage of the Ms. Olympia contest on their Sportsworld program. The taped footage was telecast months after the contest and was usually used as secondary material to fill out programs featuring events such as boxing. Typically, the broadcasts included only the top several women. Nevertheless, Rachel McLish and some of her leading competitors were receiving national TV coverage. McLish authored two New York Times best-selling books - "Flex Appeal" (1984) and "Perfect Parts" (1987) – and was also starring in action films. The popularity was growing, and women were being empowered and inspired to train. In 1983, the top prize money for the women bodybuilding was $50,000, equal to that of male bodybuilding.

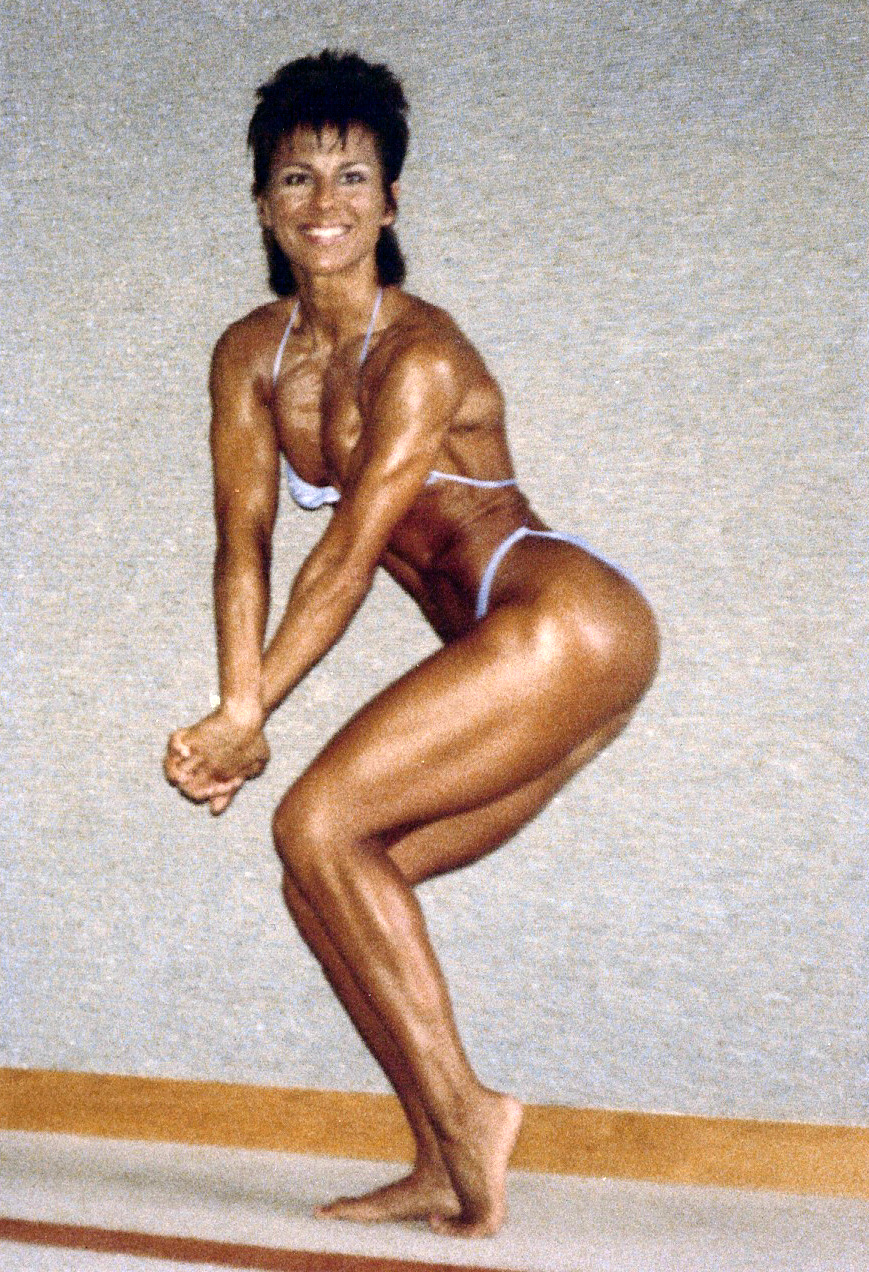
Kathy Segal posing on 14 June 1987.

The Ms. International contest was introduced in 1986, first won by Erika Geisen. In 1987, the Amateur Athletic Union (AAU), who were sanctioning amateur bodybuilding at the time, positioned the International as a premiere amateur event. It was held in Atlantic City, New Jersey. The AAU brought Serge Nubret (a former Mr. World, Mr. Universe and Mr. Europe) from France to be the featured guest poser. Since 1988, the competition has been sanctioned by the IFBB. Since the demise of the Pro World Championship after 1989, the Ms. International has been second in prestige only to the Ms. Olympia. The 1989 Ms. International was noteworthy for the fact that the original winner, Tonya Knight, was later disqualified for using a surrogate for her drug test at the 1988 Ms. Olympia contest. Consequently, runner-up Jackie Paisley received the 1989 title. Knight was suspended from IFBB competition through the end of 1990 and was forced to return her prize money from the 1988 Ms. Olympia and 1989 Ms. International, a total of $12,000 (Merritt, 2006).

=== 1990–1999 ===
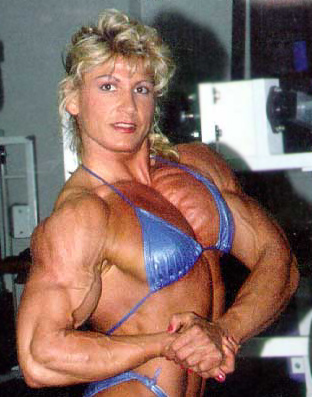
Nikki Fuller doing a side chest pose

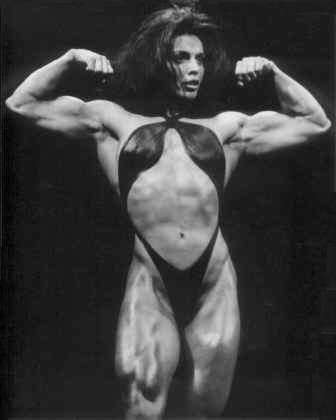
Sharon Bruneau doing a front double biceps at a bodybuilding contest.

Normally, competitors must qualify for the Ms. Olympia by achieving certain placings in lesser pro contests. However, the cancellation of the Women's Pro World contest in 1990 left only the Ms. International as a Ms. Olympia qualifier. Consequently, the IFBB decided to open the Ms. Olympia to all women with pro cards, and a field of thirty competitors entered. Lenda Murray, a new pro from Michigan, earned a decisive victory and emerged as the successor to Cory Everson. Murray became the next dominant figure in the sport.

A new professional contest, the Jan Tana Classic, was introduced in 1991. The contest was named for its promoter, a marketer of tanning products, and ran annually until 2003 with the departure of Wayne Demilia (it was later briefly revived in 2007). The inaugural event was won by Sue Gafner. The Jan Tana filled the void left by the Women's Pro World contest and occupied the number three slot on the pro circuit throughout its lifetime. 1991 also saw Tonya Knight return to competition, winning the Ms. International.

The 1991 Ms. Olympia contest was the first to be televised live. Lenda Murray faced a serious challenge from the 1990 runner-up, Bev Francis. Francis had started bodybuilding in the mid-1980s, converting over from powerlifting. Over the years, she had gradually refined her physique to be more in line with judging standards. However, she came to the 1991 contest noticeably larger than in previous years. Francis was leading going into the night show, with Murray needing all of the first-place votes to retain her title. Murray managed to do just that, winning a somewhat controversial decision by one point.

In 1992, there was more controversy, this time at the 1992 Ms. International contest. In response to the increased size displayed by Murray and Francis at the previous Ms. Olympia, along with increasing drug abuse and androgenic side effects, the IFBB made an attempt to "feminize" the sport. The IFBB, led by Ben Weider, had created a series of "femininity" rules; one line in the judging rules said that competitors should not be "too big." Since extreme size generally requires extreme AAS usage, with more women gaining more androgenic (masculine) side effects, this was clearly an attempt to retain a higher level of female aesthetics and maintain the standard. The judges' guide to the competitors stated that they were looking for a highly feminine and optimally developed, but not emaciated physique. The contest winner was Germany's Anja Schreiner, a blue-eyed blonde with a symmetrical physique who weighed 130 lb (59 kg) at 5 ft 7 in (170 cm). The announcement of her victory met with so much booing from those who prefer size over aesthetics that Arnold Schwarzenegger had to step on stage to address the audience, saying "the hell with the judges". Many observers felt that the IFBB had instructed the judges to select the most marketable aesthetic physique, not the most muscular.

The 1992 Ms. International is also famous for an incident involving British competitor Paula Bircumshaw. Bircumshaw was the same height as Schreiner and possessed a similar level of symmetry and definition, but carried significantly more muscle, weighing in at 162 lb (73 kg). She was the clear audience favorite, but was relegated to eighth place. Normally, the top ten contestants are called out at the end of the show when the winners are announced, but the judges only called back the top six, hoping to keep Bircumshaw backstage. This resulted in an uproar from the crowd. With the audience chanting her name, Bircumshaw returned to the stage along with the top six competitors.

Advertising in Muscle & Fitness for the 1992 Ms. Olympia featured Schreiner prominently, relegating two-time defending champion Murray to a small "also competing" notice. Nevertheless, Murray also apparently met the "femininity" requirements, and managed to retain her title; Schreiner finished sixth, and promptly retired from competition.

Following the 1992 debacles, the judging rules were rewritten. The new rules retained provisions for aesthetics, but allowed the contests to be judged as physique contests. Lenda Murray continued to dominate the sport from 1990 to 1995, matching Cory Everson's record of six consecutive Ms. Olympia titles. Murray's closest rival was probably Laura Creavalle, who won the Ms. International title three times, and twice was runner-up to Murray at the Olympia. During this time, some additional professional shows were held, in addition to the three mainstays. The 1994 schedule included the Canada Pro Cup, won by Laura Binetti, and the first of three annual Grand Prix events in Prague, won by Drorit Kernes. In 1996, the Grand Prix in Slovakia was added. Besides providing the competitors with extra opportunities to win prize money, these contests also served as additional Ms. Olympia qualifiers.

The mid-1990s of bodybuilding was known as the "Dorian Era", also known as the "drug years". In 1996, Kim Chizevsky-Nicholls would win the Ms. International and dethroned the Ms. International champion, Laura Creavalle. Also in 1996, she would unseat six-time defending champion, Lenda Murray. This was the first time that a pro female bodybuilder would win both the Ms. International and Ms. Olympia in the same year. She would retain her Ms. Olympia title in 1997 against Lenda Murray, who retired afterwards. At the 1997 Ms. Olympia, she competed at 157 lb (71 kg). In 1998, she again won the Ms. Olympia title. The 1998 contest was held in Prague, Czech Republic, the first time the competition had been held outside the United States.

After the deaths of Mohammed Benaziza, whose autopsy blamed the abuse of diuretics, and Andreas Münzer, who his doctors blamed his death on years of abusing steroids, growth hormones and diuretics, from 1998 to 2001, International Federation of BodyBuilding and Fitness (IFBB) Pro Division contests, such as the Ms. International and Ms. Olympia, tested for diuretics only. The reason for this was twofold: diuretics are more deadly than steroids, performance-enhancing substances and growth hormones, along with the IFBB being granted provisional recognition by the International Olympic Committee from 1998 to 2001. Those who tested positive for diuretics would be disqualified from the contest they attended and have to hand over whatever prize money they earned. At the 1998 Ms. International, Lesa Lewis, Gayle Moher and Denise Masino were disqualified after their diuretic tests found that they tested positive. At the 2000 Ms. International, Iris Kyle and Tazzie Colomb were both disqualified after positive diuretic tests. By the 2002 Ms. Olympia, the diuretic test was quietly dropped.

At the 1998 EFBB British Championships, Joanna Thomas won the lightweight and overall title, becoming the youngest woman in the world to ever to win an IFBB pro card at the age of 21.

The 1999 Ms. Olympia was originally scheduled to be held on October 9 in Santa Monica, California. However, one month before the scheduled date, the IFBB announced that the contest had been cancelled. The main cause was the withdrawal of promoter Jarka Kastnerova (who promoted the 1998 contest in Prague) for financial reasons, including a low number of advance ticket sales for the 1999 event. The backlash following the announcement led to a flurry of activity, with the contest being rescheduled as part of the Women's Extravaganza (promoted by Kenny Kassel and Bob Bonham) in Secaucus, New Jersey on October 2. Last minute sponsorship came from several sources, most significantly in the form of $50,000 from Flex magazine. Amid all the turmoil, Kim Chizevsky-Nicholls won her fourth consecutive title. Chizevsky-Nicholls decided to retire from bodybuilding after winning the 1999 Ms. Olympia. According to Bill Dobbins, she retired due to gender discrimination guidelines set up by the IFBB that advocated for more "femininity" and less "muscularity" in the sport.

=== 2000–2009 ===
In 2000, the International Federation of BodyBuilding and Fitness (IFBB) introduced three major changes to the professional female bodybuilding division. The first change was the introduction of weight classes (lightweight and heavyweight). The second was the Ms. Olympia would no longer be held a separate contest, instead becoming part of the Joe Weider's Olympia Fitness & Performance Weekend and held the day before the Mr. Olympia. The third change was the new judging guidelines for presentations were introduced. A letter to the competitors from Jim Manion (chairman of the Professional Judges Committee) stated that women would be judged on healthy appearance, face, makeup, and skin tone. The criteria given in Manion's letter included the statement "symmetry, presentation, separations, and muscularity BUT NOT TO THE EXTREME!"

At the 2000 Ms. International, Ondrea "Vickie" Gates won the heavyweight and overall Ms. International title, while Brenda Raganot won the lightweight Ms. International title. This was Vickie's 2nd overall and consecutive Ms. International title. Of the three IFBB professional contests held in 2000, only the Ms. International had an overall title. It was later announced afterwards that Iris Kyle, who placed 3rd in the heavyweight category, and Tazzie Colomb, who placed 5th in the heavyweight category, were disqualified for diuretic use. At the 2000 Ms. Olympia, with Kim Chizevsky-Nicholls retired, Valentina Chepiga won the heavyweight Ms. Olympia title, while Andrulla Blanchette won the lightweight Ms. Olympia title.

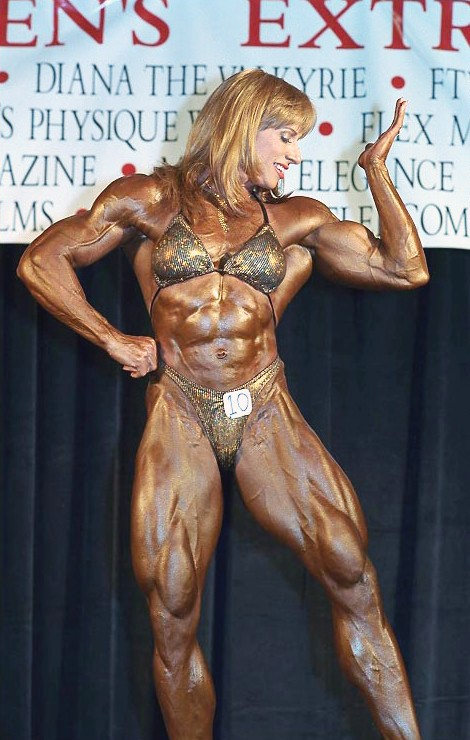
Betty Pariso posing at the 2001 Extravaganza Strength Contest

At the 2001 Ms. International, Vickie won the heavyweight and overall Ms. International title, while Dayana Cadeau won the lightweight Ms. International title. This was Vickie's 3rd overall and consecutive Ms. International title. At the 2001 Ms. Olympia, both Valentina and Andrulla were dethroned of their titles. Juliette Bergmann, who returned to professional bodybuilding after a 12-year absence and had been an IFBB professional judge for the last 10 years, won the lightweight and overall Ms. Olympia title, while Iris won the heavyweight Ms. Olympia title.

At the 2002 Ms. International, Yaxeni Oriquen won the heavyweight and overall Ms. International title, while Valentina won the lightweight Ms. International title. At the 2002 Ms. Olympia, both Juliette and Iris were dethroned of their title by Lenda Murray. Lenda, who returned to professional bodybuilding after a 5-year absence, won the heavyweight and overall Ms. Olympia title, while Juliette won the lightweight Ms. Olympia title.

At the 2002 International Federation of BodyBuilding and Fitness (IFBB) General Nutrition Centers (GNC) Show of Strength Pro Women's Bodybuilding contest, which was held as part of the 2002 GNC Show of Strength & World Expo, Yaxeni won the heavyweight and overall titles, which qualified her for the 2003 IFBB Ms. Olympia, while Valentina won the lightweight title. According to Bill Dobbins, it "was planned to be a new version of the Arnold Weekend". It was invitational only like the IFBB Ms. International. Some of the most seasoned professional female bodybuilders, such as Valentina Chepiga, Iris Kyle, Vickie Gates (who did not finish the contest due to an injury), Yaxeni Oriquen, Gayle Moher, Fannie Barrios, Beth Roberts, etc., attended. The contest had a low audience attendance due to it being held 3 weeks after the 2003 IFBB Ms. Olympia and 2 weeks before the NPC Nationals Women's Bodybuilding, along with limited advertising. Cathy LeFrancois Priest, who placed 2nd in the lightweight category, also qualified for the 2003 IFBB Ms. Olympia. This was the last contest Iris Kyle attended that was not the IFBB Ms. Olympia or IFBB Ms. International.

At the 2003 Ms. International, Yaxeni won the heavyweight and overall Ms. International title, while Valentina was dethroned by Cathy Priest, who won the lightweight Ms. International title. This was Yaxeni's 2nd overall and consecutive Ms. International title. At the 2003 Ms. Olympia, Lenda won the heavyweight and overall Ms. Olympia title, while Juliette won the lightweight Ms. Olympia title. There was massive booing during the award ceremony of the third place and runner-up spots of the heavyweight and lightweight divisions due to the placings.

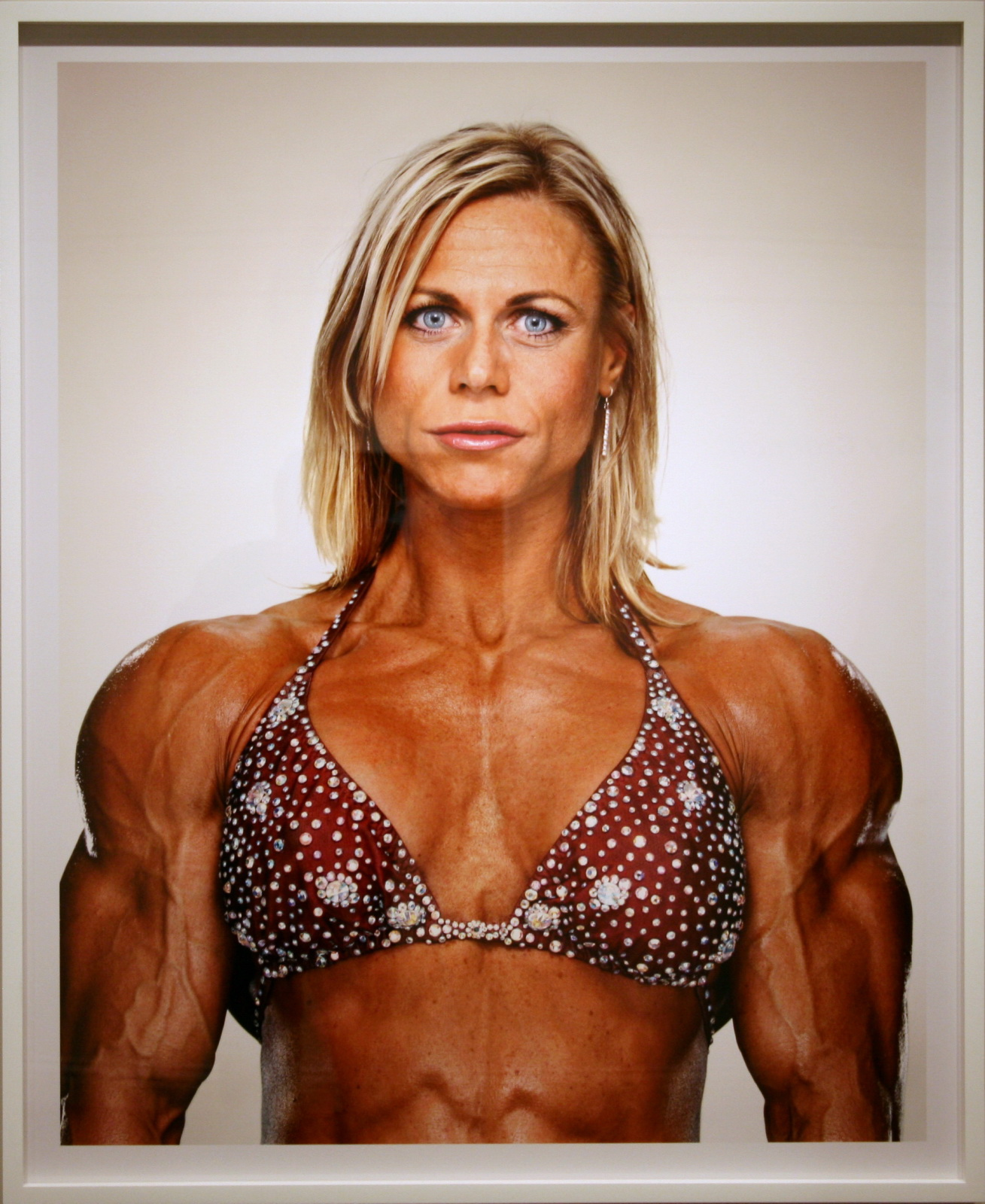
Portrait of Christine Roth at the 2004 IFBB Ms. International.

On 8 October 2004, the 2004 IFBB GNC Show of Strength Pro Women's Bodybuilding contest was held as part of the 2004 GNC Show of Strength & World Expo. Unlike in 2002, in 2004 it was the last IFBB professional qualifier for the 2004 IFBB Ms. Olympia. It was moved from the Ernest N. Morial New Orleans Convention Center to the Cobb Galleria Centre. It was featured in the 2005 documentary Supersize She. Helle Nielsen and Heather Foster both had to withdraw from the contest due to injuries. Yaxeni Oriquen won the heavyweight and overall titles, while Nancy Lewis won the lightweight title, which qualified her for the 2004 IFBB Ms. Olympia. Lisa Aukland, who placed 3rd in the heavyweight category, and Joanna Thomas, who placed 2nd in the lightweight category, also qualified for the 2004 IFBB Ms. Olympia. This was the last IFBB GNC Show of Strength Pro held.

Murray was unseated as Ms. Olympia for the second time in 2004. Iris Kyle, a top pro competitor since 1999, defeated Murray in a close battle in the heavyweight class, and bested lightweight winner Dayana Cadeau for the overall title. Kyle became only the second woman to win both the Ms. International and Ms. Olympia titles in the same year, matching Kim Chizevsky-Nicholls's feat of 1996.

On 6 December 2004, IFBB Professional Division Vice Chairman Jim Manion issued a memo introducing the so-called '20 percent rule' to all IFBB professional female athletes. It read, "For aesthetics and health reasons, the IFBB Professional Division requests that female athletes in Bodybuilding, Fitness and Figure decrease the amount of muscularity by a factor of 20%. This request for a 20% decrease in the amount of muscularity applies to those female athletes whose physiques require the decrease regardless of whether they compete in Bodybuilding, Fitness or Figure. All professional judges have been advised of the proper criteria for assessing female physiques." Needless to say the directive created quite a stir, and left many women wondering if they were one of "those female athletes whose physiques require the decrease". On April 20, 2005, the IFBB adopted, by a 9 for, 1 against, and 3 no votes for Resolution 2005–0001, which announced that starting with the 2005 Ms. Olympia that the IFBB was abolishing the weight class system adopted in 2000.

The 2005 contest season saw another double winner, as Yaxeni Oriquen-Garcia won her third Ms. International title, then edged out defending champion Iris Kyle to win the Ms. Olympia. Also notable in 2005 was the return of Jitka Harazimova, who had last competed in 1999. Harazimova won the Charlotte Pro contest in her return to competition, qualifying her for the Ms. Olympia where she finished fourth. Also, in 2005, the documentary Supersize She was released. The documentary focused on focused on British professional female bodybuilder Joanna Thomas and her competing at the 2004 GNC Show of Strength and the 2004 Ms. Olympia.

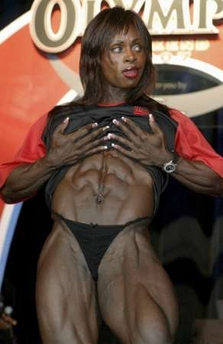
Dayana Cadeau posing at the 2007 Olympia Press Conference.

In 2006, Iris Kyle won both the Ms. International and the Ms. Olympia, repeating her accomplishment of 2004. Iris won the Ms. International and Ms. Olympia for a third time in 2007. Also, 2007 saw the brief revival of the Jan Tana Classic, which featured two weight classes for the female competitors. The class titles were won by Stephanie Kessler (heavyweight) and Sarah Dunlap (lightweight), with Dunlap named the overall winner.

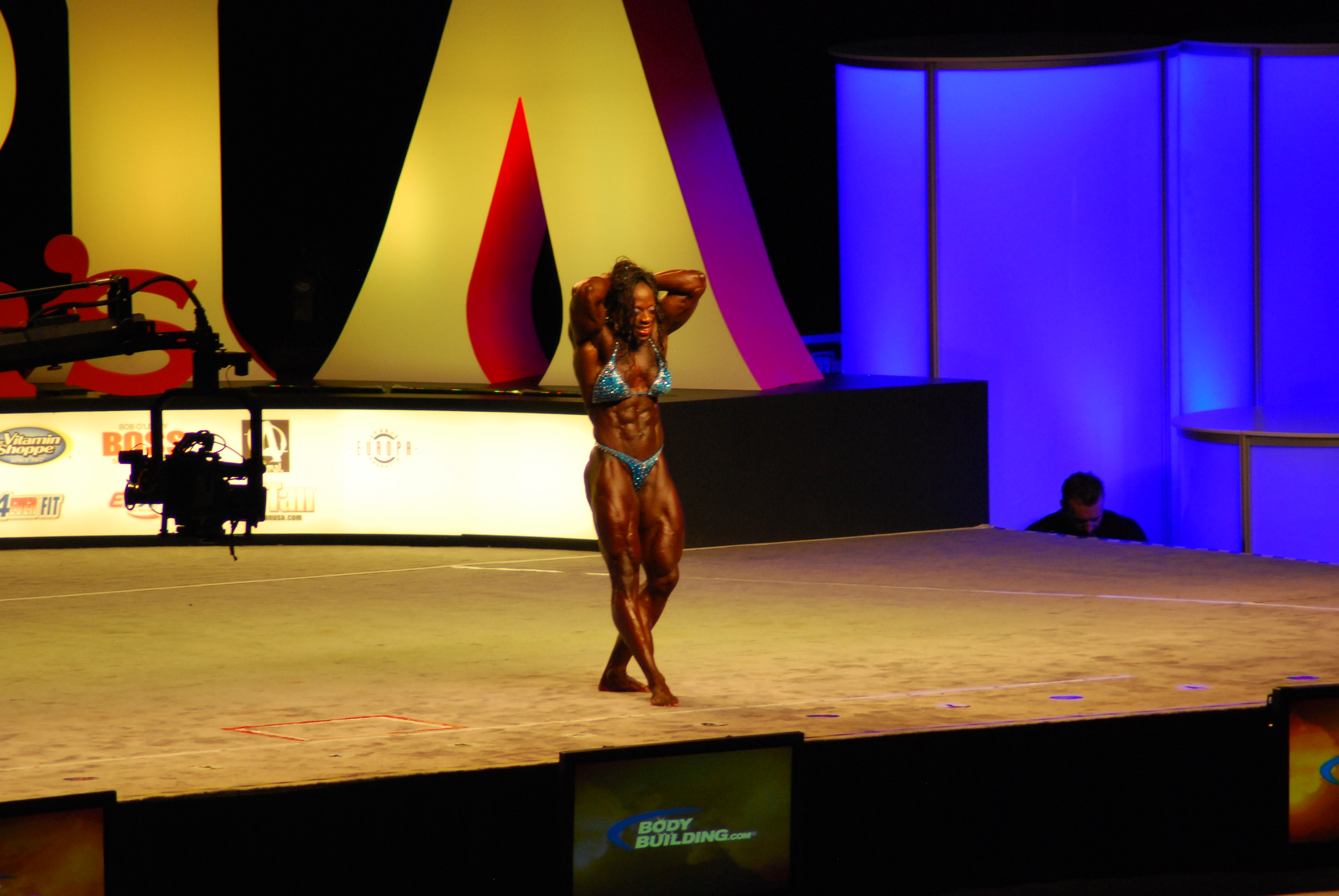
Iris Kyle doing an abdominals and thighs pose on September 26, 2008, during the 2008 Ms. Olympia finals

In 2008, the book Female Bodybuilders by Martin Schoeller was published. The book featured a monograph of close up portraits of 63 professional female bodybuilders that was taken at various bodybuilding contests from the 2003 Ms. Olympia to 2008 IFBB New York Pro.

There was controversy at the 2008 Ms. International due to placing Iris Kyle in a tie with Betty Viana-Adkins for 7th place. This was Iris' worst placing since her professional debut at the 1999 Ms. International where she placed 15th place. This put Iris outside the top 6 posedown and any prize money. According to the scorecard, in rounds 1 & 2 she obtained 44 points, which would place her above Betty Pariso for 4th place, but by round 3 she garnered 65 points for a combined total of 109 points. Only herself and Dayana Cadeau increased their points in round 3 compared to rounds 1 & 2. After the 2008 Ms. International, in an interview on an episode of the Pro Bodybuilding Weekly Radio talk program, when asked about why there was bumps on Iris' shoulders and glutes, which she later admitted where "noticeable site injections", she said that "when you in the sport and you decide to take it to the league level you know those things take place". She also stated that the bumps won't even have been an issue if she had been a male and thought she should have been placed 1st. Later in that same episode, according to head IFBB judge, Sandy Ranalli, she stated that Iris was placed 7th due to "distortions" in her shoulders and glutes that the other competitors didn't have. However, she had previously had bumps on her glutes in previous Ms. International's and Ms. Olympia's and either outright won them or placed higher than 7th place. Yaxeni Oriquen-Garcia went on to win the 2008 Ms. International. Iris rebounded at the 2008 Ms. Olympia by winning the show. She went on to win both 2009 Ms. International and 2009 Ms. Olympia titles in the same year.

=== 2010–2019 ===
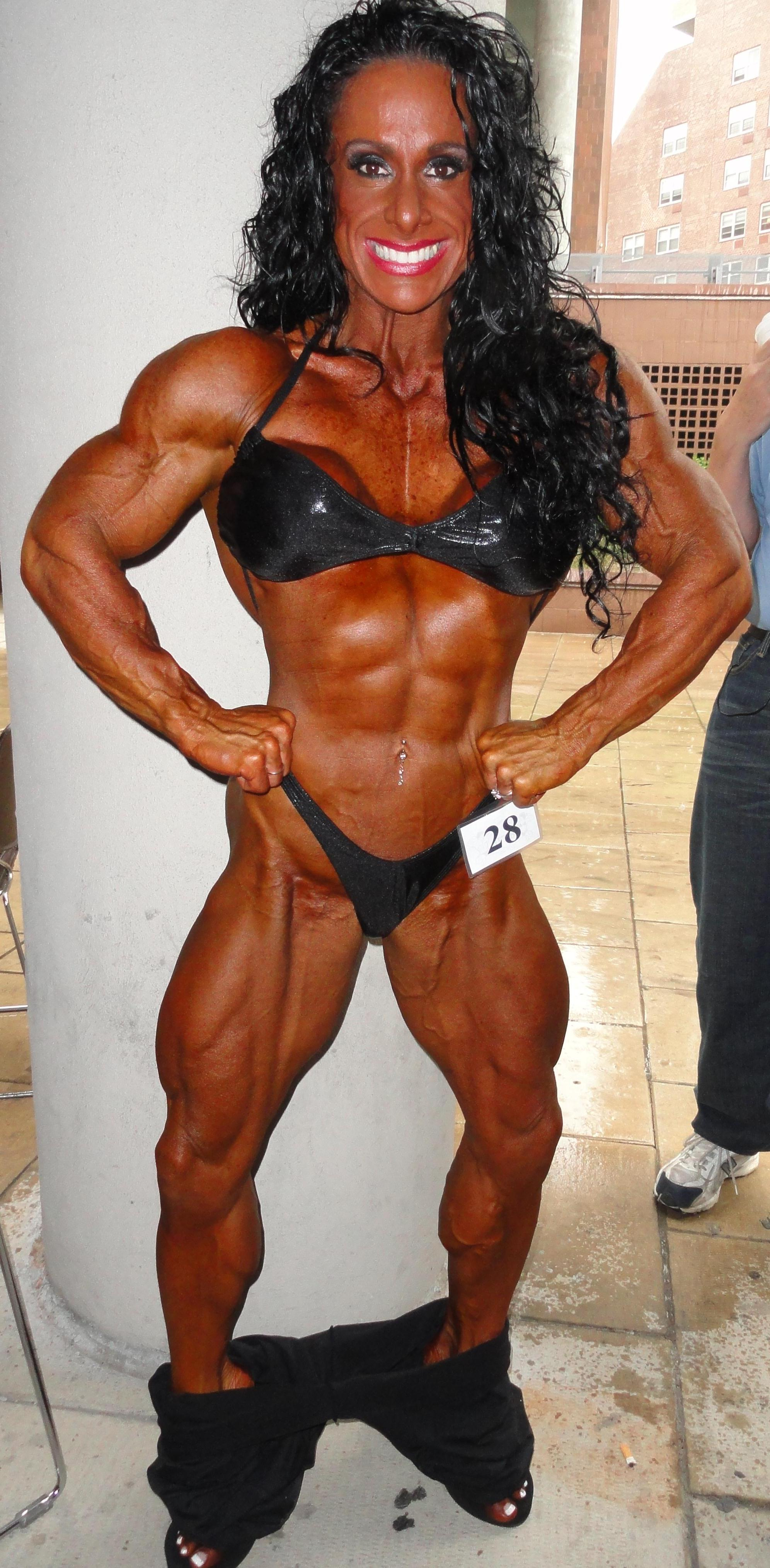
Debbie Bramwell doing a front lat spread pose before the 2010 IFBB New York Pro on 8 May 2010.

Iris Kyle continued her success by winning both the Ms. International and the Ms. Olympia in the same year in 2010 and 2011. In 2012, Iris suffered an injury to her leg and thus could not attend the 2012 Ms. International, which allowed Yaxeni Oriquen-Garcia to win the 2012 Ms. International. Iris went on to win the 2012 Ms. Olympia. She won her eight overall Olympia title. Along with her two heavyweight titles, she surpassed the records of both Lee Haney's and Ronnie Coleman's eight overall Olympia titles, along with tying her record with Lenda Murray's eight overall and two heavyweight Olympia titles. She also won her seventh consecutive Olympia win and surpassed the records of both Corinna Everson's and Lenda Murray's six consecutive Olympia wins.

Edith Connor was declared the oldest competitive female bodybuilder by the Guinness Book of World Records in 2012, when she was 77, breaking the record of Ernestine Shepherd.

At the 2013 Ms. International, Iris Kyle would reclaim her title. This was her seventh overall Ms. International title. On 7 June 2013, event promoter of the Arnold Sports Festival, Jim Lorimer, announced that in 2014, the Arnold Classic 212 professional men's bodybuilding division would replace the Ms. International women's bodybuilding competition at the 2014 Arnold Sports Festival. Lorimer, in a statement, said "The Arnold Sports Festival was proud to support women's bodybuilding through the Ms. International for the past quarter century, but in keeping with demands of our fans, the time has come to introduce the Arnold Classic 212 beginning in 2014. We are excited to create a professional competitive platform for some of the IFBB Pro League's most popular competitors."

At the 2013 Ms. Olympia, Iris Kyle won her ninth overall Olympia win, thus giving her more overall Olympia titles than any other bodybuilder, male or female. She also won her eight consecutive Olympia win and tied her record with the records of both Lee Haney's and Ronnie Coleman's eight consecutive Olympia wins. At the 2014 Ms. Olympia, she won her tenth overall Olympia win, beating her own previous record of nine overall Olympia wins. She also won her ninth consecutive Olympia title in a row, beating the records of both Lee Haney's and Ronnie Coleman's record eight consecutive Olympia titles, thus giving her more overall and consecutive Olympia wins than any other bodybuilder, male or female, of all time. After winning, she announced that she would be retiring from bodybuilding. Later it was announced that there would be no Ms. Olympia held at the 2015 Joe Weider's Olympia Fitness & Performance Weekend.

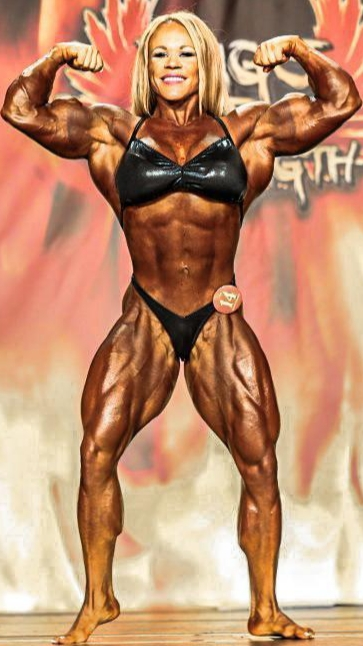
Aleesha Young doing a front double bicep pose at the 2015 Rising Phoenix World Championships on 22 August 2015

On 8 March 2015, Wings of Strength announced the creation of the Wings of Strength Rising Phoenix World Championships. Regarded as the successor to the Ms. Olympia, Wings of Strength Rising Phoenix World Championships adopted the point qualification system that the Ms. Olympia had. With Iris Kyle retired and Alina Popa, regarded as Iris' natural successor and came in runner-up in the 2013 and 2014 Ms. Olympia's, not competing in 2015 due to injuries, it was up in the air who would win the 2015 Rising Phoenix World Championships. At the 2015 Rising Phoenix World Championships, Margaret "Margie" Martin, who was a dark horse contestant who placed 10th at the 2014 Ms. Olympia, won the first Ms. Rising Phoenix title and best poser award. She beat much more seasoned professionals, such as Helle Trevino, Debi Laszewski and Yaxeni Oriquen-Garcia.

At the 2016 Rising Phoenix World Championships, Margie won her 2nd Ms. Rising Phoenix title. She would not attend the 2017 Rising Phoenix World Championships, which was won by Helle Trevino. At the 2018 Rising Phoenix World Championships, Alina Popa dethroned Helle Trevino, along with beating Margie Martin and win her first Ms. Rising Phoenix title. Afterwards, Alina retired from bodybuilding. At the 2019 Rising Phoenix World Championships, Helle beat Margie to win her 2nd Ms. Rising Phoenix World Championships.

=== 2020–present ===
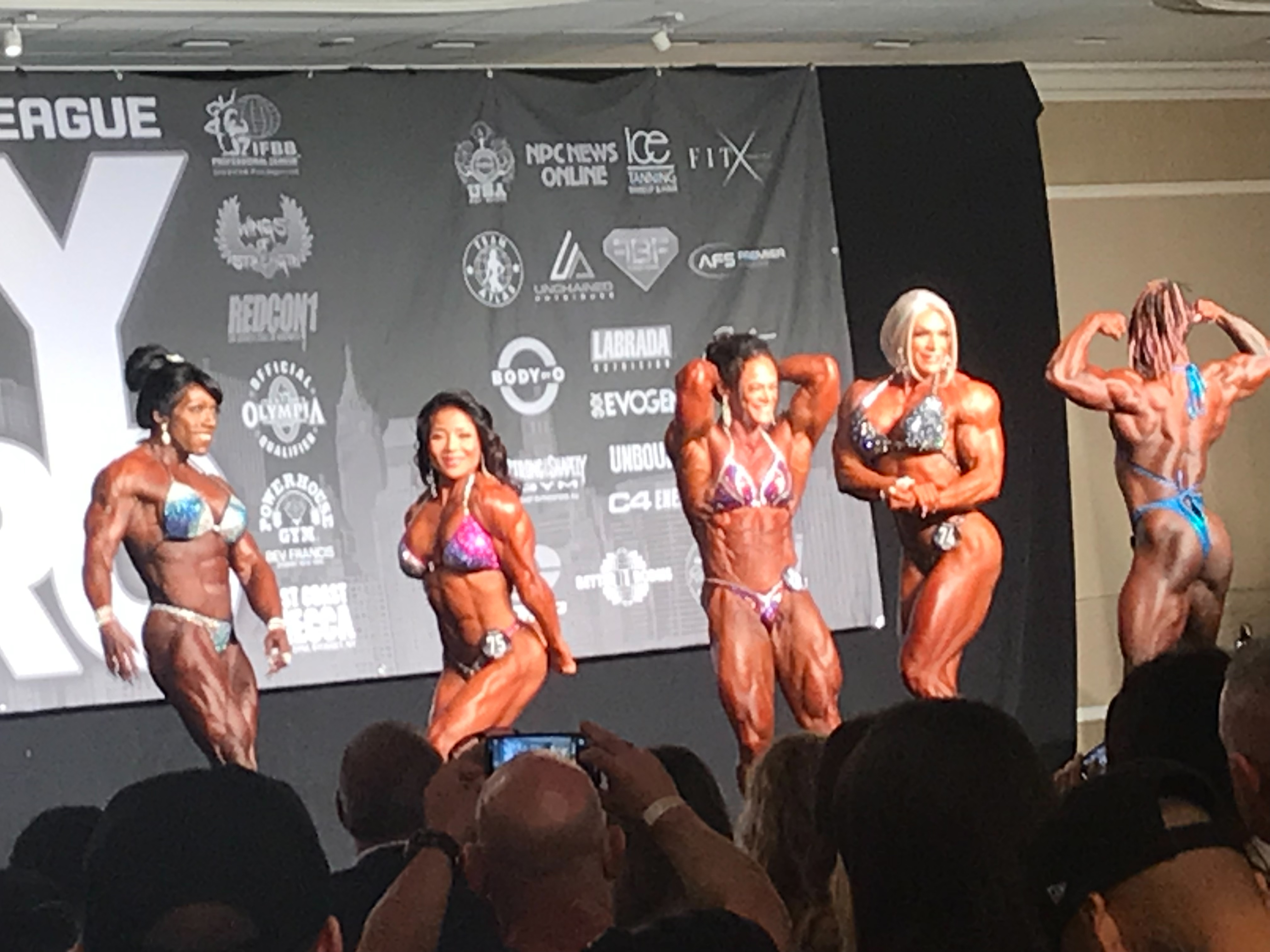
On 21 May 2022, the 2022 IFBB New York Pro Women's Bodybuilding finals posedown, featuring in order the following: Keisha Oliver, Mchelle Jin, Donna Salib, Stephanie Flesher and Saqweta Barrino, was held in Teaneck Marriott at Glenpointe, Teaneck, New Jersey, United States of America.

In 2020, Andrea Shaw, a dark horse contestant who placed 7th at the 2019 Rising Phoenix World Championships, went on to dethrone the current Ms. Rising Phoenix Helle Trevino at the 2020 Rising Phoenix World Championships and win her 1st Ms. Rising Phoenix title. She continued her victory streak and won the 2020 Ms. Olympia. Also in 2020, the American bodybuilder Jen Pasky Jaquin received the first IFBB pro card for female wheelchair bodybuilding. Andrea would continue her success by winning both the Rising Phoenix World Championships and the Ms. Olympia in the same year in 2021 and 2022.

== IFBB Hall of Fame ==
The IFBB established a Hall of Fame in 1999. The following women have been inducted:

- 1999 – Carla Dunlap, Cory Everson, and Rachel McLish
- 2000 – Bev Francis, Lisa Lyon, and Abbye Stockton
- 2001 – Kay Baxter, Diana Dennis, and Kike Elomaa
- 2002 – Laura Combes
- 2003 – Lynn Conkwright
- 2004 – Ellen van Maris
- 2005 – Stacey Bentley
- 2006 – Claudia Wilbourn
- 2007 – Laura Creavalle
- 2008 – Kim Chizevsky-Nicholls
- 2009 – Juliette Bergmann
- 2010 – Lenda Murray and Vickie Gates
- 2011 – Tonya Knight and Anja Langer

== Competitions ==
=== Professional competitions ===
==== 2024 IFBB Pro League Schedule ====
Last update: 27 February 2024

Competition	Date	Place	Promoter
2024 Triple O Dynasty Pro Open + Masters 40	6 April 2024	Mesa, Arizona	Cydney Gillon, Andrea Shaw, Whitney Jones
2024 Vancouver Island Showdown Pro	20 April 2024	Victoria, Canada	Corey Swiergosz
2024 New York Pro	18 May 2024	Teaneck, New Jersey	Steve Weinberger
2024 Toronto Pro Supeprshow; Open + Masters 35	9 June 2024	Toronto, Canada	Ron Hache
2024 Empro Classic Spain Pro	16 June 2024	Alicante, Spain	Emilio Martinez
2024 Mr. Big Evolution Pro	7 July 2024	Estoril, Portugal	Joao Henriques, Mr. Big Evolution
2024 Lenda Murray Atlanta Pro; Open + Masters 40	13–14 July 2024	Duluth, (Georgia (U.S. state)) Georgia	Alex Sacasa, Wings of Strength
2024 Chicago Pro; Open + Masters 40/50/55/60	18–20 July 2024	Chicago, Illinois	Tim Gardner
2024 Titan Tampa Pro; Open + Masters 40/50/55/60	1–3 August 2024	Tampa, Florida	Tim Gardner
2024 Pro Masters World Championships; Masters 40/50/60/70	1 September 2024	Pittsburgh, Pennsylvania	Gary Udit
2024 Alina Popa Classic Pro	1 September 2024	Cluj-Napoca, Romania	Wings of Strength
2024 Rising Phoenix; Invitational	14 September 2024	Phoenix, Arizona	Alex Sacasa
2024 Titans Grand Prix Pro	21 September 2024	Anaheim, California	Tamer El Guindy
2024 Ms. Olympia	11 October 2024	Las Vegas, Nevada	Dan Solomon
2024 Romania Muscle Fest Pro	19–10 November 2024	Bucharest, Romania	Wings of Strength

==== Qualifications for IFBB professional card ====
In order to become an "IFBB Pro", one must first earn an IFBB Pro Card. In order to win, a bodybuilder looking to do this must first win a regional contest weight class. When a bodybuilder wins or places highly, they earn an invite to compete at their country's National Championships contest for that year. The winners of each weight class at the National Championships will then go head-to-head in a separate contest to see who is the overall Champion for the year. Depending on the federation, the overall Champion will be offered a pro card. Some federations offer Pro Cards to winners of individual weight class champions. This can mean that each year, more than one bodybuilder may earn a Pro Card.

In the United States, the NPC (National Physique Committee) is affiliated with the IFBB and awards IFBB Pro Cards. The following competitions award IFBB Pro Cards:

- NPC Women's National Championships has three weight classes: Lightweight, middleweight, and heavyweight. All three class winners in the contest are eligible for professional status.
- NPC USA Championships has three weight classes. The overall winner is eligible for professional status.
- IFBB World Championships, each weight class winner is eligible for pro status.
- IFBB North American Championships, the overall winners is eligible for professional status.

=== Amateur competitions ===
==== 2022 Pro Card Winners ====
Competition	Place	Date	Name	Country
Caribbean (Bermuda) Pro Qualifier	Hamilton, Bermuda	March 31, 2022	Luciana Dasilveira	Bermuda
NPC Teen Collegiate & Masters National Championships	Pittsburgh, Pennsylvania, United States	July 20, 2022	Rebecca Woody	United States
NPC Teen Collegiate & Masters National Championships	Pittsburgh, Pennsylvania, United States	July 20, 2022	Linda Perry	United States
NPC Teen Collegiate & Masters National Championships	Pittsburgh, Pennsylvania, United States	July 20, 2022	Eunice Martinez-Kitchen	United States
NPC Teen Collegiate & Masters National Championships	Pittsburgh, Pennsylvania, United States	July 20, 2022	Lori Conley	United States
NPC Teen Collegiate & Masters National Championships	Pittsburgh, Pennsylvania, United States	July 20, 2022	Erin Hawkins	United States
NPC Teen Collegiate & Masters National Championships	Pittsburgh, Pennsylvania, United States	July 20, 2022	Lena Betka	United States
NPC Teen Collegiate & Masters National Championships	Pittsburgh, Pennsylvania, United States	July 20, 2022	Marika Jones	United States
NPC USA Championships	Las Vegas, Nevada, United States	July 29, 2022	Gessica Campbell	United States
Olympia Amateur Eastern Europe	Bucharest, Romania	August 22, 2022	Soos Alexandra	Hungary
NPC North American Championships Pro Qualifier	Pittsburgh, Pennsylvania, United States	August 31, 2022	Ava Melillo	United States
NPC North American Championships Pro Qualifier	Pittsburgh, Pennsylvania, United States	August 31, 2022	Lea Geiger	United States
NPC North American Championships Pro Qualifier	Pittsburgh, Pennsylvania, United States	August 31, 2022	Lea Geiger	United States
NPC North American Championships Pro Qualifier	Pittsburgh, Pennsylvania, United States	August 31, 2022	Sarah Boes	Canada
Romania Muscle Fest Pro Qualifier	Bucharest, Romania	November 12, 2022	Emilia Balkova	Bulgaria

==== National Physique Committee (NPC) competitions ====
===== Qualifications for national level competitions =====
In order to qualify for national level competitions a competitor must place in one of the following:

- Rank in the top three in their weight class of the Women's open division in a contest that has been sanctioned as a national qualifier.
- First overall in an area championship of the open division.
- Top two in a weight class from an area level national qualifier
- Overall winner in a district level competition designated as a national qualifier.
- Winner of the weight class in a regional competition designated as a national qualifier.
- Weight class winners from the Armed Forces.

Qualifications for Junior USA, Teen and Masters Nationals

To qualify for Junior USA, Teen or Masters Nationals a competitor must place in one of the following:

- Top five in a weight class from a national level competition
- Top three in a weight class in the Teen or Masters Nationals
- Class winner in the Armed Forces
- Top three in a weight class from an Area national qualifier
- Top two from a district level national qualifier

Qualifications for USA and Junior Nationals

In order to qualify for USA and Junior Nationals a competitor must place in one of the following:

- Top five in a weight class from the Nationals, USA, Team Universe or Junior Nationals
- Top three in a weight class from the Teen, Collegiate Masters Nationals
- Class winner in the Armed Forces
- First overall in an area level national qualifier
- Top two in an area level national qualifier
- Weight class winner from a district level competition designated as a national qualifier

Qualifications for Nationals and North American Championships

In order to qualify for Nationals or North American Championships a competitor must place in one of the following:

- Top five in a weight class from the Nationals, NPC USA or North American Championships
- Top five in a weight class from the Team Universe, Junior Nationals or Junior USA
- Top five in a weight class from Teen Collegiate Masters Nationals
- Top two in a weight class in the Armed Forces
- Top two in a weight class in an area level national qualifier
- Overall winner in a district level competition designated as a national qualifier
- Class winners at the US and Nationals will be given five years of eligibility.

==== National Amateur Body-Builders' Association (NABBA) competitions ====
- NABBA European Championships
- NABBA Universe

== Fitness and figure competition ==
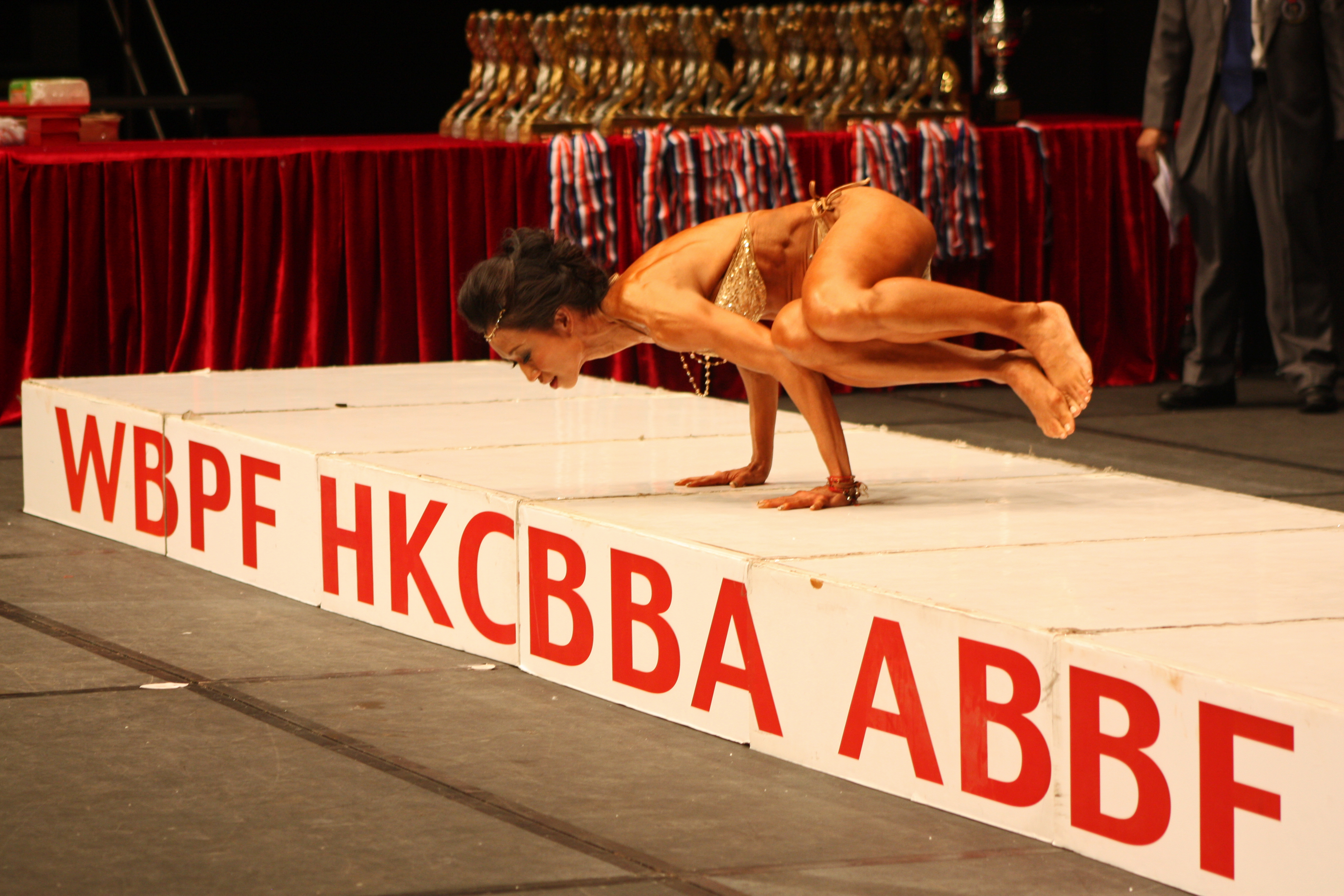
A female competitor during a bodybuilding show in Asia

There are two other categories of competition that are closely related to bodybuilding and are frequently held as part of the same event. Fitness competition has a swimsuit round, and a round that is judged on the performance of a routine including aerobics, dance, or gymnastics. Figure competition is a newer format, which combines female bodybuilding and gymnastics altogether, is judged solely on symmetry and muscle tone, with much less emphasis on muscle size than in bodybuilding.

In a competition, each woman poses in a bikini. She must strike different poses, while facing forward, to the side, and to the rear. During her poses, she must emphasize her arms, shoulders, chest, stomach, buttocks, and legs by flexing them. The judges carefully observe, evaluate, then numerically grade the firmness and shapeliness of the woman's physique.

In the figure division the same judging criteria is applied, but without a fitness routine.

== Disparities and discrimination ==
Year	Mr. Olympia prize money	Ms. Olympia prize money	Ms. Olympia prize money disparity
1980	$25,000	$10,000	-$15,000
1981	$25,000	$25,000	$0
1986	$55,000	$50,000	-$5,000
1989	$170,000	$71,000	-$99,000
1991	$100,000	$93,500	-$6,500
1992	$100,000	$108,500	+$8,500
1993	$100,000	$95,000	-$5,500
1994	$100,000	$90,000	-$10,500
1995	$110,000	$115,000	+$5,000
1996	$110,000	$104,500	-$5,500
1997	$110,000	$101,000	-$9,000
1998	$110,000	$50,000	-$60,000
1999	$110,000	$50,000	-$60,000
2001	$110,000	$50,000	-$60,000
2003	$110,000	$50,000	-$60,000
2004	$120,000	$50,000	-$70,000
2005	$150,000	$71,000	-$79,000
2006	$155,000	$71,000	-$84,000
2007	$155,000	$71,000	-$84,000
2008	$155,000	$71,000	-$84,000
2009	$200,000	$61,000	-$139,000
2010	$200,000	$60,000	-$140,000
2011	$200,000	$60,000	-$140,000
2012	$250,000	$60,000	-$190,000
2013	$250,000	$60,000	-$190,000
2014	$275,000	$50,000	-$225,000
2020	$400,000	$95,000	-$305,000
2021	$400,000	$89,000	-$311,000
2022	$400,000	$95,000	-$305,000
2023	$400,000	$95,000	-$305,000

Negative attitudes towards female bodybuilding have existed ever since the creation of the sport, as the body type female bodybuilders possess is highly different from the beauty standard of a skinny and delicate woman. In Studies in Popular Culture A.J. Randall et al. describe this as the result of a patriarchal society which emphasizes that femininity is created by altering one's body to cater to society's gendered expectations When women venture away from gender expectations, society's view of their femininity begins to diminish. Female Bodybuilders experience this criticism of their body, as they build bodies which are commonly associated with the masculine identity. Despite this there is a very dedicated female bodybuilding fan base.

The International Federation of Bodybuilding & Fitness has made several rules changes on the sport of female bodybuilding that relate to expected feminine identity. In 1992, the IFBB, attempted to "feminize" the sport by making the judges deduct points from competitors who were "too big," meaning too muscular. The IFBB then made a rule change in 2000 that emphasized a need for the women to decrease muscularity once again. Before Ms. International in 2005 the IFBB created another rule that required the women competing to decrease their own muscle mass by 20 percent to compete. Yet the men's bodybuilding rules have not changed in the same time period. In Qualitative Research in Sport and Exercise Chris Shilling and Tanya Bunsell state that all of these rule changes reflect the IFBB's attempts to make women more closely fit gender expectations, as they all emphasize the need for the female bodybuilders to become less massive. Bunsell and Shilling further state that male bodybuilding has not changed because their bodies are seen as masculine in identity, while female bodybuilding rules inhibit women from reaching the same muscularity.

In the documentary film Generation Iron 2, Iris Kyle, who stated she wanted to compete at the 2016 Wings of Strength Rising Phoenix World Championships, received an email from a show promoter that she had to requalify to attend. Under the Ms. Olympia rules, former Ms. Olympia champions were qualified for life. She stated she had been to do some work with them that she doesn't "agree with", but declined the offer. When asked to clarify, she stated that "sex sells" and that female bodybuilders sometimes sell muscle worship. While she was later allowed a special invite to the 2016 Wings of Strength Rising Phoenix World Championships, she declined to attend, instead focusing on training her boyfriend, Hidetada Yamagishi, for the 2017 Arnold Classic Men's Physique and focusing on their business venture.

=== Government bans ===
- Afghanistan – Women's bodybuilding is forbidden.
- Iran – On January 18, 2017, an Iranian female bodybuilder was arrested for "nudity" after she posted selfies of her flexing sleeveless on social media. "Nude", in this context refers to women not wearing a headscarf or revealing body parts like arms and legs.

== Performance-enhancing drugs (PEDs) ==
In a 2016 article for IronMag Blog, Mike Arnold, anabolic researcher and consultant, endorsed anabolic-androgenic steroids, specifically Oxandrolone, Primobolan and Methasterone, as the most effective choice for female bodybuilders who need more muscle than what peptides and Selective androgen receptor modulator drugs can provide.

In an interview with prosecrets.ru, Nataliya Kuznetsova admitted to taking 150–200 milligrams (2.3–3.1 gr) of Primobolan or 150–200 milligrams (2.3–3.1 gr) testosterone propionate to prepare for contests, along with 2 tablets (20 milligrams (0.31 gr)) of oxandrolone tablets on training days. In a 2016 article for BroScience, James C., M.S.(C) claims Nataliya uses a "cocktail" of oestrogen blockers.

In a 2010 article for IronMag Blog, Anthony Roberts, fitness journalist, talking about a female bodybuilder's drug program, noted that on season drug intake for female bodybuilders include oxandrolone, around 10 mgs, stanozolol, around 10 mgs, clenbuterol, growth hormone, with usually about 2IU's a day, thyroid hormone (precontest phase), mesterolone, a 25-50mgs a day dosage and metenolone acetate. He stated that female bodybuilders differ from figure and fitness contestants in their off season drug intake in that typically their doses are only slightly higher, but much more experimental with what they use. He noted that testosterone propionate, trenbolone acetate, chlorodehydromethyltestosterone, nandrolone, and occasionally boldenone undecylenate are used by female bodybuilders in off season.

According to an Iron Man article, published on 1 May 2003 by Greg Zulak, who cites Dan Duchaine, author of the book Underground Steroid Handbook and worked with countless world-class female bodybuilders, listed the following performance-enhancing drugs that female bodybuilders may use:

- Oxymetholone (Anadrol)
- Oxandrolone (Anavar)
- Clenbuterol
- Nandrolone decanoate (Deca-Durabolin)
- Metandienone (Dianabol)
- Boldenone (Equipose)
- Fluoxymesterone (Halotestin)
- Human growth hormone
- Ethylestrenol (Maxibolan)
- Tamoxifen (Novaldex)
- Metenolone (Primabolan)
- Trenbolone
- Stanozolol (Winstrol)
- Testosterone

=== Policies ===
In 2001, Katie Arnoldi, a former bodybuilder who wrote the book Chemical Pink about her bodybuilding career, said industry insiders know what goes on, but the sport is reluctant to test bodybuilders more strictly for steroids because big physiques draw big profits. In the 2005 television documentary Supersize She, when Joanna Thomas was asked about steroid usage she said sarcastically "Yeah it's all about the steroids, you know. We just take steroids and look like this. Try this at home everyone, for a few weeks, and see how you look." She also said "Take what you like. A lot of people would not look like me. It's all of my life since I was 15 years old, dedication to this sport. It's not just about what people take. It's this.", as she pointed to her brain. In 2020, after Joanna died, her mother, Mary, in a statement said that when Joanna was 20 years old she moved to Manchester and began taking steroids. Her GP surgery said she had used steroids and anabolic steroids in her bodybuilding career, as well as illegal drugs and prescribed medications.

In 2022, in an interview on Physical World with Ahn Si-hyeon, Iris Kyle admitted that after her first two amateur bodybuilding contests she competed in, she began taking performance-enhancing substances (PEDs). She said she was motivated to do so because she was 130 lb (59 kg) as an amateur bodybuilding and felt tiny compared to other amateur female bodybuilders on stage. She stating that there was "no way for a woman to develop the type of muscle density that we (female bodybuilders) carry today without it (PEDs)" and that "it's part of the sport (female bodybuilding)". She advised women that "there wasn't a whole lot a women could take (PEDs)" as "the majority of things (PEDs) were for men". She also advised women to do research and be careful with dosages because the female bodybuilder physique takes time to develop.

==== Policies of the International Federation of Bodybuilding and Fitness Professional League (IFBB Pro League) ====
According to the 2008 MSNBC documentary Hooked: Muscle Women, the IFBB Pro League does not routinely drug test athletes who compete in the federation. Also in the documentary, Kristy Hawkins said she thought steroids were "prevalent in every sport, but with us it's just more obvious."

==== Policies of the IFBB Pro League and the National Physique Committee (NPC) ====
In 2001, Sandy Ranalli of the NPC said drug testing can just be too expensive. "To be honest with you, we're such a small sport, it's just not financially feasible," says Ranalli of drug testing the athletes. She said, however, they try to do random testing occasionally. Ranalli also said that: "There's steroids in every sport … But to say you're not going to get to the competitive level … without steroids, that itself is false."

==== Mitigation efforts ====
Bodybuilding causes increased lean body mass and decreased body fat, which causes breast tissue reduction in female athletes whereas the current trend regarding the judges' search for "feminine" physique at competitions makes compensative breast augmentation with breast implants an increasingly popular procedure among female bodybuilders. It is estimated that 80% of professional female bodybuilders get breast implants so they can maintain upper to lower body symmetry.

==== Surveys and studies on side effects ====
- A 1985 interview of ten weight-trained women athletes who consistently used anabolic steroids were interviewed about their patterns of drug use and the perceived effects. Anabolic steroids were used in a cyclical manner, often with several drugs taken simultaneously. All participants believed that muscle size and strength were increased in association with anabolic steroid use. Most also noted a deepening of the voice, increased facial hair, increased aggressiveness, clitoral enlargement, and menstrual irregularities. The participants were willing to tolerate these side effects but thought that such changes might be unacceptable to many women.
- A 1989 study of competitive female bodybuilders from Kansas and Missouri found that 10% use steroids on a regular basis. The female bodybuilders reported that they had used an average of two different steroids including nandrolone, oxandrolone, testosterone, metandienone, boldenone, and stanozolol.
- A 1991 study of nine female weightlifters using steroids and seven not using these agents has found that it appears that the self-administration of testosterone and anabolic steroids is increasingly practiced by women in sports where strength and endurance are important. Of the nine anabolic steroid users, seven took multiple anabolic steroids simultaneously. Thirty-fold elevations of serum testosterone were noted in the women injecting testosterone. In three of these women serum testosterone levels exceeded the upper limits for normal male testosterone concentrations. A significant compensatory decrease in sex hormone-binding globulin and a decrease in thyroid-binding proteins were noted in the women steroid users. Also, a 39% decrease in high-density lipoprotein cholesterol was noted in the steroid-using weightlifters. Most of the subjects in this study used anabolic steroids continuously, which raises concern about premature atherosclerosis and other disease processes developing in these women.
- A 2000 survey found that one-third of the female bodybuilders reported past or current steroid use and almost half of those who were non-steroid users admitted use of performance-enhancing drugs such as ephedrine. The study investigators found that women who used steroids were more muscular than their non-steroid-using counterparts and were also more likely to use other performance-enhancing substances. Despite its popularity among female bodybuilding, usage of steroids among female bodybuilders, unlike male bodybuilding, is a taboo subject and rarely admitted use among female bodybuilders. Although the IFBB officially bans the usage of performance-enhancing drugs, it does not test athletes rigorously.
- A 2009 survey of both men and women found that while men overall use anabolic–androgenic steroids, more women than men who use anabolic–androgenic steroids were competitive bodybuilders or weightlifters, with only 33.3% describing themselves as "recreational lifters" with no interest in competition. The survey found that 75% of the women experienced clitoral enlargement, half had irregular periods and showed changes in their voices. Despite this 90% said they would continue to use steroids.

== Cultural references ==
Release date	Media title	Episode title	Media type
3 May 1985	Pumping Iron II: The Women		American documentary film
1995	Geraldo		American daytime television tabloid talk show
2000	On the Inside	Bodybuilders	American television documentary show
18 August 2000	The Cell		American-German film
16 October 2000	Louis Theroux's Weird Weekends	Body Building	British television documentary show
2001	The Greatest Bodies		American television documentary
3 May 2002	Sabrina the Teenage Witch	Driving Mr. Goodman	American television sitcom
2 February 2003	The Simpsons	The Strong Arms of the Ma	American animated sitcom
18 October 2004	Taboo	Gender Benders	American documentary television show
12 December 2004	Totally Spies!	The Incredible Bulk	French-Canadian children and teenagers' animated action comedy sitcom
April 2005	Supersize She		British television documentary
19 January 2008	Bigger, Stronger, Faster*		American documentary film
27 April 2008	Hooked: Muscle Women		American television documentary
?	The Oliver Geissen Show		German talk show
9 September 2008	Wipeout	The Special Episode	American television game show
9 May 2010	Twisted Sisters		American documentary film
12 May 2017	Generation Iron 2		American documentary film
7 June 2017	Swole	The Last of the Iron Sisters	American-Canadian documentary webisode series
11 February 2019	American Dad!	One-Woman Swole	American adult animated sitcom
8 March 2024	Love Lies Bleeding		American romantic crime drama film

== Notable places ==
- Powerhouse Gym, Highland Park, Michigan - The gym Andrea Shaw trains at and the gym Lenda Murray trained at.
- Gold's Gym, Venice, Los Angeles, California - A gym that numerous professional female bodybuilders have trained at, such as Michaela Aycock, Nicole Bass, Sheila Bleck, Juliette Bergmann, Dayana Cadeau, Kim Chizevsky-Nicholls, Laura Creavalle, Cory Everson, Iris Kyle, Rachel McLish, Lenda Murray, Yaxeni Oriquen-Garcia, Alina Popa, Joanna Thomas and Helle Trevino.
- Las Vegas Convention Center - The venue for the Ms. Olympia prejudging from 2006–2014 & 2024.
- Trinity Auditorium - The venue for 1979 Robby Robinson Classic. It is the oldest standing known venue for a female bodybuilding contest that has not been demolished.
- Greater Columbus Convention Center, Exhibit Hall D - The venue for the Ms. International prejudging from 2000–2013.
- Grand Hyatt Tampa Bay - The venue for the Chicago Pro women's bodybuilding from 2008-present.

== See also ==
- Jake Wood (bodybuilding)
- Bill Dobbins
- List of professional female bodybuilders
- List of professional bodybuilding competitions
- List of female fitness & figure competitors
- Pumping Iron II: The Women
- Sthenolagnia
- Strongwoman
- Supersize She
- Women's Physique World
