= Doris Barrilleaux =

Doris Barrilleaux (August 11, 1931–2018) was an American bodybuilder and photographer. Her efforts toward promoting and documenting female bodybuilding earned her the nickname of "First Lady of Bodybuilding".

Barrilleaux, who competed in her first bodybuilding event when she was 46, founded the Superior Physique Association and American Federation of Women Bodybuilders (AFWB), and served on the women's committees for both the Amateur Athletic Union (AAU) and the International Fitness and Bodybuilding Federation (IFBB). She was inducted into the National Fitness Hall of Fame. Her photographs of bodybuilding events and competitors appeared in many fitness magazines.

== Personal life ==
Doris Jean Biering was born in Houston, Texas, on August 11, 1931. Her father worked for the American Can Company. She married Sterling Barrilleaux at age 16 and had five children. She became a grandmother at age 36. One of her sons died in a motorcycle accident, and another son died of AIDS. Doris and Sterling divorced in 1987.

Barrilleaux was a victim of the Mutual Benefits Corporation's ponzi scheme, and sued the company for breach of fiduciary duty, breach of contract, and negligence.

== Bodybuilding competitions ==
Soon after her fourth child was born in 1955, Barrilleaux found herself unable to hang by her knees on the bars at a neighborhood playground, and that motivated her to consider the role of physical fitness in her life. She created her own fitness routine from tips she found in men's weight training magazines, and began training at a gym when she found one that would allow women. When her family moved in 1959 to Brandon, Florida, she was unable to find a similar gym so she purchased her own equipment and continued training at home.

Barrilleaux sent a photo of herself to Strength & Health magazine in 1962, but it was returned because it was felt that her pose was "too masculine". She provided a more conventional photo, which appeared in the February 1963 issue. The refusal of the first photo in which she demonstrated a double-biceps pose started her thinking about gender politics in weight training.

Her family moved to the New Orleans area in 1963 and both she and her husband began training at the Imperial Health Club. She became a flight attendant in 1967, the same year that she became a grandmother. In 1970, the family moved back to Florida, where she worked in a pharmacy and provided bookkeeping for her husband's new business.

Barrilleaux's first competition was at the Canton Nationals in June, 1978, where she placed third, which she was proud of as she was 46 at the time and her competitors were in their teens and twenties. She followed this up with a number of guest poses at men's bodybuilding competitions such as Mr. Southeastern and Mr. Tampa. Barrilleaux took photos at bodybuilding competitions and handed out trophies.

Early women's competitions at bodybuilding meets were beauty contests. The first official female bodybuilding contest that judged contestants in areas such as muscular development, symmetry, and physique presentation, took place in Ohio in 1977. However, in 1978, the first female bodybuilding event sanctioned by the International Federation of Bodybuilders that awarded prize money was more of a beauty contest with little value placed on physique and in which contestants were required to wear high heels. Barrilleaux described some of the contestants as "models that twirled" and "hoochy-koochy burlesque types".

She competed in the 1979 IFBB Best in the World, which was disrupted by Laura Combes disregarding "feminity" rules against muscular poses. Barrilleaux told a reporter, "What worries me in trying to get a new thing like this off the ground is that women will look at Laura and get turned off to bodybuilding. They will say, 'I don't want to look like that.' It will scare them. It could kill the whole movement." She won Miss Gold Coast in the over-35 category in 1980.

== Bodybuilding organizations and promotion ==
Barrilleaux, with Suzanne Kosak and Linda Gleason, formed the Southeastern Physique Association (SPA) in October, 1978, changing the name to the Superior Physique Association in 1979. She preferred term "physique" to distinguish between bodybuilding ideals for men and women. Barrilleaux felt it was important that a women's bodybuilding organization be run by women, and declined an invitation to join the SPA to Henry McGhee's United States Women's Physique Association.

SPA chapters were established in Hawaii, San Francisco, Houston, Chicago, Wichita, Norfolk, Key West, Boca Raton, and Tampa. Barrilleaux organized and competed in the SPA's first official competition, Miss Brandon Physique, in April, 1979, in which she placed seventh. This was the first competition for women bodybuilders that was organized and run by women. SPA held six more events that year.

She served on both of the new women's committees established by the Amateur Athletic Union (AAU) and the International Fitness and Bodybuilding Federation (IFBB). In 1980, she was elected the chair of the IFBB Women's Committee. At the request of the IFBB president, Barrilleaux formed the American Federation of Women Bodybuilders (AFWB) under the umbrella of the IFBB and disbanded the SPA.

Under Barrilleaux's direction, the AFWB established standards similar to SPA's, promoting more of a feminine aesthetic than a muscular one. Her advocacy for two different competitive classes—"bodybuilders" and "body sculptors"—failed to gain support. She opposed women working toward excessive muscle bulk and worried that those women who did scare women away from the sport. She stepped down as chair of the AFWB committee in 1982 as some officials and competitors pushed for a more muscular approach to judging, and left the committee in 1984. Barrilleaux frequently spoke out against steroids and other drugs in bodybuilding.

Within IFBB, Barrilleaux contributed to standards, rules, and regulations for judging women's bodybuilding. In 1983, she began lobbying International Federation of Bodybuilders "to test women competitors for illicit performance-enhancing drugs". She was head judge at the World Championships in Australia in 1984, a judge for the first Miss Olympia competition, and one of two head judges for 1981 Miss Olympia.

In 2004, she received the Vic Boff Award from the Association of Oldetime Barbell & Strongmen. In 2011, Barrilleaux was inducted into the National Fitness Hall of Fame.

== Photography ==
In the 1980s and '90s, Barrilleaux was a major physique photographer. Her photographs appeared regularly in Florida Muscle News. She photographed and reported on bodybuilding contests for MuscleMag International and other bodybuilding publications. Barrilleaux stopped photographing bodybuilding shows in 2004.

== Writing ==
Her first book, Inside Weight Training for Women, co-authored with Jim Murray, was published in 1978. She published Forever Fit in 1983.

She wrote the column "Curves and Peaks" in Muscle Training Illustrated magazine. In 1988, Barrilleaux joined Tampa Bay Magazine to contribute fitness advice.

== Media appearances ==
Photographs of Barrilleaux have appeared on more than 70 magazine covers, including MuscleMag International, Strength & Health, Muscular Development, Playgirl, and Pleine Forme. On television, she appeared on Real People and 20/20. She also made appearances on To Tell the Truth, What's My Line, I've Got a Secret, and Sportsworld. Barrilleaux's appearance on Real People gave the sport of female bodybuilding national exposure.

She filmed a 1981 TV pilot for Body Sculpture by Doris which never aired. Barrilleaux appeared in the 1985 documentary Pumping Iron II: The Women. She was featured in season 2, episode 16 of Vanity Insanity which aired in 2017.

Barrilleaux created a DVD-based ebook memoir consisting of 159 chapters, 63 video clips, and thousands of photos, titled And I Did!.

== Collections ==
Barrilleaux donated physical and digitized collection of correspondence, magazines, posters, videotapes, audiotapes, and photographs to the H.J. Lutcher Stark Center for Physical Culture and Sports and donated additional memorabilia to the Todd-McLean Library.

== See also ==
- Kike Elomaa
- Lisa Lyon
- Rachel McLish
