= Stacey Bentley =

Competitive bodybuilder

- Professional bodybuilder

Personal info
- Born: July 1, 1957; Philadelphia, Pennsylvania, U.S.
- Died: December 31, 2019 (aged 62); Wayne, Pennsylvania

Best statistics

Professional (Pro) career
- Pro-debut: NPC Emerald Cup Champion; 1990
- Best win: 1979 IFBB Frank Zane Pro Invitational Champion; 1979–1980
- Active: Retired 1981

Stacey Bentley (July 1, 1957 – December 31, 2019) was a registered nurse and former professional female bodybuilder of the late 1970s and early 1980s. Along with Claudia Wilbourn and Rachel McLish, Bentley was among the first role models of bodybuilding for women and the benefits that it can bring to them. She died on December 31, 2019.

== Biography ==
Bentley was born in Philadelphia, Pennsylvania, where at a young age she was a very active, sports-oriented child. In her high school days she was a diver and later continued her education at Franconia College in New Hampshire. It was around 1975 that Bentley discovered weight training (which was an unusual interest for women at that time) and decided to train with the goal of achieving a healthy fit physique.

Although she admired muscular, fit women, Bentley felt uncomfortable admitting that she weight trained to achieve her toned body. She would often say that she was a gymnast, or a swimmer, and would not attribute her physique to weight training workouts, due to the discomfort she felt from the way people perceived her.

Bentley moved to Los Angeles and quickly became a role model for women's bodybuilding while working with Joe Gold and Arnold Schwarzenegger and competing in the first bodybuilding show. She worked as a women's supervisor at the Sports Connection while training hard for upcoming bodybuilding shows.

Her career as a bodybuilder took off on June 16, 1979, at the inaugural Women's World Bodybuilding Championships, where she competed against bodybuilding stars such as Lisa Lyon (who won the contest), Claudia Wilbourn, and others. Bentley finished in the top five in that contest.

Later that year Bentley won the Robby Robinson Classic, also winning awards for best legs and best poser. Bentley continued with two more victories, winning the World Couples Championships (with Chris Dickerson) and the Frank Zane Invitational. Her last bodybuilding contest was the inaugural IFBB Miss Olympia, where she placed fifth.

Bentley retired after the Olympia when she realized that the up and coming women of bodybuilding were starting to have huge muscles like men (i.e. taking anabolic steroids) and that turned her off. She switched from lifting weights competitively to general weight training and cardiovascular exercise. She then became a personal trainer for people such as actor Jack Nicholson and others.

Bentley continued to be a role model to people to improve themselves physically and mentally through bodybuilding as a personal trainer. She also helped people through her work as a nurse at Northridge Hospital in California, where she focused on patients with eating disorders. She would later work with blind and deaf children at a Pennsylvania school, then help children with various diseases and disabilities. She worked with the geriatric population, helping them in the gym and out and helps to make their lives more comfortable and happier.

Stacey was able to overcome many obstacles, but continued her career as a nurse in her home state of Pennsylvania until 2011. She maintained contact with the bodybuilding world, and in 2005 she was inducted into the IFBB Hall of Fame.

Bentley's career as a competitive bodybuilder stands out, despite its brevity, for her placing in the top five in each of the six bodybuilding contests that she competed in. Her competitive career was also unique in that each of the bodybuilding contests that she competed in marked the inaugural staging of that event.

== Contest history ==
- 1979 IFBB Women's World Bodybuilding Championships - 4th
- 1979 IFBB Best in the World - 3rd
- 1979 IFBB World's Best Built Woman - 3rd
- 1979 IFBB Robby Robinson Classic - 1st (Best legs Award winner, Best Poser Award winner, and overall winner)
- 1980 IFBB World Couples Championships - 1st (with Chris Dickerson)
- 1980 IFBB Frank Zane Invitational - 1st
- 1980 IFBB Miss Olympia - 5th
