= Pudgy =

Pudgy may refer to:

- Abbye "Pudgy" Stockton (1917–2006), American professional strongwoman
- John "Pudgy" Dunn (1896–1937), American gangster
- Pudgy the Puppy, an animated character in Betty Boop films
