= Claudia Wilbourn =

American bodybuilder

- Professional bodybuilder

Personal info
- Born: 1951 (age 74–75); U.S.

Best statistics

Professional (Pro) career
- Pro-debut: 1980 Ms. California Champion; 1979
- Best win: 1980 NPC Nationals Overall Champion; 1979-1980
- Active: Retired 1982

Claudia Wilbourn (born circa 1951) is a former professional female bodybuilder from the United States.

One of the leading figures in the early days of women's bodybuilding, Wilbourn began heavy training in 1971. She competed in the first Women’s World Bodybuilding Championships in June 1979, finishing second to Lisa Lyon. In 1980 she won the title of Ms. California, then finished second by one point to Laura Combes at the NPC Nationals. She made one Ms. Olympia appearance, finishing 17th in the 1982 contest. Wilbourn was inducted into the IFBB Hall of Fame in 2006.

== Contest history ==
- 1979 Women's World Bodybuilding Championships - 2nd
- 1979 Robby Robinson Classic - 6th
- 1980 United States Championship - 3rd
- 1980 Ms. California - 1st
- 1980 NPC Nationals - 2nd
- 1982 IFBB Ms. Olympia - 17th
