= Ernie Shepherd =

Ernie Shepherd may refer to:

- Ernie Shepherd (footballer)
- Ernie Shepherd (politician)

== See also ==
- Ernie Shepard, American jazz double-bassist and vocalist
- Ernestine Shepherd, American bodybuilder
- E. H. Shepard, English artist and book illustrator
