= Edith Connor =

American bodybuilder (1935–2020)

Edith Wilma Jean Conner (September 5, 1935 – November 28, 2020), known as Edith Connor, was an American bodybuilder who was declared the oldest competitive female bodybuilder by the Guinness Book of World Records in 2012, when she was 77, breaking the record of Ernestine Shepherd.

== Biography ==
Conner was born in Denver, Colorado on September 5, 1935. She began bodybuilding because she felt she was too sedentary in her job doing data entry. She entered her first bodybuilding competition (the Grand Masters in Las Vegas) on her 65th birthday, winning first place. She was also a personal trainer. She exercised at least three times a week and did not diet.

She notably competed in the 2011 NPC Armbrust Pro Gym Warrior Classic Championships in Loveland, Colorado, at the age of 75 years and 349 days.

Her husband of 57 years, Reuben, died in 2011. She had three sons, seven grandchildren, and six great-grandchildren. Conner died on November 28, 2020, at the age of 85.
