= Jules Bacon =

American bodybuilder (1917–2007)

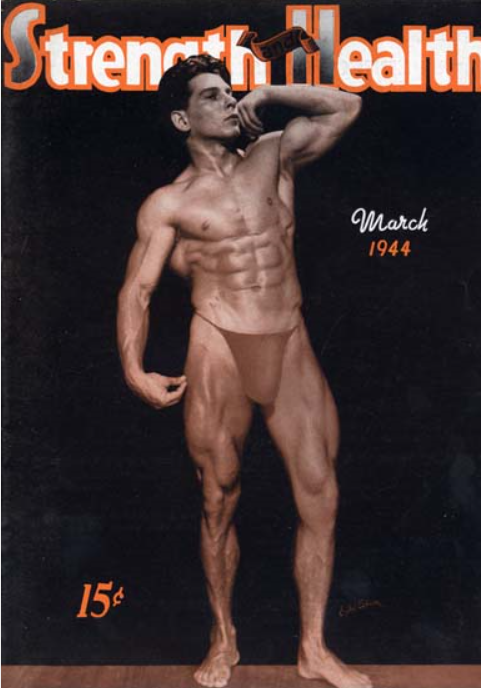
- Bacon in 1944
- Born: July 8, 1917; Philadelphia, Pennsylvania, U.S.
- Died: January 13, 2007 (aged 89); York, Pennsylvania, U.S.
- Occupation: Bodybuilder

Jules S. Bacon (July 8, 1917 – January 13, 2007) was an American professional bodybuilder.

Bacon was born in Philadelphia, Pennsylvania. He began weight training at age 20 and came second in the 1941 Mr. America bodybuilding contest. He won Mr. America in 1943. He wrote for the magazine Strength & Health and was featured in bodybuilding magazines in the 1940s. He worked for York Barbell. Bacon was a lifelong friend of John Grimek.

Bacon founded the Jules Bacon Health Clubs in York, Pennsylvania. He was inducted into the International Federation of Bodybuilding & Fitness Hall of Fame.

Bacon died in York, Pennsylvania, aged 89.
