= Marcus Leatherdale =

Canadian portrait photographer (1952–2022)

Marcus Leatherdale (18 September 1952 – 22 April 2022) was a Canadian portrait photographer.

== Biography ==
=== Early life and education ===
Marcus Andrew Leatherdale was born on 18 September 1952, in Montreal, Canada, to Jack Leatherdale, a veterinarian, and Grace Leatherdale, a homemaker. He attended the San Francisco Art Institute.

=== New York City ===
Leatherdale arrived in New York City in 1978, where he attended the School of Visual Arts. started his career in New York City during the early eighties, setting up a studio on Grand Street.

Leatherdale first served as Robert Mapplethorpe's office manager for a while and was photographed in the nude by the master, grabbing a rope with his right hand and holding a rabbit in his left.

Thereafter he worked as an assistant curator to Sam Wagstaff. He soon became a darling of the then-vibrant club scene and the fashionable media: Interview, Details, The New Yorker, Vanity Fair, and Elle Decor presented his work. Later on he was featured in artsy publications such as Artforum, Art News, and Art in America. He documented the New York City lifestyle, the extraordinary people of Danceteria and Club 57 where he staged his first exhibits in 1980. Leatherdale was an acute observer of the New York City of the 1980s. His models were the unknown but exceptional ones – like Larissa, Claudia Summers or Ruby Zebra – or well-known artists – like Madonna, Keith Haring, Andy Warhol, Winston Tong and Divine, Trisha Brown, Lisa Lyon, Andrée Putman, Kathy Acker, Jodie Foster, and fellow photographer John Dugdale. For quite a while Leatherdale remained in Mapplethorpe's shadow, but was soon discovered as a creative force in his own right by Christian Michelides, the founder of Molotov Art Gallery in Vienna. Leatherdale flew to Vienna, presented his work there and was acclaimed by public and press.

This international recognition paved the way to museums and permanent collections such as the Rheinisches Landesmuseum Bonn, the Art Institute of Chicago, the Australian National Gallery in Canberra, the London Museum in London, Ontario, and Austria's Albertina. Above all, his arresting portraits of New York City celebrities in the series Hidden Identities aroused long-lasting interest among curators and collectors.

=== India ===
In 1993 Leatherdale began spending half of each year in India's holy city of Banaras. Based in an ancient house in the centre of the old city, he began photographing the diverse and remarkable people there, from the holy men to celebrities, from royalty to tribals, carefully negotiating his way among some of India's most elusive figures to make his portraits. From the outset, he intended to pay homage to the timeless spirit of India through a highly specific portrayal of its individuals. His pictures include princesses and boatmen, movie stars and circus performers, and street beggars and bishops, mothers and children in traditional garb. Leatherdale explored how essentially unaffected much of the country was by the passage of time, and it has been remarked upon that this approach is distinctly post-colonial. In 1999, Leatherdale relocated to Chottanagpur (Jharkhand) where he focused on the Adivasis. Later Serra da Estrela in the mountains of central Portugal became his second home base.

Leatherdale's matte printing techniques, which adapt nineteenth-century processes and employ half black, half sepia colourations, reinforce the timelessness of his subjects. Tones and matte surfaces effectively differentiate his portraits from the easy slickness of fashion photography.

=== Later life and death ===
In 2019 Mr Leatherdale compiled his work from the 80s in a book entitled "Out of the Shadows", written with Summers.

Leatherdale suffered a stroke in 2021. He committed suicide at the age of 69 on 22 April 2022 at his home in Mcluskieganj, India. He is survived by a brother, Robert, and an adopted son, Kailash.

== Personal life and relationships ==
In 1979 Leatherdale married his close friend and muse Claudia Summers to stay in the United States. The couple divorced in 2018.

During his time in New York City, he dated Robert Mapplethorpe, whose photography studio Leatherdale managed. His partner of two decades, Jorge Serio, died in July 2021.

== Major exhibitions ==
- 1980 Urban Women, Club 57, NYC
- 1980 Danceteria, NYC
- 1981 Stilvende, NYC
- 1982 The Clock Tower, PS1, NYC
- 1982 544 Natoma Gallery, San Francisco
- 1982 Eiko And Komo, Stilvende, NYC
- 1983 Form And Function Gallery, Atlanta
- 1983 Galerie in der GGK Wien, Vienna, Austria
- 1983 The Ring, Vienna (organized by Molotov)
- 1983 London Regional Art Gallery, London, Ontario, Canada
- 1984 Performance, Greathouse Gallery, NYC
- 1984 Social Segments, Grey Art Gallery, NYU
- 1984 Rheinisches Landesmuseum, Bonn
- 1985 Ritual, Greathouse Gallery, NYC
- 1985 Artinzer, Munich
- 1985 Leatherdale/Noguchi, Gallery 291, Atlanta
- 1985 Paul Cava Gallery, Philadelphia
- 1986 Poison Ivy, Greathouse Gallery, NYC
- 1986 Wessel O’Connor Gallery, Rome
- 1986 Hidden Identities, Michael Todd Gallery, Palladium, NYC
- 1987 Demigods, Greathouse Gallery, NYC
- 1987 Collier Gallery, Scottsdale, Arizona
- 1987 Tunnel Gallery, NYC
- 1988 Claus Runkel Fine Art Ltd., London, UK
- 1988 Madison Art Center, Madison
- 1989 Wessel-O’Connor Gallery, NYC
- 1989 Summer Night Festival, Onikoube, Sendai
- 1990 Bent Sikkema Fine Art, NYC
- 1990 Fahey-Klein Gallery, Los Angeles
- 1990 Faye Gold Gallery, Atlanta
- 1990 Mayan Theatre, Los Angeles
- 1991 Runkel Hue-Williams Gallery, London
- 1991 Galerie Michael Neumann, Düsseldorf
- 1991 Arthur Rogers Gallery, New Orleans
- 1992 Arthur Rogers, NYC
- 1992 Galerie Del Conte, Milwaukee
- 1993 Galerie Bardamu, NYC
- 1996 Faye Gold Gallery, Atlanta
- 1996, 1997, 1998, 1999 Bridgewater/Lustberg, NYC
- 1998 Rai Krishna Das Trust-Banaras, India
- 1999 Birla Academy Of Art And Culture, Kolkata, India
- 2000 Paradise Road Gallery – Colombo, Sri Lanka
- 2000 Dialectica – NYC
- 2001 Bridgewater / Lustberg / Blumenfeld, NYC
- 2002 Centre For Photography As An Art-Form, Mumbai
- 2003 John Stevenson Gallery, NYC
- 2003 Kapil Jariwala Gallery, London
- 2004 Lehmann Leskiw + Schedler, Toronto
- 2005 Basel Art Fair, Miami
- 2005 and 2006 Melody Weir Gallery, NYC
- 2007 Lehmann Leskiw Fine Art Gallery, Toronto
- 2009 Bharat-India, Galeria AR-PAB, Lisboa
- 2009 "Mujeres en Plural", Museo Foundation Canal, Madrid
- 2010 Matthieu Foss Gallery, Mumbai, India
- 2010 Ralph Pucci Gallery, NYC
- 2011 Galerie Bernardo Marques, Lisboa, Portugal
- 2017 MoMA, New York USA
- 2019 Throckmorton Fine Art, New York, NY

== Books ==
- New York 1983. His photographs and text by Kathy Acker and Christian Michelides. A book in a series on people and years. Vienna: Molotov 1983, ISBN 978-3-9503703-1-7
- Marcus Leatherdale: 1984–1987. Introduction by Brooks Adams. Greathouse Gallery 1987
- Marcus Leatherdale 1980–1994. 2009
- Hidden Identities.Selected Images from Details magazine 1982 to 1990. 2009
- Facing India. Portraits of Bharat-India. Westzone Pub Ltd 2010 ISBN 978-1903391266
- Adivasi. Portraits of Tribal India.
- Out of the Shadows. Marcus Leatherdale: Photographs. New York City 1980–1992 by Marcus Leatherdale, Claudia Summers, Paul Bridgewater. London: ACC Art Books, 2019.

In 2010, Marcus Leatherdale founded www.theOMENmag.com a quarterly online Art magazine of which he was the art editor and art director.
