= Nataliya Kuznetsova =

Russian bodybuilder (born 1991)

- ♀ Professional bodybuilder
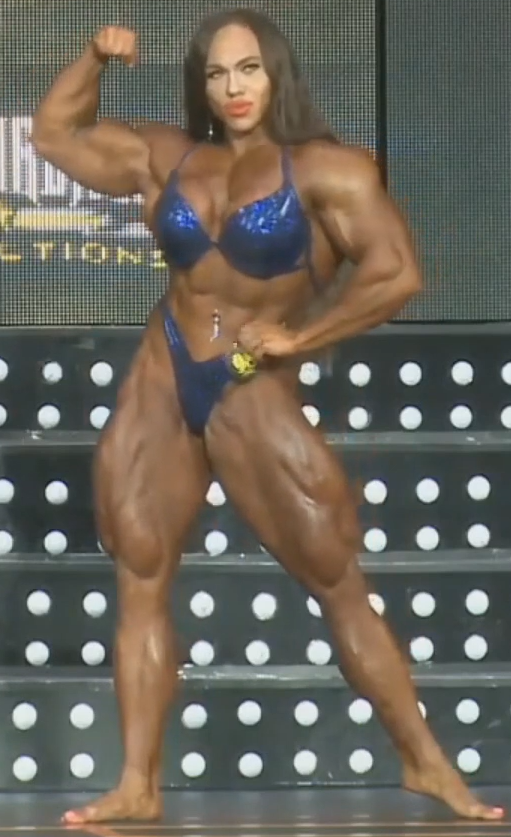
- Nataliya Kuznetsova doing a single bicep flex at the 2019 IFBB Romania Muscle Fest Pro on 3 November 2019.

Personal info
- Nickname: Amazonka
- Born: January 7, 1991 (age 35); Chita, Chitinsky District, Zabaykalsky Krai, Russian Federation

Best statistics
- Height: 5 ft 7 in (170 cm)
- Weight: 220 lb (99,79 kg) More than 100 kg in off-season

Professional (Pro) career
- Pro-debut: Romania Muscle Fest Pro; 2019
- Active: Since 2005
Medals
2nd	2019 Romania Muscle Fest Pro	Female bodybuilding
- Information about the competitions in which she participated are available in: https://www.openpowerlifting.org/u/natalyakuznetsova and https://5percentnutrition.com/pages/nataliya-amazonka

Nataliya "Amazonka" Kuznetsova, also spelled Natalia (née Trukhina; born July 1, 1991), is a Russian professional female bodybuilder and powerlifter, recognized as one of the strongest and most muscular women in the world. She began powerlifting at fourteen years of age in an attempt to gain muscle mass.

== Biography ==
Nataliya was born in Chita, Russia. She started weightlifting when she was 14. Kuznetsova weighed 40 kilograms and wanted to gain muscle mass. When she was 15, her first coach recommended she try bodybuilding, and she became a champion in the region of Zabaykalsky Krai. Then, she fully transitioned into bodybuilding and powerlifting, ultimately achieving significant success in both disciplines. In 2008, Kuznetsova moved to live in Moscow and began studying at the university at the Moscow State Academy of Physical Culture, where she graduated in 2013. She currently lives in Montenegro, with her husband Vladislav Kuznetsov. Nataliya is still competing in multiple categories, and she is open about using anabolic steroids and other P.E.D.s (performance-enhancing drugs).

== Measurements ==
- Biceps - 20.08 inches (51.0 cm)
- Chest - 50 inches (130 cm)
- Height - 5 ft 7 in (170 cm)
- Thighs - 30.12 inches (76.5 cm)
- Waist - 27.9 inches (71 cm)

== Personal records ==
- Bench press (raw) - 176.3 kg (27 st 11 lb)
- Squats (raw) - 308 kg (48 st 7 lb)
- Deadlift (raw) - 352 kg
