= Women's Physique World =

Female bodybuilding magazine

- January/February 1995 issue
- Categories: Female bodybuilding
- Publisher: Women's Physique World, Inc.
- First issue: Fall 1984
- Final issue: 2006
- Country: United States
- Based in: Midland Park, N.J.
- Website: wpwmagazineonline.com
- ISSN: 1069-4927
- OCLC: 25289389

Women's Physique World was a magazine covering female bodybuilding and fitness and figure competition, published from 1984 to 2006.

== History and profile ==
The first issue was dated Fall 1984, and featured Lori Walkup on the cover. Subsequently, the magazine was published with varying frequency, ranging from two to six issues annually.

Women's Physique World also produced documentary style videos that featured the women posing in non-contest settings in bikinis, dresses, and other outfits. Most of the videos feature bodybuilders or fitness and figure competitors, but athletes from sports such as arm wrestling and track & field were occasionally featured. The videos often included footage of the subjects performing gym workouts, as well as interview segments. Women's Physique World also produced a number of contest videos. These typically featured NPC level shows, though the magazine also produced the video for the 1999 Ms. Olympia contest.

Human sexuality scholar Cindy Patton observed that the female bodybuilders in Women's Physique World are shown as "fresh-faced girls who seem to have accidentally produced their specialized shape".
