= Bill Dobbins =

American photographer

Bill Dobbins (born 1943) was an American photographer who specialized in bodybuilding, physique and fitness photography. In particular, Dobbins is well known for his work in photographing female bodybuilders and has published two books of images on the subject, The Women and Modern Amazons.

Dobbins was associated with Ben Weider and bodybuilding organizations such as the IFBB and NPC. Dobbins is also an author and writer for physique magazines. He has collaborated with Arnold Schwarzenegger on several books, including Arnold's Bodybuilding For Men and The New Encyclopedia of Modern Bodybuilding.

== Career and history ==
After working in Europe, predominantly in the music industry, Dobbins returned to America to work as a radio producer, primarily at WNBC and WABC in New York City. He eventually moved to California where he became involved with the original Gold's Gym. During this period Dobbins met several male bodybuilders, such as Arnold Schwarzenegger, and undertook promotional work for the gym. This attracted the attention of Joe Weider, and Dobbins began writing for Muscle & Fitness, eventually being made a founding editor of Flex magazine.
