= Abbye "Pudgy" Stockton =

American professional strongwoman (1917–2006)

- Professional bodybuilder
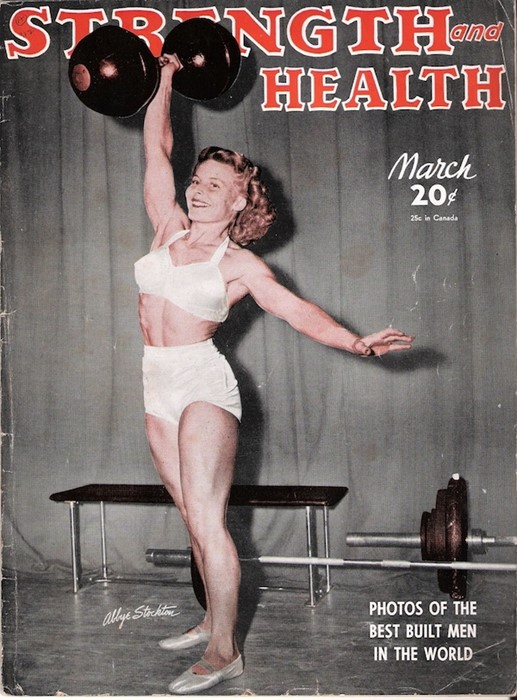
- Stockton on the cover of a 1948 issue of Strength & Health magazine.

Personal info
- Nickname: Pudgy
- Born: Abbye Eville; August 11, 1917; California, U.S.
- Died: June 26, 2006 (aged 88); Santa Monica, California, U.S.

Best statistics
- Height: 5 ft 2 in (1.57 m)
- Weight: 115 lb (52 kg)

Professional (Pro) career
- Pro-debut: 1948 Miss Physical Culture Venus; 1948
- Best win: 1948 Miss Physical Culture Venus; 1948
- Active: Retired

Abbye "Pudgy" Stockton, née Eville (August 11, 1917 – June 26, 2006), was an American professional strongwoman and forerunner of present-day female bodybuilders, who became famous through her involvement with Muscle Beach in the 1940s.

== Early life ==
Abbye Eville was born on August 11, 1917, and moved to Santa Monica, California, in 1924. She acquired the nickname "Pudgy" as a child, and the name stuck, even though she weighed approximately 115 pounds at a height of 5'2". She began dating UCLA student Les Stockton during her senior year of high school; they were married in 1941.

== Career ==
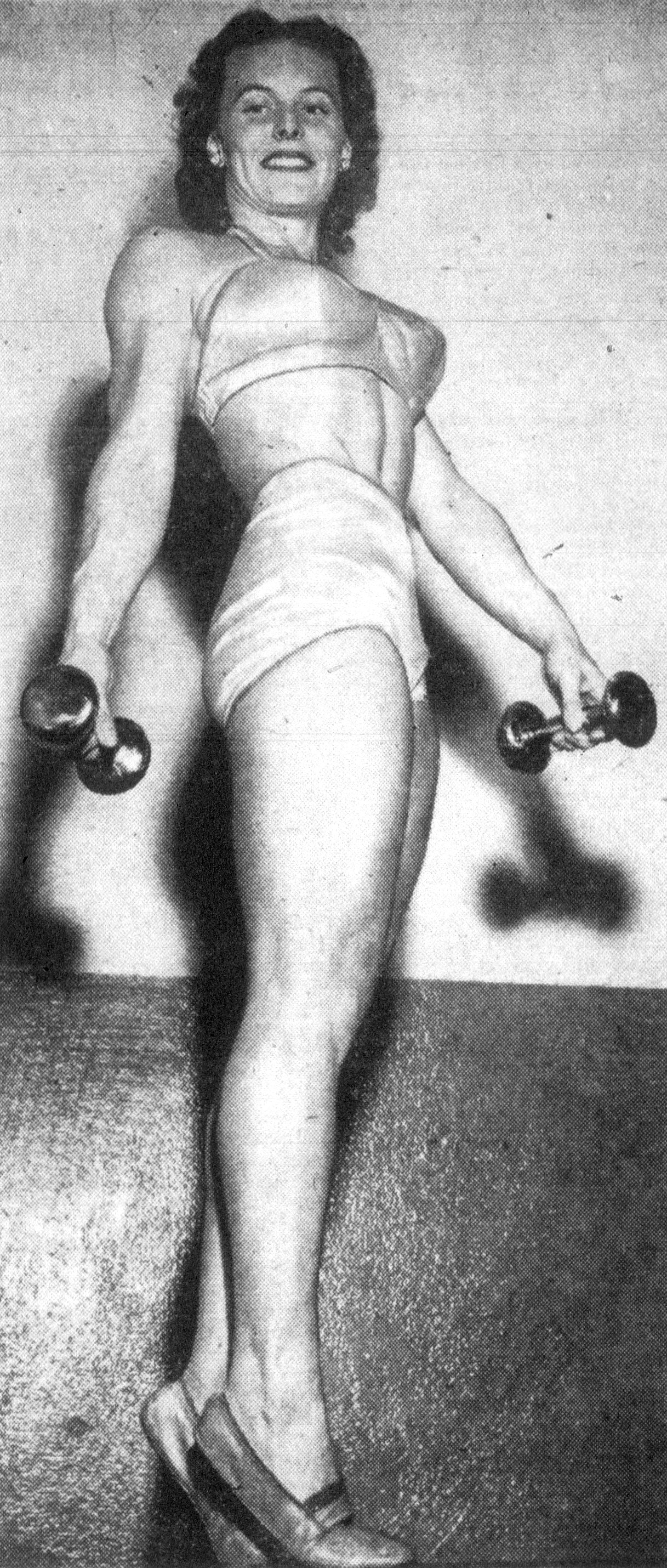
Stockton, circa 1949

Stockton and her husband were frequent visitors to Muscle Beach, where they primarily worked on acrobatics and gymnastics. One of their most famous feats involved Pudgy serving as the "understander", supporting Les (180 pounds) over her head in a hand to hand stand. Pudgy quickly became a media favorite, and was included in pictorials in Life, Pic, and Laff. She was also featured in the newsreels Whatta Build and Muscle Town USA, as well as ads for Ritamine Vitamin Company and the Universal Camera Company. She estimated that she was featured on the cover of forty-two magazines by the end of the 1940s. She posed with many of the top male bodybuilders of the time, including John Grimek and Steve Reeves.

From 1944 to 1954, Stockton wrote a regular column on women's training, "Barbelles", in Strength & Health magazine, then the most influential fitness magazine in the world.

She helped organize the first Amateur Athletic Union-sanctioned weightlifting competition for women, which was held in 1947. In that contest, Stockton pressed 100 pounds, snatched 105 pounds, and clean and jerked 135 pounds.

Physique contests for women were virtually non-existent in the 1940s, and Stockton held only one such title during her career – she was named "Miss Physical Culture Venus" in 1948. She received the Steve Reeves International Society Pioneer Award in 1998 and was inducted into the IFBB (International Fitness and Bodybuilding Federation) Hall of Fame in 2000.

Pudgy and husband Les had a daughter. Les died on April 19, 2004, at the age 87 from melanoma. Abbye died on June 26, 2006, at the age of 88 from complications due to Alzheimer's disease.

== Legacy ==
Stockton is regarded as one of the most influential figures in the history of female bodybuilding. Writing for Barbend, Brooke Siem wrote, "Abbye was the role model women from the 1940s had been thirsty for — strong, independent, successful, and feminine. In 2002 she summed up her life in two sentences that still ring true today, 'People used to say that if women worked out, they would become masculine-looking or wouldn’t be able to get pregnant. We just laughed because we knew they were wrong.'"
