= Ernestine Shepherd =

American bodybuilder (born 1936)

- Born: Ernestine Shepherd; June 16, 1936 (age 90)
- Occupation: Competitive body builder
- Years active: 1995–present
- Known for: Oldest living competitive bodybuilder at one point
- Website: ernestineshepherd.net

Ernestine Shepherd (born June 16, 1936) is an American bodybuilder who is best known for being, at one point, the oldest competitive female bodybuilder in the world, as declared by the Guinness Book of World Records in 2010 and 2011; as of 2025, she is 90 years old and still an active, albeit no longer competitive, bodybuilder.

== Life ==
Shepherd was a model in Baltimore for years, but at age 56 she and her sister Mildred Blackwell went to try on swimsuits and found their bodies were out of shape; they then started taking aerobics classes. Her sister began competing in bodybuilding shows under the name Velvet, and Ernestine followed under the name Ernie. However, her sister died in the early 1990s following a brain aneurysm. Shepherd carried on her bodybuilding career in part to remember her sister.

Shepherd published a book, Determined, Dedicated, Disciplined To Be Fit, in 2016.

She appeared briefly in Black Is King by Beyoncé.

== Record broken ==
In 2012 at age 77, Edith Connor was declared the oldest competitive female bodybuilder by the Guinness Book of World Records, beating Shepherd’s record.

== Diet and exercise ==
Her diet consists of 1,700 calories a day, mostly from boiled eggs, chicken, vegetables, and a liquid eggs drink, and she runs about 80 miles a week. She is trained by former Mr. Universe Yohnnie Shambourger.
