= IFBB Hall of Fame =

Honored bodybuilding athletes

The IFBB Hall of Fame was established in 1999 to honor outstanding athletes and officials in the sport of bodybuilding. There have been no inductees since 2011.

== Induction years ==
=== 1999 ===
- Carla Dunlap
- Cory Everson
- John Grimek
- Lee Haney
- Rachel McLish
- Sergio Oliva
- Reg Park
- Bill Pearl
- Steve Reeves
- Arnold Schwarzenegger
- Larry Scott
- Frank Zane
- Mike Mentzer

=== 2000 ===
- Chris Dickerson
- Dave Draper
- George Eiferman
- Bev Francis
- Lisa Lyon
- Clarence Ross
- Abbye "Pudgy" Stockton

=== 2001 ===
- Kay Baxter
- Albert Beckles
- Franco Columbu
- Jack Delinger
- Diana Dennis
- Kike Elomaa
- Eugen Sandow

=== 2002 ===
- Samir Bannout
- Laura Combes
- Ronald Essmaker
- Barton Horvath
- Chuck Sipes
- Mike Mentzer

=== 2003 ===
- Leroy Colbert
- Lynn Conkwright
- Lou Ferrigno
- Bert Goodrich
- Tom Platz
- Dorian Yates

=== 2004 ===
- Ed Corney
- Rich Gaspari
- Lee Labrada
- Harold Poole
- Alan Stephen
- Ellen Van Maris

=== 2005 ===
- Stacey Bentley
- Mike Christian
- Mohamed Makkawy
- Oscar State
- Armand Tanny
- Rick Wayne

=== 2006 ===
- Jules Bacon
- Sigmund Klein
- Ron Love
- Dennis Tinerino
- Claudia Wilbourn

=== 2007 ===
- Boyer Coe
- Laura Creavalle
- George Hackenschmidt
- Mike Katz
- Irvin Koszewski
- Shawn Ray
- Arthur Saxon

=== 2008 ===
- Roy Callender
- Kim Chizevsky-Nicholls
- Berry de Mey
- Don Howorth

=== 2009 ===
- Juliette Bergmann
- Kevin Levrone
- Danny Padilla
- Flex Wheeler

=== 2010 ===
- Susie Curry
- Vickie Gates
- Lenda Murray
- Ben Weider
- Joe Weider

=== 2011 ===
- John Balik
- Porter Cottrell
- Mike Francois
- Tonya Knight
- Anja Langer
- Jim Manion
- Carol Semple-Marzetta
- Saryn Muldrow
- Art Zeller
- Ronnie Coleman

=== Honored officials ===
- Oscar State
- Warren Langman
