= Cammie Lusko =

American athlete (1958–2024)

- Professional bodybuilder

Personal info
- Born: April 5, 1958; Los Angeles, California, U.S.
- Died: November 22, 2024 (aged 66); Long Beach, California, U.S.

Best statistics

Professional (Pro) career
- Pro-debut: 1979 Robby Robinson Classic; 1979
- Best win: 1979 US Women's Championship; 1979
- Active: 1980

Cammie Lusko (April 5, 1958 – November 22, 2024) was an American athlete best known for her contributions to female bodybuilding in the 1980s.

Born in Los Angeles, California, Lusko entered her first bodybuilding contest in 1979, finishing third in the Robby Robinson Classic (Roark, 2005) in her hometown. The following year, she placed 9th in the inaugural Ms. Olympia competition.

Shifting her focus to Olympic style lifting, in 1983 she became the first woman to lift more than her body weight overhead with one arm (131 lbs.). She placed second that year in the 60 kg class of the Women's National Olympic weightlifting competition (60.0 kg snatch and 82.5 kg clean and jerk for a total of 142.5 kg). At guest posings, Lusko did a strongwoman act in which she (at a bodyweight of approximately 130 pounds) pressed men weighing nearly 200 pounds overhead, and jerked a 135-pound dumbbell overhead.

== Contest history ==
- 1979 Robby Robinson Classic – 3rd
- 1979 US Women's Championship – 3rd
- 1980 IFBB Ms. Olympia – 9th
