= American Federation of Women Bodybuilders =

American sports federation

The American Federation of Women Bodybuilders was formed in 1980, started by Susan Fry, Kim Cassidy and Doris Barrilleaux. Ben Weider had asked them to start up a national organization for women bodybuilders, to provide a place where amateur women bodybuilders can be in a group. The Superior Physique Association (SPA) eventually fell by the wayside as a result of the AFWB. This AFWB was absorbed by the National Physique Committee (NPC) when it was formed, as it was illegal to have two separate amateur federations for the IFBB.
