= Laura Combes =

American bodybuilder (born 1953)

- Professional bodybuilder

Personal info
- Born: October 19, 1953; New York, New York, U.S.
- Died: October 4, 1989 (aged 35); Odessa, Florida, U.S.

Best statistics

Professional (Pro) career
- Pro-debut: 1980 Miss Virginia Beach Champion; 1979
- Best win: 1980 NPC Nationals Overall Champion; 1979–1982
- Active: Retired 1982

Laura Combes was a professional female bodybuilder from the United States.

Born on October 19, 1953, in New York, New York, Combes moved to Tampa, Florida in 1966 at age 13. As a teenager she played many sports, including fencing, sailing, archery, canoeing, horseback riding, water skiing, and tennis. Combes attended St. Petersburg College Prep School, and then went to the University of South Florida in Tampa.

In the late 1970s, she began lifting weights to rehab injuries to both knees suffered while playing rugby. Soon, she became involved in the fledgling sport of women's bodybuilding. She won the first NPC Nationals in 1980, and won the AAU Ms. America title in 1981.

Combes made a dramatic national television appearance that year on the NBC series Real People. After the airing of a taped segment about female bodybuilding in which she had been featured, Combes carried host Skip Stephenson onto stage in front of the studio audience.

Combes competed in three professional shows, retiring after a sixth-place finish at the 1982 Ms. Olympia. Combes authored Winning Women's Bodybuilding (ISBN 0-8092-5616-9) in 1983. Laura was inducted into the IFBB Hall of Fame in 2002.

Laura Combes was found dead in her apartment in Odessa, Florida on October 4, 1989, from acute alcohol poisoning.

== Contest history ==
- 1979 Ms. Brandon Physique – 4th
- 1979 Ms. Florida – 5th
- 1979 Ms. Suncoast Body Beautiful – 2nd
- 1979 IFBB Best In The World – 6th
- 1979 Ms. Tampa Physique – 1st
- 1979 Ms. West Florida – 1st
- 1979 Ms. Northwest Florida – 1st
- 1980 AAU Ms. Florida – Overall Winner
- 1980 AAU Ms. America – 1st
- 1980 NPC USA Championship – 7th
- 1980 NPC Nationals – 1st (Overall)
- 1981 Pro World Championship – 6th
- 1981 IFBB Ms. Olympia – 4th
- 1982 IFBB Ms. Olympia – 6th
