= Lisa Lyon =

American bodybuilder (1953–2023)

- Professional bodybuilder
- Lyon in 1981

Personal info
- Born: May 13, 1953; Los Angeles, California, U.S.
- Died: September 8, 2023 (aged 70); Westlake Village, California, U.S.

Best statistics

Professional (Pro) career
- Pro-debut: 1979 AAU Junior Ms. America; 1979
- Best win: 1979 AAU Junior Ms. America; 1979
- Active: 1979

Lisa Robin Lyon (May 13, 1953 – September 8, 2023) was an American female bodybuilder and photo model who is regarded as one of female bodybuilding's pioneers.

== Biography ==
Born in Los Angeles, California, on May 13, 1953, Lyon studied art at the University of California at Los Angeles. There she became accomplished in the Japanese art of fencing, kendo, but found herself lacking sufficient upper body strength so she began weight training. This eventually led her into bodybuilding.

Lyon entered and won the first International Federation of BodyBuilders Women's World Pro Bodybuilding Championship in Los Angeles on June 16, 1979. This was the only bodybuilding competition of her career. She appeared in many magazines and on television talk shows, promoting bodybuilding for women. She also wrote a book on weight training for women titled Lisa Lyon's Body Magic (ISBN 0-553-01296-7), which was published in 1981.

Her stats as taken in October 1980: bust 37A, waist 24", hips 35", height 5' 4", weight 120 lbs, hair color brunette. At the time, she could deadlift 225 pounds, bench press 120 pounds, and squat 265 pounds.

Although Lyon is often cited as the first female bodybuilder to appear in Playboy (in October 1980), she was actually predated by stripper and bodybuilder Kellie Everts, who appeared in a May 1977 pictorial called "Humping Iron".

Lyon modeled for Helmut Newton, American fine art photographer Joel-Peter Witkin, and American fine art photographer and boyfriend Robert Mapplethorpe (between 1980 and 1983, Mapplethorpe created over 150 photographs of her, resulting in the 1983 book Lady: Lisa Lyon), and Marcus Leatherdale, who published two pictures of her in his first catalogue book at the Molotov art gallery. Lyon's work with Mapplethorpe was notable owing to Mapplethorpe's depiction of her body as simultaneously traditionally feminine and strong in a conventionally masculine sense.

Lyon was inducted into the IFBB Hall of Fame in 2000 for being "... a one-woman media-relations activist on behalf of the sport... and Elevating bodybuilding to the level of fine art. "

Lyon also had a short acting career: She played

- Mathilde in Three Crowns of the Sailor, 1982;
- Pilar Jones in the bodybuilding movie Getting Physical,' 1984; and
- Cimmaron in Vamp, a low-budget 1986 film starring Grace Jones.

In creating the Marvel Comics character Elektra, Frank Miller initially used Lyon as a basis for the character's appearance.

Lisa Lyon died from stomach cancer at her home in Westlake Village, California on September 8, 2023, at the age of 70.

== Personal life ==
She was married to French singer Bernard Lavilliers from 1982 to 1983.
