= Juan Ferrero =

Spanish bodybuilder (1918–1958)

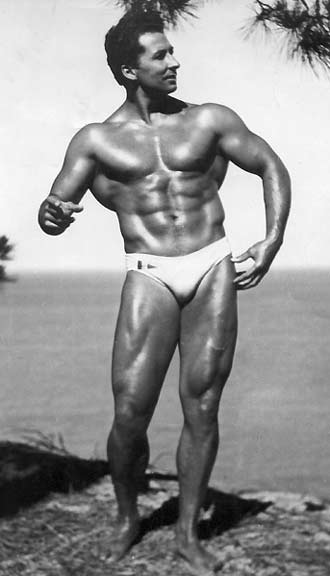
Juan Ferrero in 1952.

Juan Ferrero (5 April 1918 – 17 June 1958) was a Spanish-French bodybuilder who won the Mr. Universe Pro title in London in 1952. He was born in Spain, and although he became a resident of France at the age of seven, he always identified with his country of origin, which he proudly boasted of.

== Early life ==
Juan was born as Fidel Ferrero y Colino on 5 April 1918 in the small town of Puente Almuhey, in the province of León, Spain. His father, Alfonso Ferrero, was an employee at a local charcoal factory known as Felia San Pedro.

Ferrero and his family migrated to the city of Bordeaux, France in 1925 for political reasons. As a young child, Ferrero was weak, thin and often sick. His skin tone was very dark and tan, which contrasted with the rest of his family, to the end, he doubted his true parentage. In school, his skin earned him the monicker "El Negro" (the black). Years later, it was a big plus for his sport, but during adolescence it caused him many problems and conflicts. He also adopted the name of Juan, the name of his grandfather for whom he had a great affection.

== Bodybuilding ==
At the age of fifteen, he became interested in gymnastics and soon he got spectacular results in other sports: 11 seconds for the 100 meters, 3.15 meters (10.3 ft) in the long jump with feet together, he could also climbed the 7 meters (23 ft) smooth rope in five seconds with legs corner. Ferrero later became dedicated to bodybuilding and in 1937 won the Best Athlete competition in Europe. In weightlifting, among other brands, he broke the world record in one arm deadlift 190 kilograms (420 lb).

On the evening of 12 July 1952, at the age of 34, Ferrero won the Mister Universe Professional title that was held at the Scala Theatre in London. The award was given by the National Amateur Bodybuilders Association (NABBA), which first held its Professional category. Despite his rise to success in sports, international admiration for his triumph was not a significant impact in Spain under Franco, because Ferrero was a migrant belonging to a non-supporting family of the regime.

After he retired from competitions, he opened a prestigious gym in France called "Institut Ferrero", equipped with the most modern equipment at that time. He taught in the physical education, dance and acrobatics.

== Personal life ==
In 1939, he married fellow Spanish dancer Magdalena Isabel Martínez Cuadros in Bordeaux, with whom he had two children, Rodolfo and Anita. Rodolfo followed his father's footsteps, who at the age of 23, became the Plus Atlete de France in 1961.

Ferrero died on 17 June 1958 at the age of 40 in a car accident in Bordeaux. He was seated next to the driver of a Renault Dauphine together with four other passengers when the car went out on a curve and overturned. Ferrero was the only dead victim of the accident; the other five were unharmed, suffering only minor bruises.
