= Dennis Tinerino =

American bodybuilder (1945–2010)

- Professional bodybuilder

Personal info
- Nickname: Servinator
- Born: December 23, 1945; Brooklyn, New York, U.S.
- Died: May 7, 2010 (aged 64); Los Angeles, California, U.S.

Best statistics
- Height: 6 ft 1.5 in (1.87 m)
- Weight: Contest: 220 lb (100 kg)

Professional (Pro) career
- Best win: Mr. Universe (1968, 1975, 1980 and 1981), Mr. America (1978)

Dennis Tinerino (December 23, 1945 – May 7, 2010) was an American bodybuilder, most prominent in the late 1960s and 1970s. He won the Mr. Universe title four times in 1968, 1975, 1980 and 1981 and Mr. World in 1971 in the tall man's category, and Mr. America in 1978. After becoming involved in a life of crime, running one of the biggest escort services in California, he became an international evangelist. The 1983 edition of The Gold's Gym Book of Bodybuilding cited him as "one of the most successful bodybuilders of the past decade or two." He is an inductee of the National Fitness Hall of Fame, IFBB Hall of Fame and National Italian American Sports Hall of Fame.

== Biography ==
=== Early life ===
Tinerino was born into an Italian-American family in Brooklyn in 1945. At the age of 12 he resolved to become a champion bodybuilder and actor after looking in the mirror and feeling that he was "so skinny he could duck raindrops". His father, a boxer, started his training at the local YMCA. He grew up in a rough area, white in a black neighborhood, surviving numerous death threats, but remained focused. Attending East New York Technical High School from aged 13–16, he "packed three inches onto his arms, netting 16 inches total at a bodyweight of 175 pounds." After graduating high school he worked for Olympic Radio and TV. There he met Joe Abbenda who became his mentor, along with Bill Pearl, advancing his training sessions to 5 days a week.

=== Bodybuilding ===
Tinerino won the Teen Mr. America, Mr. Atlantic Coast, Mr East Coast, and Mr. Brooklyn contests in 1964, and finished second to Arnold Schwarzenegger at the Mr. Universe contest in 1967 at the age of 21. He won the NABBA Mr. Universe title in England in 1968, and later in 1975, 1980 and 1981 in the tall man's category. He won the Mr. World contest in the tall man's category in 1971. He finished 6th overall in the 1977 Mr. Olympia contest, 3rd in the over 200 lb category, and 9th overall in the 1978 Mr. Olympia coast, 4th in the over 200 lb category. Tinerino also won the title of Pro Mr. Natural America in 1978. His last contest was in the 1982 Mr. Olympia, finishing in 14th place.

In 1969 he portrayed Atlas in Schwarzenegger's debut film, Hercules in New York, released in February 1970. In the 1970s he appeared on the cover of magazines such as Muscle & Fitness, Muscular Development, Iron Man, and Strength & Health. The 1983 publication, The Gold's Gym book of bodybuilding, cited him as "one of the most successful bodybuilders of the past decade or two". In 1985, Robert Kennedy said of him, "this bodybuilding superstar has won every major competition except the Mr. Olympia title. To his credit, he is the only major champion to win a steroid-free contest (the Natural Mr. America).

=== Criminal turned pastor ===
Enjoying a life of excess, he was drawn into organized crime. This involved him in one of the largest escort rings in California, as well as gambling, book making and other criminal pursuits. Eventually he was arrested and prosecuted. He boasted that he earned millions and loved life in the fast lane, including making $1000 a week from arm wrestling alone. His arrest in his Hollywood office was broadcast on live TV, shamed as a former Mr. Universe turned crook. His lawyer managed to reduce his sentence to just a year in prison for pandering. In prison he met a preacher who told him that God had big plans for him and that it was his destiny to become an international evangelist. He confesses to having been "struck by a lightning bolt from heaven and have his life flash before his eyes" after praying to God to pardon his sins and becoming a Christian. On being released from prison, he established the Dennis Tinerino Ministries based in Beverly Hills in 1979, becoming an international evangelist. In 2006 he authored the book Super Size Your Faith.

== Personal life ==
Tinerino married Anita Conti in 1970. He developed cancer in the 1990s and was told he had 2 weeks to live but the cancer went into remission. He survived numerous near encounters with death, surviving a plane crash, car crashes and hitmen. He died of cancer in 2010. He is recognized in the AAU Hall of Fame, the National Italian American Sports Hall of Fame, the Oldetime Barbell & Strongmen Hall of Fame, the National Fitness Hall of Fame, and entered the IFBB Hall of Fame in 2006.
