= Miss World Bodybuilding =

International bodybuilding event

Miss World Bodybuilding is an International bodybuilding event. It is one of the most prestigious bodybuilding events of the world. It is organised by National Amateur Bodybuilders' Association. In 2017 edition, 50 contestants around the world participated among whom Indian bodybuilder Bhumika Sharma won the title.
