= John Brown (bodybuilder) =

American bodybuilder

John Brown is an American bodybuilder.

== Career ==
Brown won Amateur Mr. Universe twice (1981, 1982) in the NAABA Federation. In those years, the professional division of Mr. Universe was won by pro bodybuilders Robby Robinson in 1981, and Edward Kawak in 1982. Brown also was champion of Mr. World three times.

== Personal life ==
Brown was born and raised in Compton, California. He is the father of NFL wide receivers Equanimeous and Amon-Ra St. Brown. His middle son, Osiris St. Brown, played NCAA Division I college football as a Stanford Cardinal.
