= Hercules in the Haunted World =

1961 film by Mario Bava

- Italian film poster for Hercules in the Haunted World
- Directed by: Mario Bava
- Screenplay by: Mario Bava; Sandro Continenza; Franco Prosperi; Duccio Tessari
- Story by: Mario Bava
- Produced by: Achille Piazzi
- Starring: Reg Park; Leonora Ruffo; Christopher Lee; Giorgio Ardisson
- Cinematography: Mario Bava; Ubaldo Terzano
- Edited by: Mario Serandrei
- Music by: Armando Trovajoli
- Color process: Technicolor
- Production company: SpA Cinematografica
- Distributed by: Imperialcine; Woolner Brothers (US)
- Release date: 16 November 1961 (Italy)
- Running time: 93 minutes
- Country: Italy
- Language: Italian
- Box office: ₤398 million

Hercules in the Haunted World (Italian: Ercole al centro della terra, lit. "Hercules at the Center of the Earth") is a 1961 Italian sword-and-sandal film directed by Mario Bava. British bodybuilder Reg Park plays Hercules while British actor Christopher Lee appears as Hercules' nemesis Lico. Shooting at Cinecittà, director Mario Bava used some of the same sets from the earlier Hercules and the Conquest of Atlantis which also stars Park.

== Plot ==
Upon his return to Italy from his many adventures, the great warrior Hercules learns that his lover, Princess Deianira, has lost her senses. According to the oracle Medea (Gaia Germani), Daianara's only hope is the Stone of Forgetfulness which lies deep in the realm of Hades. Hercules, with two companions, Theseus and Telemachus, embarks on a dangerous quest for the stone, while he is unaware that Deianira's guardian, King Lico, is the one responsible for her condition and plots to murder the girl to make himself immortal. Although promising to be her guardian, Lico is in fact in league with the dark forces of the Greek underworld, and it is up to Hercules to stop him.

The climax has Hercules smashing Lico with a giant boulder and throwing similarly large rocks at an army of zombies.

== Cast ==
- Reg Park as Hercules
- Christopher Lee as King Lico
- Leonora Ruffo as Deianira
- George Ardisson as Theseus
- Marisa Belli as Aretusa
- Ida Galli as Meiazotide
- Mino Doro as Keros
- Gaia Germani as Medea
- Franco Giacobini as Telemachus
- Rosalba Neri as Helena
- Ely Drago as Giocasta

== Release ==
Hercules in the Haunted World was released in Italy on November 16, 1961. In Italy, the film grossed a total of 398 million Italian lira.

It received a theatrical release in the United States in April 1964. Christopher Lee's voice was dubbed by another actor for the English-language version of the film. Meiazotide was renamed Persephone for this version.

== Critical reception ==
In a contemporary review, The Globe and Mail referred to the film as a "particularly awful Italian movie", specifying Reg Parks' acting and the film plays "havoc with the mythology". The review also noted the English dub which was described as "corny almost beyond belief".

From retrospective reviews, the Monthly Film Bulletin stated, "Bava's film today contrives not to look too much like a cheap imitation of itself. Partly this is thanks to the resourcefulness with which the director creates a visual splendour from little except smoke and light, and partly it's the result of an almost arrogantly complex plot from which fragments of meaning seem to escape in all directions." Allmovie wrote "Hercules in the Haunted World is about as good a film as could be made on a budget in the 'mythic hero' subgenre of action films. If that sounds like faint praise, it isn't intended to be, for while overall Hercules can't totally rise above the many limitations of its genre (and budget), it nevertheless will thrill fans of such movies and even give non-devotees a number of very worthwhile elements to ponder." In his book Italian Horror Film Directors, Louis Paul described the film as "a colorful combination of the athletic muscleman peplum revival and Bava's own fascination with gothic imagery."

== Legacy ==
The film started a short-living subgenre of films trying to combine the peplum genre with horror elements. Films considered belonging to this subgenre include Riccardo Freda's The Witch's Curse and Sergio Corbucci's and Giacomo Gentilomo's Maciste contro il vampiro.

The Opera Theater Oregon commissioned composer Patrick Morganelli to write a companion piece to the film, Hercules vs. Vampires, which premiered in Portland in 2010. In April 2015 the work was staged by the Los Angeles Opera.

== See also ==
- List of films featuring Hercules
