= Roy Callender =

Barbadian Canadian bodybuilder (born 1944)

- Professional bodybuilder

Personal info
- Nickname: Barbados Bomber
- Born: October 31, 1944 (age 81); Barbados

Best statistics
- Height: 5 ft 8 in (173 cm)

Professional (Pro) career
- Pro-debut: IFBB Mr. International; 1977
- Best win: Mr. Olympia, 3rd; 1978
- Active: 1987

Roy Callender (born October 31, 1944) is a Barbadian Canadian IFBB Hall of Famer retired professional bodybuilder, professional wrestler and actor.

== Early life and career ==
Callender was born in Barbados to an academician couple. His interest in bodybuilding started by the age of 8 and after moving to England for studying law and from 1967, he began to compete, winning the title Mr Southeast Britain the same year. He became Mr. United Kingdom in 1968. After finishing second in the medium-height class in the NABBA Amateur Universe in 1967, 1969 and 1971, Callender moved to Canada where he won Mr. Canada contest. He retired from competitive bodybuilding afterwards and had a brief role in Dušan Makavejev's film Sweet Movie.

== Professional wrestling ==
Callender started his professional wrestling career in 1973. In 1974, he made his ring debut against Killer Tim Brooks in Montreal. He was promoted with the gimmick "Mr. Universe" in his career and contracted to the promotion Stampede Wrestling, Callender retired by the end of the year 1976 in a match against Keith Hart in Calgary.

== Return to bodybuilding ==
Callender contacted gym owner and photographer Jimmy Caruso to prepare him for a comeback to competitive bodybuilding and on 10 September 1977, Callender, competing for the first time since 1971, won the Canadian Championships in Calgary. He was the winner of the 1979 IFBB Pro Universe, edging out his compatriot Albert Beckles. After competing in Mr. Olympia events for four times and with varying success, he returned to Barbados in 1982. After his fifth Olympia in 1984, he had a hiatus of three years in his native country and after placing seventh at the IFBB Grand Prix in Essen, he retired in 1987.

== Later career ==
Callender returned to Montreal by 1991. He now works as a Gold's Gym master trainer.

== Competition history ==
1967

- Mr Southeast Britain, Winner
- Mr Universe - NABBA, Medium, 2nd

1968

- Mr Southeast Britain, 2nd
- Mr United Kingdom, Winner
- Universe - IFBB, 6th
- Mr World - IFBB, Medium, 2nd

1969

- Mr Universe - NABBA, Medium, 2nd

1970

- Mr World - IFBB, Medium, 2nd

1971

- Mr Universe - NABBA, Medium, 2nd

1977

- Canadian Championships - CBBF, Medium, 1st
- Canadian Championships - CBBF, Overall Winner
- Mr International - IFBB, HeavyWeight, 1st
- Universe - IFBB, MiddleWeight, 1st

1978

- Night of Champions - IFBB, 2nd
- Olympia - IFBB, HeavyWeight, 2nd
- Olympia - IFBB, 3rd
- Professional World Cup - IFBB, 3rd
- Universe - Pro - IFBB, Overall Winner

1979

- Best in the World - IFBB, Professional, 2nd
- Canada Diamond Pro Cup - IFBB, Winner
- Canada Pro Cup - IFBB, Did not place
- Florida Pro Invitational - IFBB, 6th
- Grand Prix Pennsylvania - IFBB, 2nd
- Grand Prix Vancouver - IFBB, Winner
- Olympia - IFBB, HeavyWeight, 4th
- Pittsburgh Pro Invitational - IFBB, 4th
- Universe - Pro - IFBB, Winner
- World Pro Championships - IFBB, Winner

1980

- Grand Prix Pennsylvania - IFBB, 3rd
- Night of Champions - IFBB, 3rd
- Olympia - IFBB, 7th
- Pittsburgh Pro Invitational - IFBB, 3rd

1981

- Grand Prix California - IFBB, 2nd
- Grand Prix Louisiana - IFBB, 3rd
- Grand Prix Washington - IFBB, 2nd
- Olympia - IFBB, 4th

1982

- World Pro Championships - IFBB, 5th

1984

- Olympia - IFBB, 5th

1987

- Grand Prix Germany (2) - IFBB, 7th
- Night of Champions - IFBB, Did not place
- World Pro Championships - IFBB, 12th

== Filmography ==
Year	Title	Role	Notes
1974	Sweet Movie	Jeremiah Muscle	Feature film
1980	The Comeback	Himself	Documentary
1988	Schwarzenegger: Total Rebuild	Himself	Documentary
