= Joe Abbenda =

American bodybuilder (born 1939)

- ♂ Professional bodybuilder
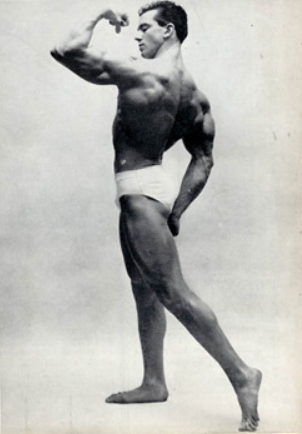

Personal info
- Born: Joseph Abbenda; July 4, 1939 (age 87); Long Island, New York, U.S.

Best statistics
- Height: 6 ft (183 cm)
- Weight: 226 lb (103 kg)

Professional (Pro) career
- Best win: Professional Mr. Universe; 1963
- Predecessor: Len Sell
- Successor: Earl Maynard
- Active: 1959-1963

Joe Abbenda (born July 4, 1939) is an American former professional bodybuilder during the early to mid-1960s. He competed in the tall man competitions, and as an amateur won the Teen Mr. America in 1959, AAU Mr. America and the amateur NABBA Mr. Universe competition in 1962, and was the professional winner a year later, in the 1963 Mr. Universe.

Abbenda was born on Long Island and raised in Queens, New York, graduating from Long Island City High School in Long Island City, Queens.

Abbenda is of Italian descent, and at the time of competing in championships, was one of only two Italian-Americans to have done so. He attended Adelphi University in 1957.

== List of competitions ==
Joseph Abbenda in Bodybuilding Competitions
Year	Competition	Result and notes
1959	Mr New York City	3rd in Tall
1959	Teen Mr America	1st
1960	Mr America	5th
1960	Mr New York City	2nd Overall, 2nd in Tall
1961	Mr America	2nd
1962	Mr America	1st Overall, 3rd in Most Muscular
1962	Junior Mr America	East Overall Winner
1962	Mr Universe	1st Overall, 1st in Tall
1963	Mr Universe Pro	1st Overall, 1st in Tall

== Media appearances ==
Joe Abbenda has been featured in magazines such as Health and Strength, IronMan, Strength and Health, and Muscular Development. He appeared as himself on the April 1, 1963 episode of To Tell the Truth, not receiving any of the four possible votes.
