= Amon-Ra St. Brown =

American-German football player (born 1999)

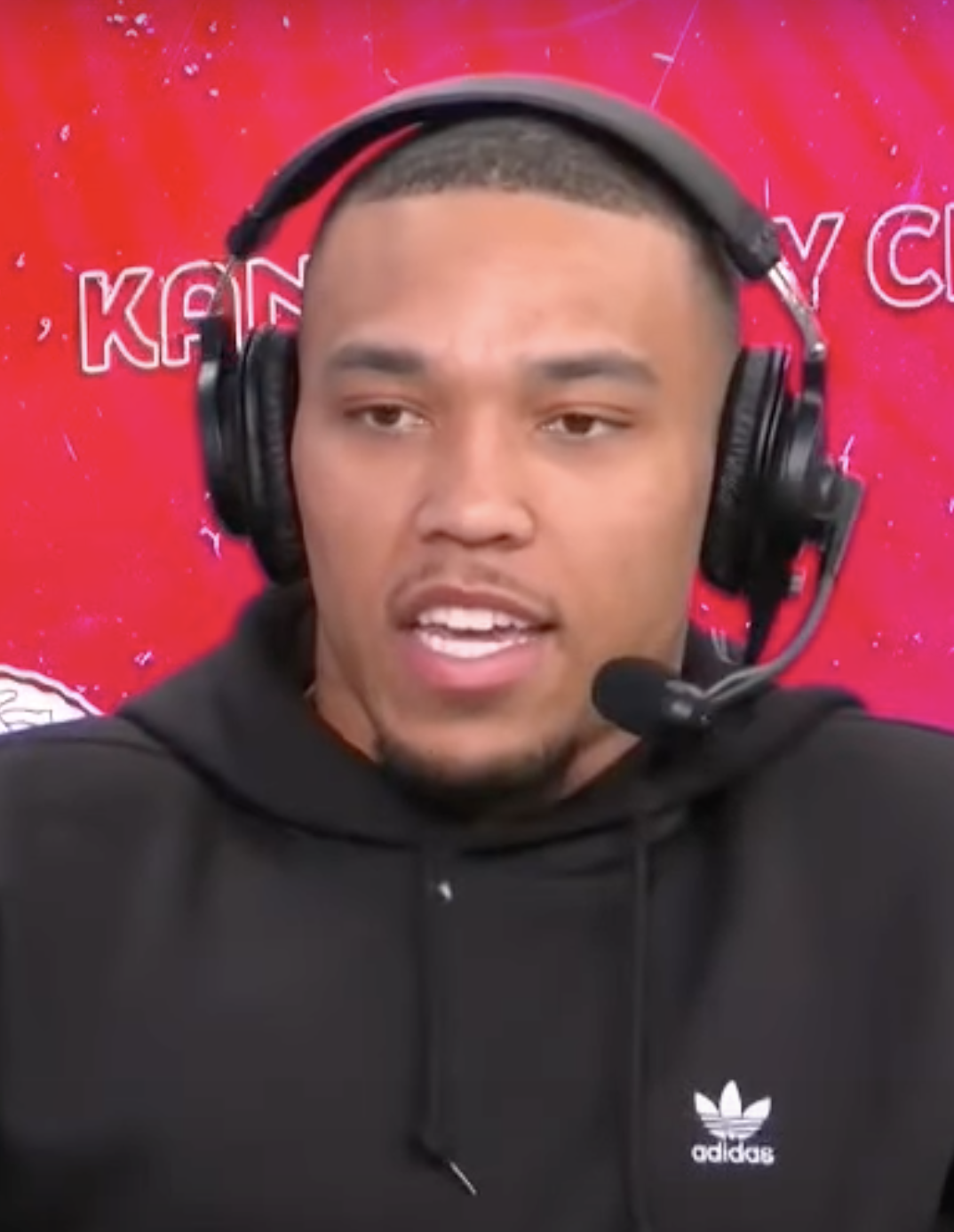
- St. Brown in 2023

No. 14 – Detroit Lions
- Position: Wide receiver
- Roster status: Active

Personal information
- Born: October 24, 1999 (age 27); Anaheim, California, U.S.
- Listed height: 6 ft 0 in (1.83 m)
- Listed weight: 202 lb (92 kg)

Career information
- High school: Mater Dei (Santa Ana, California)
- College: USC (2018–2020)
- NFL draft: 2021: 4th round, 112th overall pick

Career history
- Detroit Lions (2021–present)

Awards and highlights
- 2× First-team All-Pro (2023, 2024); Second-team All-Pro (2025); 4× Pro Bowl (2022–2025); First-team All-Pac-12 (2020); Second-team All-Pac-12 (2019)

Career NFL statistics as of Week 10, 2026
- Receptions: 612
- Receiving yards: 7,007
- Receiving touchdowns: 51
- Stats at Pro Football Reference

Amon-Ra Julian Heru John St. Brown (born October 24, 1999) is an American-German professional football wide receiver for the Detroit Lions of the National Football League (NFL). He played college football for the USC Trojans and was selected by the Lions in the fourth round of the 2021 NFL draft. St. Brown was voted to the Pro Bowl four times from 2022 to 2025, and was a first-team All-Pro in 2023 and 2024. He is the younger brother of Equanimeous St. Brown.

== Early life ==
St. Brown was born to mother Miriam (née Steyer), who is originally from Leverkusen, Germany, and father John Brown, who was a bodybuilder in the 1980s and a two-time amateur Mr. Universe. He grew up in the Anaheim Hills community of Anaheim, California and has two brothers: Equanimeous, who is currently a free agent having also played wide receiver in the National Football League (NFL); and Osiris, who played college football at Stanford. Along with his brothers, St. Brown has dual American and German citizenship. In addition to English, he also speaks German and French.

St. Brown attended Servite High School in Anaheim as a freshman before transferring to Mater Dei High School in nearby Santa Ana. As a senior in 2017, he had 72 receptions for 1,320 yards and 20 touchdowns. A five-star recruit ranked second among receiver prospects, St. Brown committed to the University of Southern California (USC) to play college football. He played with future USC teammate JT Daniels at Mater Dei.

== College career ==
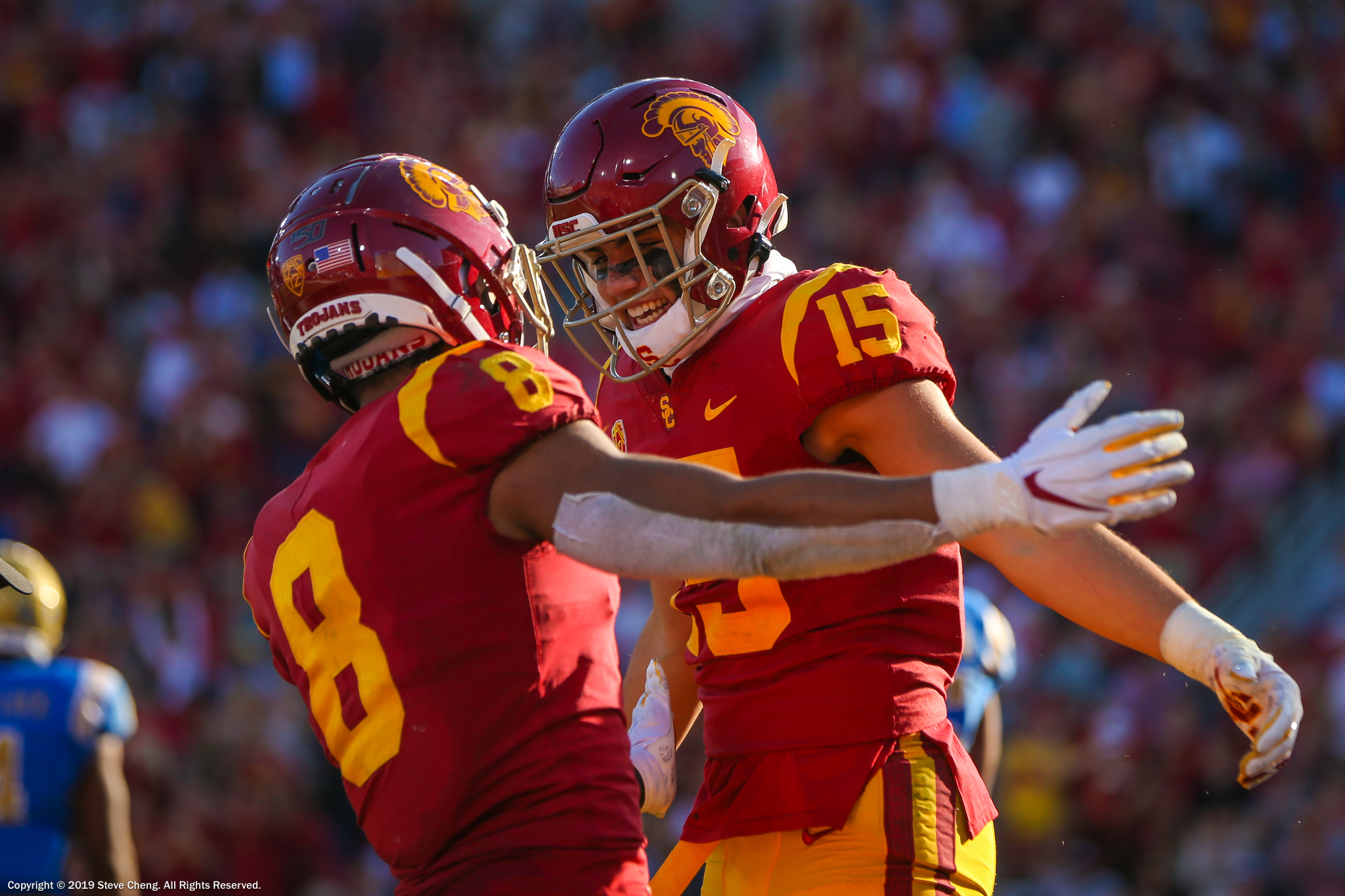
St. Brown (#8) with Drake London while at USC

In his first game of his college career, St. Brown had seven receptions for 98 yards and a touchdown in a win over UNLV. On September 15, 2018, St. Brown finished with a career-high 167 yards receiving in a game against Texas. St. Brown finished his freshman season with 60 catches, 750 yards, and three touchdowns.

On November 9, 2019, St. Brown recorded a career high 173 yards in a victory over Arizona State. Against Iowa in the Holiday Bowl, he had nine receptions for 163 yards. As a sophomore in 2019, he finished with 77 receptions for 1,042 receiving yards and six receiving touchdowns, adding seven rushes for 60 yards and another touchdown.

As a junior in 2020, St. Brown finished with 41 receptions for 478 receiving yards and seven touchdowns in six games.

== Professional career ==
=== Pre-draft ===
On January 2, 2021, St. Brown announced on his Instagram account that he would be declaring for the 2021 NFL draft, and was projected by CBS Sports as a late first-round pick. After St. Brown worked out at the NFL Combine, the NFL released its report on St. Brown by senior NFL analyst Lance Zierlein. The report placed St. Brown at a second to third round projection, and predicted he would be an average starter. Other scouting reports, including ones by Pro Football Focus and The Draft Network, placed St. Brown anywhere from a third to fourth round selection, with emphasis on him being a WR2.

Pre-draft measurables
Height	Weight	Arm length	Hand span	Wingspan	40-yard dash	10-yard split	20-yard split	20-yard shuttle	Three-cone drill	Vertical jump	Broad jump	Bench press
5 ft 11 1/2 in (1.82 m)	197 lb (89 kg)	30 3/8 in (0.77 m)	9 1/8 in (0.23 m)	6 ft 2 5/8 in (1.90 m)	4.59 s	1.63 s	2.64 s	4.26 s	6.90 s	38.5 in (0.98 m)	10 ft 7 in (3.23 m)	20 reps
All values from NFL Combine

=== 2021 season ===
St. Brown was drafted in the fourth round, 112th overall, by the Detroit Lions in the 2021 NFL Draft. He signed his four-year rookie contract with Detroit on June 17, 2021. St. Brown played his first game in Week 1 against the San Francisco 49ers, recording his first reception and finishing the game with two receptions for 23 yards. He made his first career start during Week 5 against the Minnesota Vikings, recording seven receptions for 65 yards in their 19–17 loss. St. Brown recorded his first career scoring play in a 2-point conversion attempt in their Week 6 loss of 34–11 against the Cincinnati Bengals.

The Lions entered their Week 13 matchup against the Vikings with a record of 0–10–1, in a 364-day, 15-game winless streak. With 4 seconds left in the fourth quarter, down 27–23, quarterback Jared Goff threw the game-winning touchdown pass to St. Brown, his first career receiving touchdown, clinching the Lions' first win of the season. In late December, St. Brown won the NFL Offensive Rookie of the Month award. Throughout December, he had recorded 35 receptions, 340 receiving yards, and three receiving touchdowns, all of which led the entire rookie class. In addition, he recorded 26 rushing yards.

Overall, St. Brown finished his rookie season with 90 receptions for 912 receiving yards and five receiving touchdowns, to go along with 61 rushing yards and 1 rushing touchdown. St. Brown finished fifth in yardage for the 2021 wide receiver rookie class, as well as having the most yardage for a non-first-round pick.

=== 2022 season ===
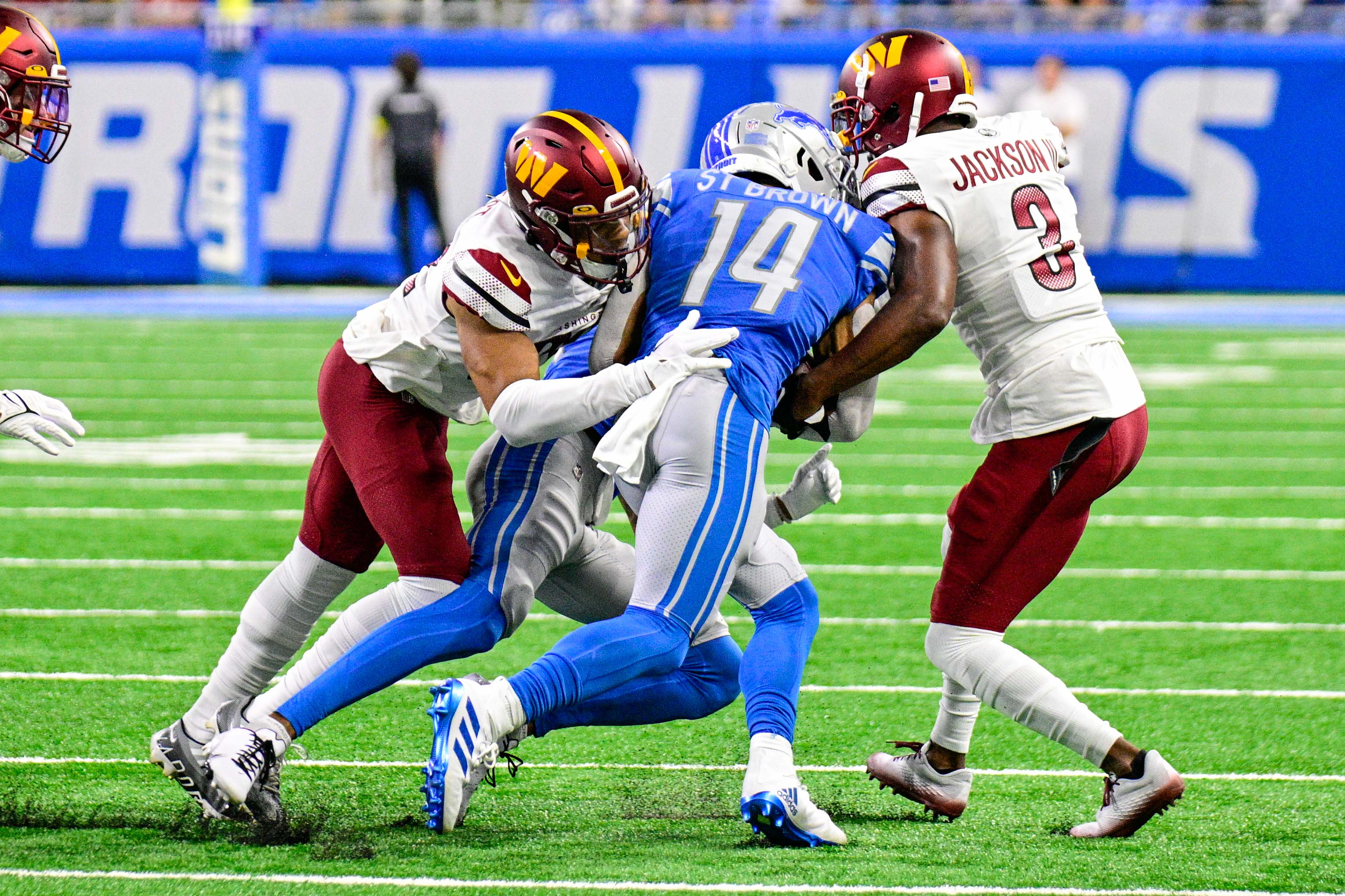
St. Brown playing against the Washington Commanders in 2022.

In their season opener against the Philadelphia Eagles, St. Brown put up an eight-reception, 64-yard performance with one receiving touchdown. Coincidentally, his touchdown came two minutes before his brother Equanimeous scored a touchdown in the Chicago Bears' season opener (this was his brother's first touchdown as a Bear). In Week 2 against the Washington Commanders, St. Brown became the first player in NFL history to have six straight regular season games with at least eight receptions and at least one touchdown, finishing the game with nine receptions for 116 yards and two touchdowns. The streak began in Week 15 of the 2021 season. St. Brown was named NFC Offensive Player of the Week for his performance. In a Week 3 matchup against division rival Vikings, his streak would end when St. Brown received 6 passes for 73 yards with no touchdowns. In the second quarter of that game, St. Brown would visit training staff with an ankle injury. This injury would cause St. Brown to miss their Week 4 matchup against the Seattle Seahawks, where the Lions would lose in a close 48–45 battle. Returning in Week 5 against the New England Patriots, St. Brown put up just 18 yards on four receptions, ending with the Lions getting shut out 29–0.

With the Lions returning from their bye week to play against the Dallas Cowboys, St. Brown went into concussion protocol after being tackled by Cowboys' cornerback Jourdan Lewis following his first reception of the game. St. Brown would not return in that game. He returned to play in Week 9 versus the Miami Dolphins. In Week 10, against the Bears, he had ten receptions for 119 yards in their 31–30 victory. In Week 12, against the Buffalo Bills, he had nine receptions for 122 receiving yards and a receiving touchdown, in their 28–25 loss. In a 40–14 victory over the Jacksonville Jaguars the following week, he had 11 receptions for 114 receiving yards and two receiving touchdowns. In a Week 15 matchup with the Carolina Panthers, St. Brown topped 1,000 receiving yards for the 2022 season, becoming the youngest receiver in Lions' franchise history to accumulate 1,000 receiving yards in a single season, beating out Calvin Johnson's record by eight days. For his efforts, St. Brown was named as a Pro Bowler. He was ranked 67th by his fellow players on the NFL Top 100 Players of 2023.

=== 2023 season ===
In Week 2, against the Seahawks, St. Brown made his first career fumble, which was recovered by the Seahawks. This was one of three turnovers committed by the team that day, resulting in a Lions loss in overtime 37–31. He started the 2023 season with injuries that caused him to miss the fourth quarter of their Week 2 game.

In Week 11 against the Los Angeles Chargers, St. Brown caught eight passes for a career-high 156 yards and a touchdown in a 41–38 win. The game also marked the fourth consecutive game in which St. Brown had more than 100 yards receiving. In Week 18 against the Vikings, St. Brown caught a 70-yard touchdown pass, the longest reception of his career.

St. Brown finished the 2023 season third in the NFL with 1,515 receiving yards (behind Tyreek Hill and CeeDee Lamb) He was selected as a First team All-Pro and earned Pro Bowl honors.

In the Wild Card Round game against the Los Angeles Rams, St. Brown had eight receptions for 110 yards in his playoff debut, including a crucial first down pass from Jared Goff in the fourth quarter that secured a 24–23 victory, the Lions' first playoff win in over 30 years. He scored a receiving touchdown in the Lions' win over the Buccaneers in the Divisional Round. He was ranked 23rd by his fellow players on the NFL Top 100 Players of 2024.

St. Brown's 2023 season is featured in the Netflix documentary series Receiver which released on July 11, 2024.

=== 2024 season ===
On April 24, 2024, St. Brown signed a four-year, $120 million contract extension, keeping him under contract with the Lions through the 2028 season. In Week 4 of the 2024 season, St. Brown threw his first career touchdown pass on a trick play to Jared Goff in a win over the Seahawks. In Week 11, against the Jaguars, he had 11 receptions for 161 yards and two touchdowns in the 52–6 victory. In a Week 15 loss to the Bills, he had 14 receptions for 193 yards and a touchdown. He finished the 2024 season with 115 receptions for 1,263 yards and 12 touchdowns. In the Divisional Round against the Washington Commanders, he had eight receptions for 137 yards in the 45–31 loss. He was named first team All-Pro for the second time. He earned Pro Bowl honors for the third consecutive season. He was ranked 20th by his fellow players on the NFL Top 100 Players of 2025.

=== 2025 season ===
In a 52–21 victory over the Chicago Bears in Week 2, St. Brown recorded nine receptions for 115 yards and three touchdowns. In Week 10, St. Brown was punched in face by Washington Commanders defensive tackle, Daron Payne. In the post-game interview, St. Brown stated the two got in a "scuffle" a few plays earlier, but admitted to no wrongdoing on his part. Afterwards video evidence was made public that revealed that St. Brown had punched Payne in the head a few plays earlier and was not ejected despite an official witnessing the strike by St. Brown. On November 15, 2025, the NFL issued him a $12,172 fine for punching Payne, which was met with criticism due to Payne being issued a one-game suspension by the league for same offense. In the following game, he had nine receptions for 149 yards and a touchdown in the 34–27 overtime win over the Giants. In Week 15, against the Rams, he had 13 receptions for 164 yards and two touchdowns in the 41–34 loss. In Week 18, against the Bears, he had 11 receptions for 139 yards in the 19–16 win. He finished the 2025 season with 117 receptions for 1,401 yards and 11 touchdowns. His 11 receiving touchdowns tied for second in the NFL. He earned Pro Bowl honors for the fourth consecutive season.

== Career statistics ==
Legend
**Bold**	Career high

=== NFL ===
==== Regular season ====
Year	Team	Games		Receiving					Rushing					Fumbles	
Year	Team	GP	GS	Rec	Yds	Avg	Lng	TD	Att	Yds	Avg	Lng	TD	Fum	Lost
2021	DET	17	9	90	912	10.1	37	5	7	61	8.7	26	**1**	0	0
2022	DET	16	16	106	1,161	11.0	49	6	**9**	**95**	**10.6**	**58**	0	0	0
2023	DET	16	16	**119**	**1,515**	**12.7**	**70**	10	4	24	6.0	11	0	1	**1**
2024	DET	17	17	115	1,263	11.0	66	**12**	2	6	3.0	10	0	1	**1**
2025	DET	17	17	117	1,401	12.0	52	11	3	9	3.0	6	0	1	0
2026	DET	9	9	65	755	11.6	56	7	2	9	4.5	10	0	**2**	0
Career		92	84	612	7,007	11.4	70	51	27	204	7.6	58	1	5	2

==== Postseason ====
Year	Team	Games		Receiving					Fumbles	
Year	Team	GP	GS	Rec	Yds	Avg	Lng	TD	Fum	Lost
2023	DET	3	3	**22**	**274**	12.5	30	**1**	0	0
2024	DET	1	1	8	137	**17.1**	**34**	0	0	0
Career		4	4	30	411	13.7	34	1	0	0

=== College ===
Season	Team	GP	Receiving				Rushing			
Season	Team	GP	Rec	Yds	Avg	TD	Att	Yds	Avg	TD
2018	USC	12	60	750	12.5	3	2	9	4.5	0
2019	USC	13	**77**	**1,042**	**13.5**	6	**7**	**60**	**8.6**	**1**
2020	USC	6	41	478	11.7	**7**	0	0	0.0	0
Career		31	178	2,270	12.8	16	9	69	7.7	1

== Awards and records ==
=== NFL awards ===
- 4× Pro Bowl selection (2022, 2023, 2024, 2025)
- NFC Offensive Player of the Week – 2022 (Week 2)
- NFL Offensive Rookie of the Month award – December 2021
- Ranked No. 67 in the NFL Top 100 Players of 2023
- Ranked No. 23 in the NFL Top 100 Players of 2024
- Ranked No. 20 in the NFL Top 100 Players of 2025
- Ranked No. 22 in the NFL Top 100 Players of 2026

=== Lions franchise records ===
- All-time rookie receiving yards: 912
- Youngest player with 1,000 yard receiving season: 23 years 61 days
- Most consecutive games with a touchdown reception: 8

== Personal life ==
=== Name ===
St. Brown's father chose his children's names from an interest in names he considered African, particularly Egyptian ones. Amon-Ra's name comes from Amun-Ra, the god of the air, of the sun, and of creation, seen as the creator of all things in Egyptian mythology; he was seen as king of the gods. Amun-Ra was also specifically worshipped as the head of the city of Thebes.

On his children's birth certificates, John Brown had his children's surnames listed as St. Brown rather than his last name because "There's too many of those guys" with the last name Brown on the back of their jerseys, as John had the expectation that his children would become athletes. John and Miriam considered Von Brown and St. Brown before John settled on the latter.

St. Brown has been in a relationship with registered nurse and model Brooklyn Adams since 2016. The couple announced their engagement on July 7, 2026.

=== Philanthropy ===
St. Brown is a community ambassador for United Health Share Ministries, a Christian healthcare non-profit organization.
