= 1978 Mr. Olympia =

Professional bodybuilding competition

The 1978 Mr. Olympia contest was an IFBB professional bodybuilding competition held in September, 1978 at Veterans Memorial Auditorium in Columbus, Ohio.

== Results ==
The total prize money awarded was $26,000.

=== Over 200lbs ===
Place	Name
1	(United States) Robby Robinson
2	(Barbados) Roy Callender
3	(Hungary) Kalman Szkalak
4	(United States) Dennis Tinerino
5	(Australia) Roger Walker

=== Under 200lbs ===
Place	Name
1	(United States) Frank Zane
2	(United States) Boyer Coe
3	(United States) Danny Padilla
4	(United States) Ed Corney
5	(United Kingdom) Tony Emmott
6	(Egypt) Mohamed Makkawy
7	(United States) Bill Grant
8	(Barbados) Albert Beckles

=== Overall winner ===
Place	Name
1	(United States) Frank Zane
2	(United States) Robby Robinson
3	(Barbados) Roy Callender
4	(United States) Boyer Coe
5	(Hungary) Kalman Szkalak
6	(United States) Danny Padilla
7	(United States) Ed Corney
8	(United Kingdom) Tony Emmott
9	(United States) Dennis Tinerino

== Notable events ==
- Frank Zane won his second consecutive Mr. Olympia title.
