= Universe Championships =

Annual worldwide bodybuilding events

The Universe Championships are annual worldwide bodybuilding events organised by the British National Amateur Body-Builders' Association (NABBA). The first competition took place on August 13, 1948. Originally promoted as the Mr. Universe contest, the event was expanded to include women's classes in 1968. Notable previous winners include bodybuilder, actor, and former governor of California Arnold Schwarzenegger, and bodybuilder and actor Steve Reeves (1926–2000). In 2025, Daniel Burke 3 times world champion won the overall title at the NABBA Mr Universe competition held in Gateshead, United Kingdom.

The Universe Championships includes the following classes:

Men	Women
Amateur Mr. Universe	Miss Universe (Trained Figure)
Junior	Ms. Universe (Athletic Figure)
Novice	Miss Universe (Toned Figure)
Masters Over 45	Professional Miss Universe (Trained)
Masters Over 55	Miss Universe (Bikini)
Sports Shorts	
Classic Bodybuilding	
Professional Mr. Universe	

== History ==
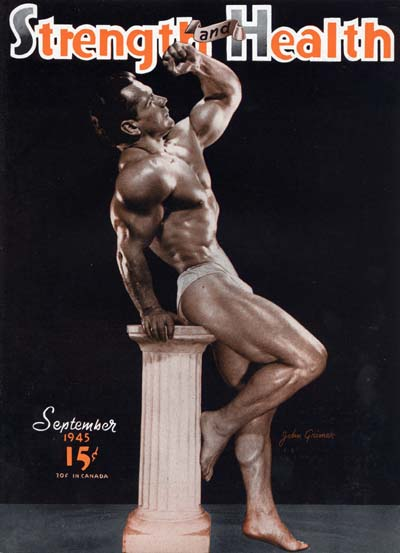
John Grimek, the first Mr. Universe, posing for the magazine organizing the event

In 1948, David Johnston, then editor of Strength and Health magazine, and his team organised the Mr. Universe contest in London to coincide with the Olympic Games. The event took place on August 13th, 1948 and drew great attention from bodybuilders and the general public who packed the Scala Theatre in London to see the spectacle. John Grimek earned the inaugural title with Steve Reeves placing second. Reeves eventually found his way to the microphone to declare, "I think that John Grimek is the greatest bodybuilder who ever lived!"

While there was no contest held in 1949, behind the scenes, members of the Strength and Health League were arranging the formation of the National Amateur Body-Builders' Association or NABBA. NABBA announced that it would be hosting the Mr Universe contest again in 1950. Steve Reeves returned to England to be crowned champion that year. Despite being the first NABBA Mr Universe, Steve Reeves was not chosen as the silhouette for the NABBA logo. That distinction would go to John Grimek and his likeness is still used to this day as the emblem of the association.

When Oscar Heidenstam became the NABBA Secretary in 1955, after a highly successful competitive career, he quickly became the main driving force of not only NABBA but also the Mr Universe contest. Around the same time, a network of area shows in the UK was established to increase membership.

In 1957, the Guadeloupan-French bodybuilder Arthur Robin became the first Black man to win the Mr Universe title.

The early success of the Mr Universe was underpinned by the support of many of the big names taking part such as John Grimek, Steve Reeves, Reg Park and Bill Pearl. Into the 1960s and 1970s the Mr Universe also became the launching pad for many of the famous bodybuilders of the day such as Arnold Schwarzenegger, Lou Ferrigno, Serge Nubret and many others. These competitors also encouraged others in America and Europe to participate in the Universe.

While the contest was initially only for amateur male bodybuilders, a professional class was added in 1952. The NABBA UK Constitution traditionally defines an amateur as someone who has "never entered and accepted prize money in an advertised professional event." Today NABBA International, the worldwide governing body, offers Pro Cards to the four male height class winners at the Universe Championships and the NABBA World Championships. Between 2011 and 2013 there was no professional Mr. Universe class held as interest had diminished. In 2013 however, following a seven-year absence from competition, Lee Priest returned and won the overall title as an amateur. Following his victory, the NABBA International Council determined that in 2014 the NABBA Professional Division would be reestablished with the inaugural professional contest being the 2014 NABBA World Championships in Belfast, Northern Ireland. In 2014, Dave Titterton won the Professional Mr Universe title in Southport, England.

Women's bodybuilding classes were included from 1968 as Ms Physique and then divided in 1986 into Ms Physique and Ms Figure. The Ms Physique class was discontinued from 2010 at the Universe Championships, however Miss Trained, Athletic, and Toned Figures are now offered.

In 1985, a Junior Mr Universe class was included for men under 21 years. The class was discontinued between 1990 and 1999 but returned in 2000.

In 1991, a Masters Over 40 class was introduced. The inaugural winner was Graeme Lancefield from Australia, narrowly beating NABBA legend John Citrone for the title. A Masters Over 50 class was introduced in 2002 with Mr Universe veteran Ian Lawrence from Scotland capturing the new award.

The NABBA Universe Championships is conducted under the auspices of NABBA UK and its chairman Jim Charles.

A separate competition called IFBB Mr. Universe was organized by the IFBB however, its name was changed to the World Amateur Bodybuilding Championships in 1976.

Mr. Universe should not be confused with Mr. Olympia, which began in 1965.

== Judging ==
The athletes are judged on their symmetry, proportions and the size and clarity of each muscle group. Most of the judging occurs during the day (this is called the pre-judging) before the evening show, the finals.

== Winners ==
Year	Mr. Universe (Professionals)	Mr. Universe (Amateur)	Miss Universe (Bikini)	Miss Physique	Miss Trained Figure	Miss Toned Figure	Miss Athletic Figure
1948		(United States) John Grimek					
1950		(United States) Steve Reeves					
1951		(England) Reg Park (India) Monotosh Roy					
1952	(France) Juan Ferrero	(Egypt) Mohamed Nasr (India) Manohar Aich					
1953	Arnold Dyson	(United States) Bill Pearl					
1954	Jim Park	(United States) Enrico Thomas					
1955	Leo Robert	(United States) Mickey Hargitay					
1956	Jack Delinger	(United States) Ray Schaeffer					
1957	(France) Arthur Robin	(England) John Lees					
1958	Reg Park	(United States) Earl Clark					
1959	Bruce Randall	(England) Len Sell					
1960	Paul Wynter	(England) Henry downs					
1961	Bill Pearl	(United States) Ray Routledge					
1962	Len Sell	(United States) Joe Abbenda					
1963	(United States) Joe Abbenda	(United States) Tom Sansome					
1964	(United States) Earl Maynard	(England) John Hewlett					
1965	Reg Park	(United States) Elmo Santiago					
1966	Paul Wynter	(United States) Chester Yorton			Elizabeth Lamb		
1967	Bill Pearl	(Austria) Arnold Schwarzenegger			Kathleen Winstanley		
1968	(Austria) Arnold Schwarzenegger	(United States) Dennis Tinerino			Silvia Hibbert		
1969	(Austria) Arnold Schwarzenegger	(United States) Boyer Coe			Jean Galston		
1970	(Austria) Arnold Schwarzenegger	(United States) Frank Zane			Christine Zane		
1971	Bill Pearl	(United States) Ken Waller			Linda Thomas		
1972	Frank Zane	(South Africa) Elias Petsas			Christine Charles		
1973	Boyer Coe	(United States) Chris Dickerson			Jean Galston		
1974	Chris Dickerson	(England) Roy Duval			Linda Cheesman		
1975	Steve Michalik	(Scotland) Ian Lawrence			Linda Cheesman		
1976	(France) Serge Nubret	(Japan) Shigeru Sugita			Cindy Breakspear		
1977	Tony Emmot	(England) Bertil Fox			Bridget Gibbons		
1978	Mike Mentzer	(United States) Dave Johns			Sandra Kong		
1979	Bertil Fox	(Turkey) Ahmet Enünlü			Karen Griffiths		
1980	Tony Pearson	(England) Bill Richardson			Erika Mes		
1981	Robby Robinson	(United States) John Brown			Jocelyn Pigeonneau		
1982	(France) Edward Kawak	(United States) John Brown			Jocelyn Pigeonneau		
1983	(France) Edward Kawak	(United States) Jeff King			Mary Scott		
1984	(France) Edward Kawak	(England) Brian Buchanan			Mary Scott		
1985	(France) Edward Kawak	(United States) Tim Belknap			Jocelyn Pigeonneau		
1986	Lance Dreher	(England) Charles Clairmonte		(West Germany) Monika Steiner	Heidi Thomas		
1987	Olev Annus	(England) Basil Francis		(United States) Connie McClosky	Sonia Walker		
1988	Charles Clairmonte	(United States) Victor Terra		(Australia) Lisa Campbell	Sarah Staunton		
1989	Charles Clairmonte	(United States) Matt Dufresne		(West Germany) Tatjana Scholl	Tracey Citrone		
1990	Charles Clairmonte	(England) Peter Reid		(East Germany) Monika Debatin	Browny OBrien		
1991	Victor Terra	(Germany) Reiner Gorbracht		(Germany) Ute Geisel	Helen Maderson		
1992	Peter Reid	(Austria) Mustafa Mohammad		(United Kingdom) Bernadette Price	Anita Lawrence		
1993	(France) Edward Kawak	(England) Dennis Francis		(Australia) Deborah Compton	Ali Slater		
1994	John Terilli	(South Africa) Nick van Beeck		(Australia) Andrea Izard	Susana Perez		
1995	Brian Buchanan	(Australia) Grant Clemesha		(United States) Cathy Butler	Susana Perez		
1996	Shaun Davis	(Hungary) Jenő Kiss		(New Zealand) Billie Kaine	Pina Theodoridis		
1997	Eddy Ellwood	(England) Grant Thomas		(Netherlands) Patricia Veldmann	Jasraj Bhadana Gujjar		
1998	Eddy Ellwood	(England) Gary Lister		(United Kingdom) Julia Abel	Pina Theodoridis		
1999	Eddy Ellwood	(Italy) Franco Malè		(Australia) Taylor Young	Giovanna Rosa		
2000	Eddy Ellwood	(Russia) Sergei Ogorodnikov		(Russia) Olga Tikhonova	Giovanna Rosa		
2001	Eddy Ellwood	(Germany) Steffen Müller		(Netherlands) Anja Timmer	Giovanna Rosa		
2002	Gary Lister	(Italy) Costantino Galeazzo		(Israel) Claudia Bianchi	Giovanna Rosa		
2003	Gary Lister	(Syria) Hassan Al Saka		(Russia) Olga Tikhonova	Cherie Loomes		
2004	Hassan Al Saka	(Scotland) Steve Sinton		(Belgium) Sandra Waterschoot	Lorena Bucci		
2005	Sergei Ogorodnikov	(Brazil) Charles Mario		(Netherlands) Desiree Dumpel	Andrea Carvalho		
2006	Steve Sinton	(Czech Republic) Tomáš Bureš		(Russia) Olga Tikhonova	Silvia Finocchi Ferreira		
2007	Orazio Salvatori	(Italy) Orazio Salvatori		(Romania) Alina Popa	Andrea Carvalho		
2008	Alessandro Savi	(France) Lionel Beyeke		(Netherlands) Vivian Hylkema	Maria Stukova		
2009	Alexey Netesanov	(Czech Republic) Martin Kasal		(Brazil) Larissa Cunha	Dora Rodrigues		
2010	Charles Mario	(Slovenia) Miha Zupan		(Ukraine) Valentyna Yefyemchuk	Flora Conte		
2011		(Brazil) Paulo Lima Santos			Maria Kuzmina	(Brazil) Maria Tereza Mendonca Pintya	
2012	(India) Sangram Chougule	(Scotland) Andy Polhill			Maria Kuzmina	(England) Nicola Bentham	
2013	(Serbia) Lepomir Bakić	(Australia) Lee Priest			Flora Conte	(England) Nicola Bentham	
2014	Dave Titterton	(England) Barny Du Plessis			Dora Rodrigues	(England) Charlotte MacGill	
2015	Tony Mount	(Northern Ireland) Paul Stewart			Daria Diossi	(England) Alex Larkin	
2016	Tony Mount	(Austria) Fabian Mayr			Emma Gormley	(United Kingdom) Amy Wilson	
2017	Shaun Joseph-Tavernier	(South Korea) Lee Seung Chul			Gemma Lancaster	(United Kingdom) Natasha Novak	Lee Tae Hee
2018	(South Korea) Lee Seung Chul	(Republic of Ireland) Loughlin Gannon			Jekaterina Übelacker	(Wales) Natalia Jaremko	Christine Scerri
2019	(United Kingdom) Josh Maley	(United Kingdom) Jack Brooker			Ilaria Armeni	(Brazil) Gabriela Dezan	(Republic of Ireland) Ana Carla Ceron
2020	These editions of the competition were not held due to COVID-19 pandemic						
2021	These editions of the competition were not held due to COVID-19 pandemic						
2022	(Czech Republic) Petr Kovář	(Austria) Daniel Glamm			(United Kingdom) Emma Thackray	(United Kingdom) Lisa Capper	(Northern Ireland) Tracy Hutchinson
2023	(Czech Republic) Petr Kovář	(Austria) Klaus Drescher			(France) Elodie Moore	(United Kingdom) Kelsey Yung	(France) Aurélie Moreau
2024	(France) Lionel Beyeke	(France) Lionel Beyeke		(United Kingdom) Ashleigh Sives Jackson			
2025	(United Kingdom) Daniel Burke	(United Kingdom) Daniel Burke					
