= Equanimeous St. Brown =

German-American football player (born 1996)

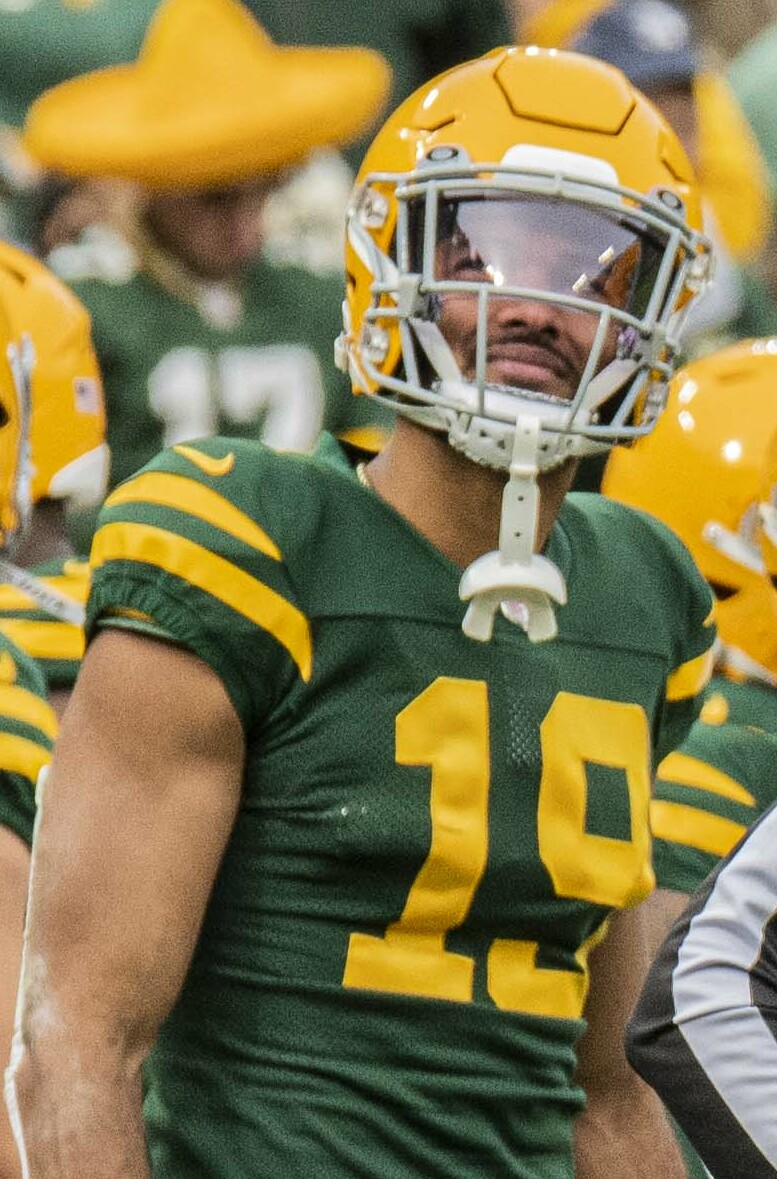
- St. Brown with the Green Bay Packers in 2021

Profile
- Position: Wide receiver

Personal information
- Born: September 30, 1996 (age 30); Placentia, California, U.S.
- Listed height: 6 ft 5 in (1.96 m)
- Listed weight: 214 lb (97 kg)

Career information
- High school: Servite (Anaheim, California)
- College: Notre Dame (2015–2017)
- NFL draft: 2018: 6th round, 207th overall pick

Career history
- Green Bay Packers (2018–2021); Chicago Bears (2022–2023); New Orleans Saints (2024); San Francisco 49ers (2025)*
- * Offseason or practice squad member only

Career NFL statistics as of 2024
- Receptions: 63
- Receiving yards: 928
- Receiving touchdowns: 2
- Stats at Pro Football Reference

Equanimeous Tristan Imhotep John St. Brown (born September 30, 1996) is a German-American professional football wide receiver. He played college football for the Notre Dame Fighting Irish and was selected by the Green Bay Packers in the sixth round of the 2018 NFL draft. He has also played for the Chicago Bears and New Orleans Saints. He is the older brother of Detroit Lions receiver Amon-Ra St. Brown.

== Early life ==
St. Brown attended Orange Lutheran High School in Orange, California, as a freshman before transferring to nearby Servite High School in Anaheim. While there, he played high school football for the Friars football team. A 4-star wide receiver recruit, he committed to Notre Dame to play college football over offers from Arizona State, California, Illinois, LSU, Northwestern, UCLA, and Utah, among others.

== College career ==
St. Brown played at Notre Dame from 2015 to 2017 under head coach Brian Kelly. After his junior season in 2017, he decided to forgo his senior year and enter the 2018 NFL draft. He finished his career with 123 receptions for 2,193 yards and 19 touchdowns.

=== College statistics ===
Season	Team	Class	Pos	GP	Receiving			
Season	Team	Class	Pos	GP	Rec	Yds	Avg	TD
2015	Notre Dame	FR	WR	7	1	8	8.0	0
2016	Notre Dame	SO	WR	12	58	961	16.6	9
2017	Notre Dame	JR	WR	13	33	515	15.6	4
Career				32	92	1,484	16.1	13

== Professional career ==
Pre-draft measurables
Height	Weight	Arm length	Hand span	Wingspan	40-yard dash	10-yard split	20-yard split	Vertical jump	Bench press
6 ft 4 3/4 in (1.95 m)	214 lb (97 kg)	33 in (0.84 m)	9 3/4 in (0.25 m)	6 ft 6 7/8 in (2.00 m)	4.48 s	1.54 s	2.59 s	34.5 in (0.88 m)	20 reps
All values from NFL Combine/Pro Day

=== Green Bay Packers ===
St. Brown was selected by the Green Bay Packers in the sixth round with the 207th overall pick in the 2018 NFL draft. He signed his rookie contract on May 7, 2018. St. Brown made his NFL debut in Week 1 against the Chicago Bears on special teams. In a Week 5 loss to the Detroit Lions, St. Brown recorded his first three professional catches, which went for 89 yards, including a 54-yard catch-and-run near the end of the game. On October 15 against the San Francisco 49ers on Monday Night Football, with 15 seconds left in the game, he recorded a key 19-yard catch that helped set up a game-winning field goal by Mason Crosby. St. Brown finished his rookie season with 21 receptions for 328 yards in 12 games and seven starts.

During a preseason game against the Oakland Raiders on August 22, 2019, St. Brown suffered a serious ankle injury, later reported to be a severe high ankle sprain. The Packers placed him on injured reserve on August 31, ending his 2019 season before it began.

On September 19, 2020, St. Brown was placed on injured reserve. He was activated on October 17, 2020. On December 27, 2020, St. Brown caught his first NFL touchdown, a 21-yard reception from Aaron Rodgers, during a 40–14 Week 16 victory over the Tennessee Titans on Sunday Night Football. In the 2020 season, St. Brown appeared in 12 games and started one. He finished with seven receptions for 117 yards and a touchdown.

On August 31, 2021, the Packers waived St. Brown as part of their final roster cuts but was signed to the practice squad the next day. On September 21, 2021, St. Brown was elevated to the active roster and sent back to the practice squad the next day. On October 3, 2021, St. Brown was once again elevated to the active roster and sent back to the practice squad two days later. On October 9, 2021, St. Brown was elevated to the active roster, and then reverted to practice squad again. Four days later the Packers signed him to the active roster. In the 2021 season, St. Brown appeared in 13 games and started two. He had nine receptions for 98 receiving yards.

=== Chicago Bears ===
On March 18, 2022, St. Brown signed a one-year contract with the Bears. In the season opener against the 49ers, St. Brown scored a touchdown on an 18-yard pass from Justin Fields. Coincidentally, his touchdown came two minutes after his brother, Amon-Ra, scored a touchdown in the Detroit Lions' opener. He finished the 2022 season with 21 catches for 323 receiving yards and one receiving touchdown in 16 games and starts.

On January 4, 2023, St. Brown signed a one-year, $1.25 million contract extension with the Bears. In Week 4 against the Denver Broncos, he made his season debut in place of benched Chase Claypool. He was placed on injured reserve on October 13, 2023, with a hamstring injury. He was activated on November 9.

=== New Orleans Saints ===
On April 12, 2024, St. Brown signed with the New Orleans Saints. He was released on August 27, and re-signed to the practice squad.

=== San Francisco 49ers ===
On July 22, 2025, St. Brown signed with the San Francisco 49ers. On July 31, he was released by 49ers. St. Brown was re-signed by the 49ers on August 5, following the release of Andy Isabella. On August 8, he was placed on the season-ending injured reserve list. On August 19, St. Brown was released by the 49ers with an injury settlement.

== NFL career statistics ==
=== Regular season ===
Year	Team	Games		Receiving					Fumbles	
Year	Team	GP	GS	Rec	Yds	Avg	Lng	TD	Fum	Lost
2018	GB	12	7	21	328	15.6	54	0	0	0
2019	GB	0	0	Did not play due to injury						
2020	GB	12	1	7	117	16.7	24	1	0	0
2021	GB	13	2	9	98	10.9	26	0	0	0
2022	CHI	16	16	21	323	15.4	56	1	1	0
2023	CHI	7	2	5	62	12.4	21	0	0	0
2024	NO	2	0	0	0	0.0	0	0	0	0
Total		62	28	63	928	14.7	56	2	1	0

=== Postseason ===
Year	Team	Games		Receiving					Fumbles	
Year	Team	GP	GS	Rec	Yds	Avg	Lng	TD	Fum	Lost
2019	GB	0	Did not play due to injury							
2020	GB	2	0	2	37	18.5	27	0	0	0
2021	GB	1	1	0	0	0	0	0	0	0
Total		3	1	2	37	18.5	27	0	0	0

== Personal life ==
St. Brown speaks fluent French and German in addition to his native English. He used all three languages when he announced his commitment to play football at Notre Dame in 2015.

He has two younger brothers, Osiris and Amon-Ra; both are wide receivers. The three brothers' last names are "St. Brown", while their parents' last name is "Brown". Osiris played for the Stanford Cardinal and was previously a four-star recruit coming out of Mater Dei High School in California, while Amon-Ra played for USC before being drafted by the Detroit Lions in the 2021 NFL draft. Their father, John, is a former Mr. Universe. St. Brown's mother, Miriam Brown (née Steyer), is from Leverkusen, Germany. He and his brothers are all dual citizens, holding American and German citizenship, and spent much of their youth traveling abroad, including a period studying at an elementary school in France.

On his children's birth certificates, John Brown had his children's surnames listed as "St. Brown" rather than his last name because "There's too many of those guys" with the last name "Brown" on the back of their jerseys, as John thought his children stood a good chance of becoming professional athletes. John and Miriam debated between "Von Brown" and "St. Brown" before John settled on the latter.
