= Ahmet Enünlü =

Turkish bodybuilder

Medal record

Bodybuilding

World Amateur Championships-IFBB
Silver medal – second place	2000 Malacca, MAL	Masters 50+
Silver medal – second place	1989 Paris, FRA	Lightheavyweight
Gold medal – first place	1982 Bruges, BEL	Lightheavyweight
Bronze medal – third place	1976 Montreal, CAN	Middleweight

World Championships-WABBA
Gold medal – first place	1978	Medium class
Gold medal – first place	1977	Medium class

Universe Championships-NABBA
Gold medal – first place	1979 London, UK	Medium class
Silver medal – second place	1977	Medium class
Gold medal – first place	1974 Verona, ITA	Medium class
Silver medal – second place	1973 Geneva, SUI	Medium class
Silver medal – second place	1971 Paris, FRA	Medium class
Gold medal – first place	1970 Belgrade, YUG	Medium class

European Championships-IFFB
Silver medal – second place	1973	Medium class
Silver medal – second place	1969	Medium class

Ahmet Enünlü (born July 3, 1948) is a world champion Turkish bodybuilder.

Enünlü was the fore-runner and the most successful performer of this sport in Turkey. He became the WABBA overall world champion in 1977 and 1978. In 1979, he won the overall Mr. Universe title of the National Amateur Body-Builders' Association (NABBA).

Enünlü is the grandson of Abdullah Cevdet, an Ottoman-era intellectual of Kurdish descent.

== Magazine covers ==
- 1979 Vol 108, Num 1 Health and Strength
- 1979 Vol 108, Num 8 Health and Strength
- 1979 July Vol 47, Num 4 Strength and Health
- 1979 August Num 78 Muscle Training Illustrated
- 1980 June Num 84 Muscle Training Illustrated
