= Reg Park =

British bodybuilder and actor (1928–2007)

- Professional bodybuilder

Personal info
- Nickname: Reg Park "The Legend" or Reg the Leg (Note: In this instance of a rhyming nickname, "Leg" is pronounced as it would be in "Legend".)
- Born: 7 June 1928; Leeds, England
- Died: 22 November 2007 (aged 79); Johannesburg, South Africa

Best statistics
- Height: 6 ft 1 in (1.85 m)
- Weight: 220 lb (100 kg)

Professional (Pro) career
- Pro-debut: Mr Britain, 4th; 1946
- Best win: Mr Universe; 1951, 1958, 1965
- Predecessor: Steve Reeves
- Successor: Paul Wynter

Roy "Reg" Park (7 June 1928 – 22 November 2007) was an English bodybuilder, businessman, and actor. His first title was Mr. Britain in 1949. He then won Mr. Universe in 1951, 1958, and 1965. He went on to star in five films. Later in life, he received renewed interest for being the first inspiration (and later a mentor) to Arnold Schwarzenegger.

== Early life ==
Park was born in Leeds on 7 June 1928. Showing athletic interests early in life, he dedicated his teenage years to excelling in football, where he played in the reserves for Leeds United FC. He had no specific interest in bodybuilding until age 16, when he met David Cohen. Upon learning that Cohen lifted weights at a friend's house, Park joined in out of curiosity; his resulting legendary physique would soon begin to grow from barbells, dumbbells, and a simple chinning bar. During his national service, Park worked as a Physical Training Instructor in Singapore. Upon his discharge from the British Army in 1948, he witnessed his first physique contest, the inaugural NABBA Mr. Universe contest in London. The competition saw John Grimek beating Steve Reeves in controversial fashion, and it was this contest that inspired Park to compete.

== Career ==
After one year of training, Park earned the title of Mr. Britain in 1949. He then spent six months in the United States after his parents paid his expenses as a gift. There, he met up with publisher Joe Weider, who began to feature him prominently in his popular muscle magazines. The next year, Park was runner-up to Reeves in the 1950 NABBA Amateur Mr. Universe in London, which was also a close contest.

After a second full year of training, Park broke what had been an American monopoly on bodybuilding titles by winning the 1951 National Amateur Bodybuilders Association (NABBA) Amateur Mr. Universe. He cemented his status by winning the 1958 and 1965 NABBA Pro Mr. Universe titles. Standing 6 ft 1 in and with a top weight of 250 lb, he was known for his mass and was a forerunner to the size-focused aspects that dominate modern bodybuilding. He was also renowned for his strength, which he often demonstrated in contests and strongman exhibitions. He is on record as the second man (after Doug Hepburn) to bench press 500 lb. As an actor, he made five films, all of which were Italian sword and sandal pictures featuring him as Hercules, Maciste and Ursus.

Park was an early influence and lifelong mentor to Austrian bodybuilder Arnold Schwarzenegger, who said that he was first inspired to lift weights after seeing Park playing Hercules. For three years in the 1960s, Schwarzenegger was trained by Wag Bennett at Bennett's gym in Forest Gate, where he had the chance to meet Park and be mentored by him. Bonus footage from the DVD release of the documentary Pumping Iron (1977) features Park mentoring Schwarzenegger. Park can also be heard performing MC duties in the Mr. Universe and Mr. Olympia contests featured in the film.

Park moved to South Africa at an unknown date; up to the time of his fatal illness in 2007, at the age of 79, he continued to train clients at the Morningside Virgin Active Gym in Sandton. He has been featured in many fitness and bodybuilding magazines, and has also appeared on the cover of Muscle & Fitness. He was inducted into the International Federation of Bodybuilders (IFBB) IFBB Hall of Fame's first ballot in 1999.

== Death ==
Eight months after being diagnosed with skin cancer that soon spread to the rest of his body, Park died on 22 November 2007 at his home in Johannesburg at the age of 79. His wife of 55 years, Mareon, and their two children Jeunesse and Jon Jon were by his side. His son Jon Jon, who was trained by Park, also became a personal trainer and is a former Olympic swimmer. Today, Jon Jon is the owner of the popular Legacy Gym in West Los Angeles. Park's daughter Jeunesse founded the non-profit organisation Food & Trees for Africa.

== Bodybuilding titles ==
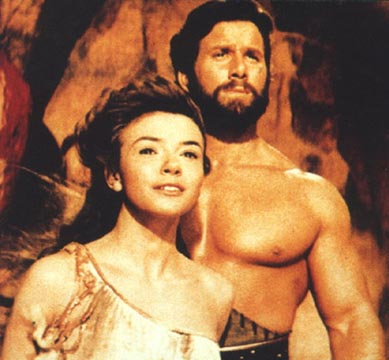
Park with Laura Efrikian in Hercules and the Conquest of Atlantis

- 1946 Mr Britain 4th
- 1949 Mr Britain 1st
- 1950 Mr Europe 1st
- 1950 Best Developed Athlete in America - IFBB, Tall, 1st
- 1950 Best Developed Athlete in America - IFBB, Overall Winner Mr Europe
- 1950 Overall Winner Mr Universe - NABBA, Tall, 2nd
- 1951 Mr Universe - NABBA, Tall, 1st
- 1951 Mr Universe - NABBA, Overall Winner
- 1958 Mr Universe - Pro - NABBA, Tall, 1st
- 1958 Mr Universe - Pro - NABBA, Overall Winner
- 1965 Mr Universe - Pro - NABBA, Tall, 1st
- 1965 Mr Universe - Pro - NABBA, Overall Winner
- 1969 Mr Africa 1st
- 1970 Mr Universe - Pro - NABBA, Tall, 2nd
- 1971 Mr Universe - Pro - NABBA, Tall, 3rd
- 1973 Mr Universe - Pro - NABBA, Tall, 2nd

=== Competitive stats ===
- Height: 6 ft 1 in (185 cm)
- Contest weight: 214–222 lb (97–101 kg)
- Off-season weight: 225–250 lb (102–113 kg)
- Arms: 18.5 @ 215 lbs, 19.0 @ 230 lbs" (47–48 cm)

== Filmography ==
- Ercole Alla Conquista Di Atlantide (1961) Italy. aka Hercules Conquers Atlantis (1962 UK title) Hercules and the Captive Women (1963 US title)
- Ercole Al Centro Della Terra (1961) Italy. aka Hercules in the Centre of the Earth (1962 UK title) and Hercules in the Haunted World (1963 US title) co-starring Christopher Lee
- Maciste Nelle Miniere Di Re Salomone (1964) Italy. aka Maciste in King Solomon's Mines (1964)
- Ursus, Il Terrore Dei Kirghisi (1964). Italy. aka Hercules, Prisoner of Evil (1964)
- Sfida Dei Giganti (1965) Italy. aka Hercules the Avenger (1965)

== See also ==
- List of male professional bodybuilders
