= Mohamed Nasr =

Egyptian bodybuilder

Mohamed Nasr is an Egyptian bodybuilder. He was the overall winner of 1952 NABBA Mr. Universe championship.
