= John Terilli =

Former Australian professional bodybuilder

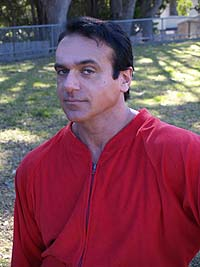
John Terilli

John Terilli is an Australian former professional bodybuilder.

== Background ==
Terilli was born in Italy and he moved with his family to Sydney, Australia, when he was eight years old. For most of his pre-teen life he was an over-weight child. In an effort to change himself he developed anorexia nervosa and bulimia nervosa at the age of only 11. However, he managed to turn this around when he was 12 years old and started following a more sensible nutrition and exercise program, developed mainly from his own observations and experimentation.

== Bodybuilding career ==
=== Beginnings ===
He began bodybuilding after first seeing his lifelong inspiration Arnold Schwarzenegger on the cover of a magazine. He started his amateur career at home by lifting bricks tied to each end of a broomstick handle.

By 1976, Terilli had developed an impressive physique mainly through calisthenics with very little actual weight training in a gymnasium. In that year he entered his first bodybuilding competition, the Teen Mr. New South Wales, which he won. Due to his success in the teen competition, and the caliber of his physique, he was encouraged to enter the overall Mr. New South Wales competition, which was being held later that day. He won in that category as well, becoming the youngest person ever to do so (a feat which has yet to be equalled or bettered).

Seeing a future in bodybuilding, John began competing in other Australian contests which culminated in him winning the best in Australia in 1980 - on the same night, and the same stage, as his inspiration Arnold Schwarzenegger who won the 1980 Mr Olympia at the Sydney Opera House. In 1982, he won the Mr. Australasia title and the 1982 Amateur Mr. Universe title. In 1983, following his Mr. Universe win he decided to turn professional.

=== Turning pro' ===
He went on to place fifth in the 1983 New York Night of Champions, which was quite an achievement for a relatively unknown bodybuilder competing in a contest of that calibre. He also placed second to Lee Haney in the 1983 Caesar's Palace Pro World Cup, losing by only one point. The general consensus, amongst the audience attending the event, was that Terilli had won.

In 1985, Terilli moved to the United States and in 1986 he qualified for Mr Olympia at the 1986 Professional World Bodybuilding Championships (now dubbed The Arnold Schwarzenegger Classic). He also succeeded in becoming a finalist in the 1986 Mr Olympia competition.

=== Experimentation ===
Thereafter, John shifted his focus to experimentation with dieting, nutrition and training protocols. He was able to gain access to the St Luke's Roosevelt Woman's Hospital Obesity Centre in New York, where he worked with a team of medical practitioners to study the effects of food on body composition and body fat levels, as well as ways to accurately measure body fat. He developed a keen sense of the way you should eat to maintain body fat levels and body composition. In 1989 John returned to Australia and kept working in this field and as a personal trainer until he opened gymnasiums in the Sydney Area in 1992. In Australia, he is now seen as a leading expert in gender specific biochemical effects on the endocrine and adrenal systems when dieting.

John continued to compete in various professional bodybuilding contests and in 1993 he placed second in the Professional Mr. Universe. In 1994 he became the only (as of 2006), Australian male to win the Professional Mr. Universe Title Terilli retired from participation in bodybuilding competitions in 1994.

== Married Life – Post Competitions ==
John married in 1990 to Angela Terilli and they had their first child in 1991 and their second in 1995.

His passion for the media, and in particular film making, has led to numerous small roles in feature films, short films and television commercials. He has also been the cover model for numerous health and fitness publications internationally throughout his career. He is currently the co-producer, host and researcher of BodyRenovator, a monthly weight loss, health and fitness DVD series.

John's personal motto is "eat more and exercise less".

"Terilli was the best bodybuilder Australia had ever produced and none have proven otherwise since." – Rocco Oppedisano (Reps Bodybuilding Australia, 1991, page 14).
