= Henry Downs (bodybuilder) =

British bodybuilder (1931–2024)

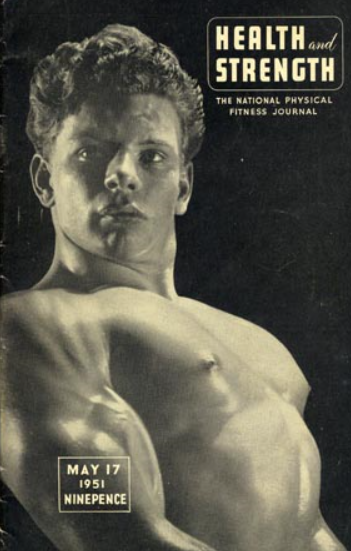
Henry Downs

Henry Sidney Downs (5 October 1931 – 5 August 2024) was a British amateur bodybuilder who was active during the 1950s and 1960s. He won the Mr. Universe title in 1960. Born in Gorey, Jersey on 5 October 1931, Downs later moved to London, where he worked as a labourer. He later lived in Stevenage, Hertfordshire, and died on 5 August 2024, at the age of 92.
