= Linda Cheesman =

American bodybuilder

Linda Cheesman is an American former fitness and figure competitor and female bodybuilder. She won the Miss Physique competition at the Universe Championships in 1974 and 1975. In 1975 she won the Miss Bikini Universe, and finished 2nd in 1978 to Sandra Kong. She twice appeared on the cover of Health and Strength magazine, first in 1975 with Boyer Coe and Ian Lawrence, and in 1977 with Jacques Neuville.
