= Shaun Davis =

British bodybuilder (1966–2023)

Shaun Davis (15 April 1966 – November/December 2023) was a British bodybuilder who was Mr. Universe in 1996. He was also Mr. UK, Mr. Britain, Mr. Europe and Mr. Pro Universe. His career ended after kidney failure and a transplant and he campaigned for others to sign up to the organ donor campaigns. He was father to daughter Harley.

On 1 December 2023, it was announced that Davis had died at the age of 57.
