= John Lees (bodybuilder) =

English bodybuilder (1930–2021)

- professional bodybuilder
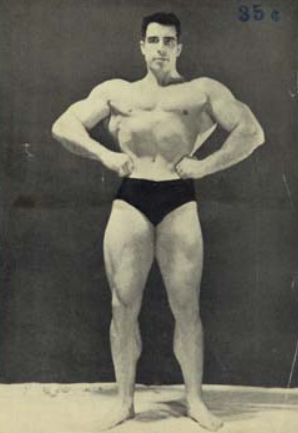

Personal info
- Born: 17 January 1930; Stalybridge, Greater Manchester, England
- Died: 14 November 2021 (aged 91)

Best statistics
- Height: 6 ft 1 in (1.85 m)
- Weight: 231 lb (105 kg / 16.5 st)

Professional (Pro) career
- Pro-debut: Mr Britain; 1949
- Best win: Mr. Britain (1953) Mr. Universe (1957)

John Lees (17 January 1930 – 14 November 2021) was an English bodybuilder and later a professional wrestler who won Mr. Universe in 1957.

== Early life and career ==
Lees was born in the Castle Hall district of Stalybridge in Greater Manchester, to John and Elsie Lees. At age 14, Lees left St Peter's RC School and began working for his father's building firm. He attended night school during which he studied joinery and bricklaying.

While in his early teens, Lees began bodybuilding. His early method of training entailed lifting bags of cement in each hand during work. He also trained with the East Cheshire Harriers athletic club.

Lees continued his interest in health and fitness during his National service in the British Army as a Physical training instructor (PTI), during his time spent in Germany.

== Professional bodybuilding career ==
Lees debuted in bodybuilding shows in 1949, placing 3rd at Mr. Britain. Four years later, he won the 1953 Mr. Britain. He pursued the Mr. Universe title for four years, finishing in the top three before finally winning the title in 1957. He received the winners' trophy from movie legend Errol Flynn.

== Professional wrestling career ==
Two years after his 1957 Mr. Universe victory, Lees began his wrestling career. Nicknamed "Big", Lees debuted on 22 July 1959 in Regensburg, Bavaria, Germany, wrestling German wrestler James Brown to a draw. From July 1959 to October 1959, Lees wrestled all 59 of his matches for the German promotion Internationaler Berufsringkämpfer-Verband (IBV) (English translation: International Professional Wrestlers Federation), and enjoyed a successful string of victories, despite no wrestling titles being involved. In his final IBV match held on 14 October 1959, Lees defeated Franz Orlik. From 1959 to 1970, Lees travelled the world, wrestling in Germany, England, France, Japan and Austria.

Between April and May 1968, while in Japan, Lees worked for the Tokyo-based International Wrestling Enterprise promotion as part of a 14-night national tour. On 17 April, during the sixth night of the tour, Lees along with Welsh wrestler "Checkmate" Tony Charles challenged reigning champions Thunder Sugiyama and Toyonobori for the TWWA Tag Team titles in a Best Two Out Of Three Falls match, but lost after eighteen minutes. On 8 May, during the twelfth night of the tour, Lees teamed with fellow Manchester wrestler Bill Robinson to challenge once again for the TWWA Tag Team Titles held by Thunder Sugiyama and Toyonobori, but were unsuccessful in securing the Best Two Out of Three Falls victory. On 11 May, Lees wrestled his former tag teammate Bill Robinson in a Best Two Out of Three Falls match for the European Heavyweight title but did not win. He finished the tour on 12 May, teaming with Colin Joynson in a losing effort against Thunder Sugiyama and Toyonobori in a non-title tag team match.

Lees was featured in an article published in Northern News related an interview with Lees in which he addressed competing with a severely injured elbow as well as the physical demands of the business. In the same article, a pair of photographs show Lees in the ring against an opponent described as an Austrian strongman named Felix Kerschitz. Northern News apparently shared these photographs as well as the match result originally reported by another publication called the Scots Corner, indicating Lees scored a victory against Kerschitz by knockout. No date was given as to when this match occurred.

With a total of 224 matches, Lees wrestled his final match on 13 August 1970, winning a victory over Hektor van Mullen.

== Retirement ==
In retirement, Lees operated a gym called John Lees Fitness Centre in Stalybridge, until it was destroyed by a fire in 2005. He died on 14 November 2021, at the age of 91. He is survived by a daughter named Tina and two grandchildren.

== Competitive history ==
Lees participated in the following bodybuilding competitions:

- 1949: Mr Britain - HSL, 3rd
- 1950: Mr Britain - HSL, 3rd
- 1950: Mr Universe - NABBA, Medium-Tall, 1st
- 1952: Mr Universe - NABBA, Tall, 2nd
- 1953: Mr Britain - HSL, Winner
- 1953: Mr Europe - 4th
- 1953: Mr Universe - NABBA, Tall, 2nd
- 1954: Mr Universe - NABBA, Tall, 2nd
- 1955: Mr Universe - NABBA, Tall, 3rd
- 1956: Mr Universe - NABBA, Tall, 2nd
- 1957: Mr Universe - NABBA, Tall, 1st
- 1957: Mr Universe - NABBA, Overall Winner
