= Bruce Randall =

American bodybuilder (1931–2010)

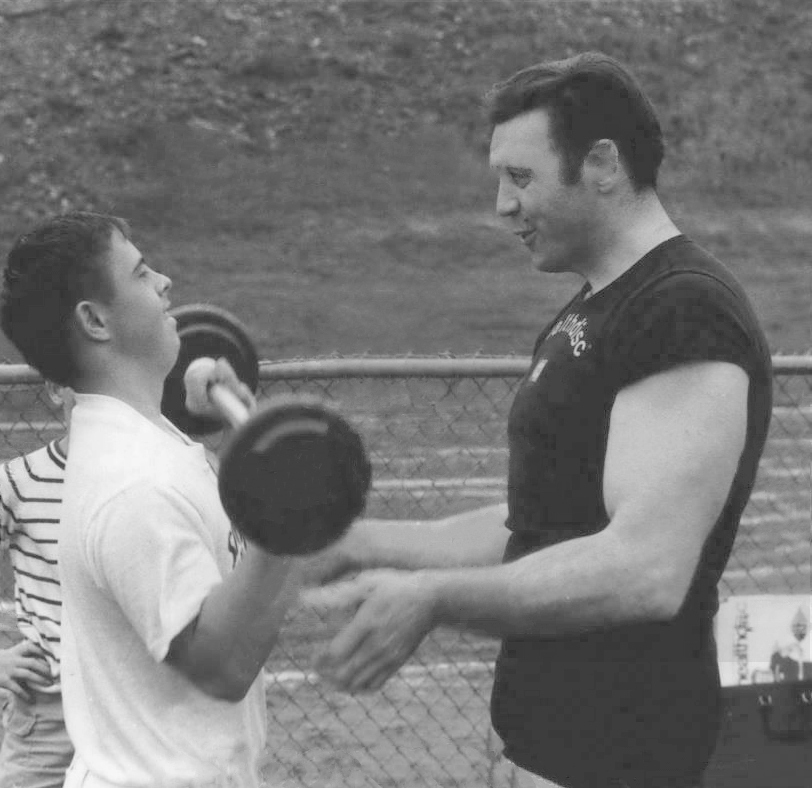
Randall (right) at the Special Olympics in 1970

Bruce Emerson Randall (August 17, 1931 – August 23, 2010) was an American professional bodybuilder who competed in the late 1950s.

== Life and career ==
Randall won the 1959 Mr. Universe, after famously slimming down from 425 pounds to 223 pounds after extensive training and dieting. Randall had gotten himself up to this weight in order to increase lifting strength for the sake of weightlifting, but decided to quit due to economic reasons (as a result of the extensive diet needed to sustain it).

Before slimming down, Randall ate between 12 and 18 eggs per day and drank an average of 8 to 10 quarts of milk. He later embraced a balanced diet, with vegetables, nuts and 2 boiled eggs for breakfast.

Randall later lived in Syosset, New York. He died on August 23, 2010, at the age of 79.

== Publications ==
- The Barbell Way To Physical Fitness (1970)
