= Leo Robert =

Canadian bodybuilder (1921–2016)

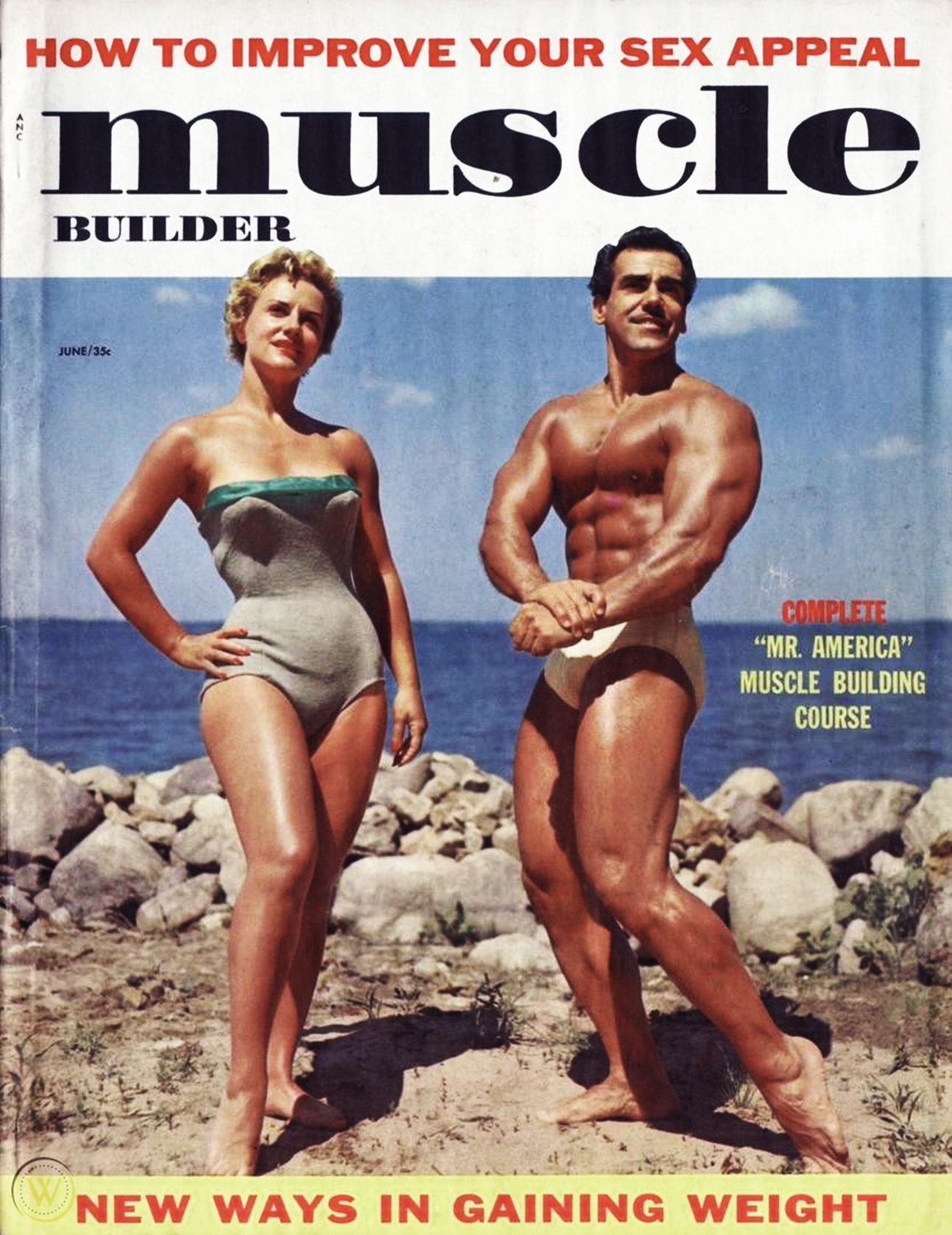
- Leo Robert on the cover of Muscle Builder magazine in 1956
- Born: January 16, 1921; Montreal, Quebec, Canada
- Died: November 28, 2016 (aged 95)
- Occupation: Bodybuilder

Leo Robert (January 16, 1921 – November 28, 2016) was a Canadian bodybuilder. At one time, he was billed as "America's most muscular man". He won the 1955 Mr. Universe.

== Early life ==
Leo Robert was born in Montreal on January 16, 1921. At a young age, Robert was profoundly interested in sports, particularly hockey. By being an athlete, he learned the value of sportsmanship and hard work.

== Career ==
Robert was introduced to bodybuilding by former bodybuilder Ben Weider. Robert realized he did not want to be cooped up in an office anymore. Throughout the 1950s and early 1960s, Robert competed and was very successful in bodybuilding.

== Personal life and death ==
Robert had two brothers and two sisters. His mother was raised on a farm, was a great cook, and was a devout Catholic. His father was an auto mechanic who owned his own garage. Leo Robert died on November 28, 2016, at the age of 95.
