= Bill Pearl =

American bodybuilder (1930–2022)

- Professional bodybuilder
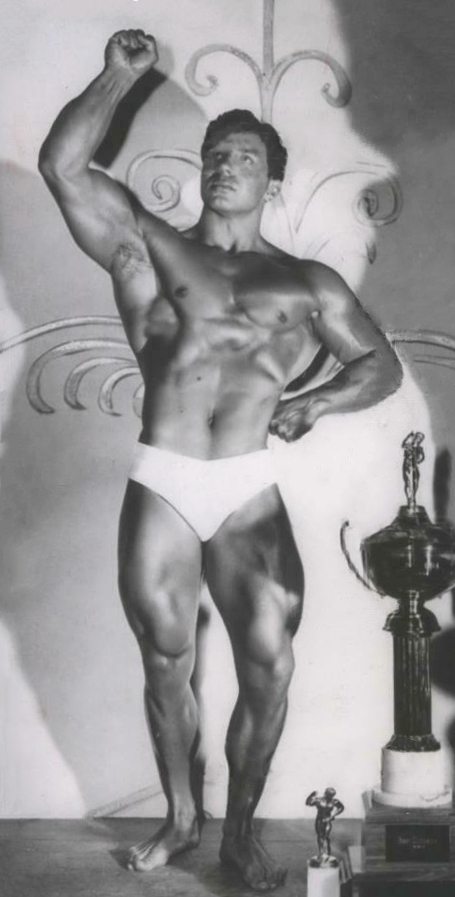
- Pearl after winning the 1956 Mr. U.S.A.

Personal info
- Born: October 31, 1930; Prineville, Oregon, U.S.
- Died: September 14, 2022 (aged 91); Phoenix, Oregon, U.S.

Best statistics
- Height: 5 ft 9 in (1.75 m) – 5 ft 10 in (1.78 m)
- Weight: 201 lb (91 kg) – 242 lb (110 kg)

Professional (Pro) career
- Pro-debut: Mr. Universe, Amateur; 1953
- Best win: Mr. Universe, Professional; 1956, 1961, 1967, 1971
- Active: Retired from competition after Mr Universe victory in 1971. Retired from guest posing in 1989. Continued Bodybuilding training at age 90+.

William Arnold Pearl (October 31, 1930 – September 14, 2022) was an American professional bodybuilder and athlete. During the 1950s and 60s, he won many titles and awards, including winning the Mr. Universe contest five times, and was named "World's Best-Built Man of the Century". He later became an expert trainer and author on bodybuilding.

== Early life and competitive career ==
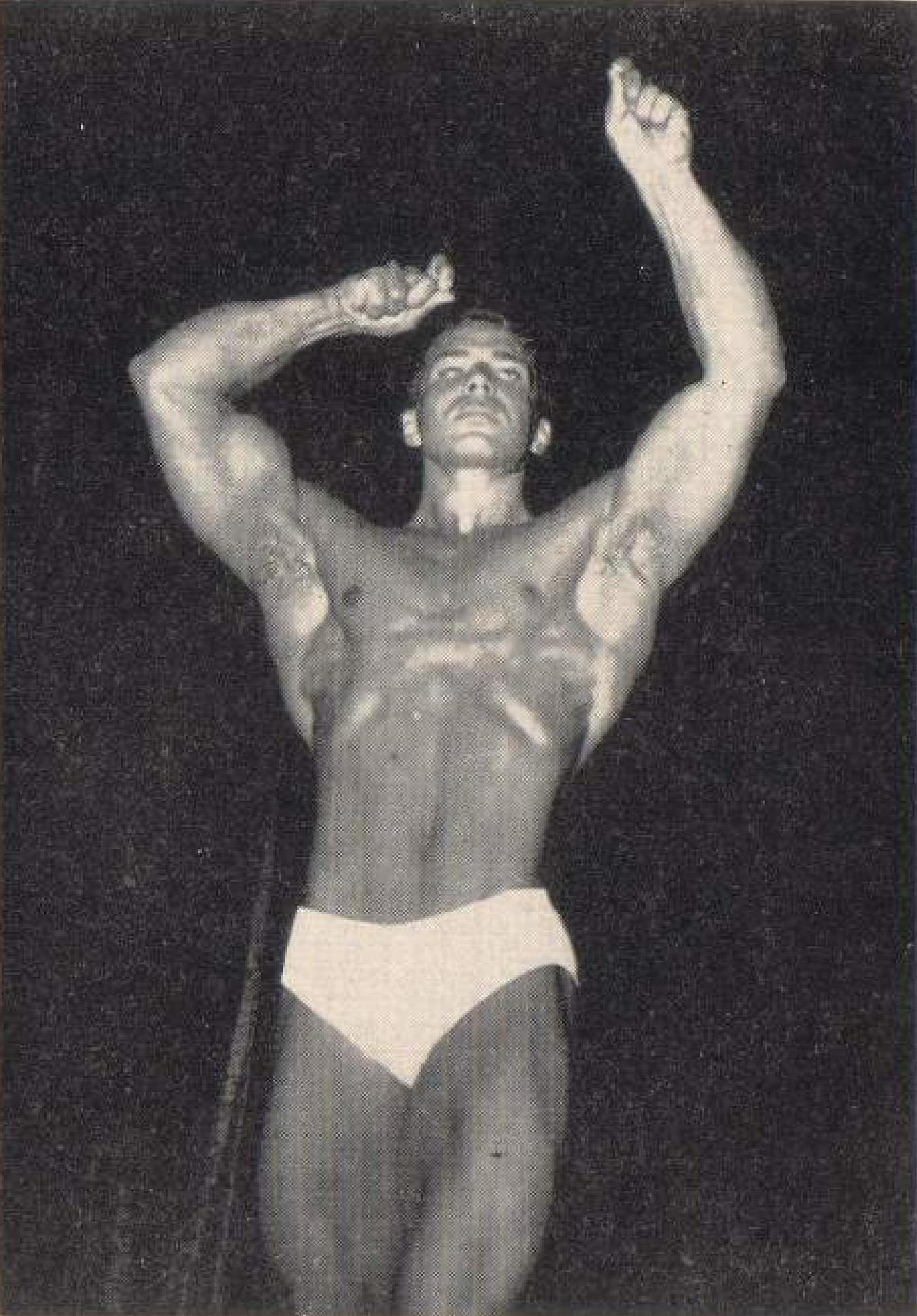
Pearl in competition in the 1953 Mr. America contest.

Pearl was born in Prineville, Oregon on October 31, 1930. He grew up in Yakima, Washington, where his father owned a restaurant. “We all helped out; it was kind of a family affair. Every day after school I'd lug 100-pound bags of grain and beans over and over, and that eventually built up my endurance,” he remembered. While enlisted in the United States Navy, stationed at San Diego Naval Air Station, he worked out at Leo Stern's Gym (which closed in 2024). Leo Stern, himself a champion bodybuilder, coached Pearl in his training and encouraged him to compete. In 1952, he competed in two local contests (3rd place in the Mr San Diego contest, followed by winning his first contest, Mr Oceanside). In 1953, he competed in 4 higher-level contests, and won them all. This included being crowned ‘Mr America’ and ‘Mr Universe’.

Pearl competed six times in two years, but then only competed twice in 1956, and then only once in the years 1961, 1967, and 1971. In all, he only competed in 11 contests, winning the overall in 9 of them. Of all the professional contests between 1956 and 1971, only Jack Delinger defeated Pearl (1956 NABBA Pro Mr Universe). During that 18-year span, no bodybuilder was more successful. Even with his final Mr Universe win (at age 41), Pearl defeated Frank Zane, Reg Park, Dave Draper, and Sergio Oliva. Though he was arguably the world's best bodybuilder in the mid-'60s, Pearl never competed in IFBB Mr. Olympia (which has been held annually beginning in 1965) but did the NABBA Pro Mr. Universe instead. “I didn’t compete in the Olympia because I considered it a Mickey Mouse affair,” he said of the earliest Olympia contests.

In addition to competing, Pearl gave posing and strongman exhibitions all around the world. His strongman act included blowing up hot water bottles, bending tent spikes, breaking chains, and tearing up license plates. Pearl also ran two Bill Pearl gyms in California.

=== Vegetarianism ===
Pearl became a vegetarian at age 39. His diet was lacto-ovo vegetarian, which means he ate dairy products and eggs. Pearl mentioned the benefits of vegetarian bodybuilding in his book Getting Stronger: Weight Training for Sports, published in 2005.

== Later career ==
Pearl is the author of the exercise book, Getting Stronger: Weight Training for Men and Women, which has sold over 350,000 copies in the United States and has been translated into four other languages, including Chinese. His book, Keys To The INNER Universe contains 1,500 weight-training exercises, weighs five pounds, and has sold over 60,000 copies. Pearl had his own monthly question-and-answer column called "Pearl of the Universe" in the bodybuilding magazine MuscleMag International as well as one in Muscle Builder (later Muscle & Fitness) magazine, titled "Wisdom of Pearl" in the 1970s and 1980s. In 2003 with co-author Kim Shott, Pearl published his autobiography, Beyond the Universe: The Bill Pearl Story.

During the 1980s, Pearl served as a mentor, trainer, and training partner to many of the top professionals that were still competing, including Mr. Olympia Chris Dickerson. In 2004, Pearl was awarded the Arnold Schwarzenegger Classic Lifetime Achievement Award for significantly impacting the world of bodybuilding. In November 2004, Pearl acted as Master of Ceremonies for Sri Chinmoy's Weightlifting celebration, in New York. In 2011 Pearl appeared in the documentary Challenging Impossibility describing when he hosted the 2004 strength exhibition by spiritual teacher and peace advocate Sri Chinmoy. The film was an Official Selection of the 2011 Tribeca Film Festival.

== Personal life and death ==
As of 2009, Pearl lived in Phoenix, Oregon. He was diagnosed with Parkinson's disease in 2016.

On April 7, 2022, Pearl was involved in an accident when he and his rider mower tumbled down an embankment, resulting in the mower landing on top of Pearl, who was "face-down in the grass." His initial diagnosis was a "compression fracture of his T-10 Vertebrae, among other things." Another neck fracture was discovered a few days later. Pearl died on September 14, 2022, at his home in Phoenix, Oregon. He was 91.

== Bodybuilding titles and awards ==
- 1952 Mr. San Diego, 3rd place (San Diego, California)
- 1952 Mr. Oceanside (Oceanside, California)
- 1953 Mr. Southern California (Los Angeles, California)
- 1953 Mr. California (Los Angeles, California)
- 1953 A.A.U., Mr. America (Indianapolis, Indiana)
- 1953 N.A.B.B.A., Mr. Universe Amateur (London, England)
- 1956 Mr. U.S.A., Professional (Los Angeles, California)
- 1956 N.A.B.B.A., Mr. Universe, Professional, Tall Man's Class (London, England)
- 1961 N.A.B.B.A., Mr. Universe, Professional (London, England)
- 1967 N.A.B.B.A., Mr. Universe, Professional (London, England)
- 1971 N.A.B.B.A., Mr. Universe, Professional (London, England)
- 1974 W.B.B.A., World's Best-Built Man of the Century (New York, New York)
- 1978 Entered into W.B.B.A., Hall of Fame (New York, New York)
- 1978 Elected the I.F.B.B. National Chairman of the Professional Physique Judges Committee (Acapulco, Mexico)
- 1988 Entered into Pioneers of Fitness Hall of Fame
- 1992 Entered into Gold's Gym Hall of Fame
- 1994 Guest of Honor of the Association of Oldetime Barbell & Strongmen 12th Annual Reunion
- 1994 Entered into The Joe Weider Hall of Fame
- 1995 A.A.U. Lifetime Achievement Award
- 1995 Oscar Heidenstam Foundation Hall of Fame
- 1996 American Powerlifters Federation Hall of Fame
- 1997 International Chiropractors Association Sports & Fitness Man of the Year
- 1999 I.F.B.B. Hall of Fame Inductee
- 2000 Spirit of Muscle Beach Award
- 2001 World Gym Lifetime Achievement Award
- 2001 Society of Weight-Training Injury Specialists Lifetime Achievement Award
- 2002 Canadian Fitness Award for 60+ Years of Inspiration to the Industry
- 2002 National Fitness Trade Journal Lifetime Achievement Award
- 2003 Iron Man magazine Peary & Mabel Radar Lifetime Achievement Award
- 2004 Arnold Schwarzenegger Lifetime Achievement Award
- 2006 PDI Night of Champions Lifetime Achievement Award
- 2010 National Fitness Hall of Fame Inductee & NFHOF "Lifetime Achievement Award" Recipient

== Books ==
- Beyond the Universe – The Bill Pearl Story
- Getting Back in Shape: 32 Workout Programs for Lifelong Fitness
- Getting in Shape: 32 Workout Programs for Lifelong Fitness
- Getting Stronger: Weight Training for Men and Women (Revised Edition)
- Getting Stronger: Weight Training for Men and Women
- Getting Stronger: Weight Training for Sports
- Keys to the INNER Universe

== Videos ==
- "Pearls of Wisdom – Bill Pearl a Bodybuilding Legend" (DVD, 150 minutes)
- "Bill Pearl & Dave Draper Seminar" (DVD, 75 minutes)

== See also ==
- List of male professional bodybuilders
- List of female professional bodybuilders
