= Shigeru Sugita =

Japanese bodybuilder (1946/1947–2025)

Shigeru Sugita (Japanese: 杉田茂; 1946 or 1947 – 13 April 2025) was a Japanese bodybuilding champion who, in 1976, became the first Japanese bodybuilder to win the Mr. Universe competition.

== Biography ==
At the 1976 Universe Championships, Sugita finished in first place in the short class and was the overall winner. On the day of the competition Sugita and two fellow countrymen and contestants, Kozo Sudo and Masashi Enomoto, posed for photographs in London's Hyde Park Square, an event which caused much interest to passers-by, who lined up along the fences to watch. Sugita died on 13 April 2025, at the age of 78.

== List of competitions ==
Year	Competition	Category/Class	Result
1970	JBBA Mr. Japan		3rd
1971	JBBA Mr. Japan		2nd
1972	JBBA Mr. Japan		winner
1973	NABBA Mr. Universe	short	2nd
1975	NABBA Mr. Universe	short	2nd
1976	NABBA Mr. Universe	short	1st
1976	NABBA Mr. Universe	short	overall winner
1979	NABBA Universe Pro.		4th
1981	IFBB Mr. International	middleweight	1st
1985	IFBB Night of Champions		14th
