= Hercules vs. Vampires =

2010 opera by Patrick Morganelli

Hercules vs. Vampires is an opera by composer Patrick Morganelli. The work is written as a companion piece to the 1961 film Hercules in the Haunted World.

== Premise ==
The work integrates the 1961 film by projecting the film in its entirety behind the action on stage. However, the soundtrack of the original film is replaced with Morganelli's music. The performers on stage sing a libretto adapted from the 1961 film screenplay by Mario Bava, Sandro Continenza, Franco Prosperi, and Duccio Tessari in sync with the projected film.

== Timeline ==
Commissioned by the Opera Theater Oregon, the work had its world premiere in Portland in May 2010. In April 2015 the work was staged by the Los Angeles Opera. In October 2017, the opera was staged at the Arizona Opera. Nashville Opera gave a performance of Hercules vs. Vampires on January 27, 2018.
