= Edward Kawak =

French bodybuilder

Edward Kawak (also known as Eduardo Kawak) (February 28, 1959, in Zahlé Lebanon – May 21, 2006, in China) was a French professional bodybuilder.

Kawak moved to France and began his career in bodybuilding. After winning 5 NABBA Universe titles, Kawak moved over to the IFBB. He died from a heart attack in China.

== Bodybuilding history ==
BORN:In Zahle Lebanon

1980

World Championships - WABBA, Overall Winner
World Championships - WABBA, Medium, 1st

1981

World Championships - WABBA, Professional, 1st

1982

European Championships - WABBA, Professional, 1st
Universe - Pro - NABBA, Winner
World Championships - WABBA, Professional, 2nd

1983

Universe - Pro - NABBA, Winner
World Championships - WABBA, Professional, 2nd

1984

European Championships - NABBA, Professional, 1st
Universe - Pro - NABBA, Winner
World Championships - WABBA, Professional, 1st

1985

European Championships - NABBA, Professional, 1st
Universe - Pro - NABBA, Winner
World Championships - WABBA, Professional, 3rd

1986

Los Angeles Pro Championships - IFBB, 8th
Night of Champions - IFBB, 8th
Olympia - IFBB, 13th
World Pro Championships - IFBB, 8th

1987

Grand Prix France - IFBB, 8th
Grand Prix Germany - IFBB, 8th
Night of Champions - IFBB, Did not place
Olympia - IFBB, 8th
World Pro Championships - IFBB, 4th

1988

Grand Prix England - IFBB, 17th
Grand Prix Germany - IFBB, 11th
Grand Prix Greece - IFBB, 10th
Grand Prix Spain - IFBB, 14th
Olympia - IFBB, 16th
World Pro Championships - IFBB, 12th

1989

Universe - Pro - NABBA, 2nd
World Championships - WABBA, Professional, 2nd

1990

World Championships - WABBA, Professional, 1st

1991

World Championships - NABBA, Professional, 3rd

1992

Universe - Pro - NABBA, 2nd

1993

Universe - Pro - NABBA, Winner

1995

World Championships - WABBA, Professional, 2nd

1996

Night of Champions - IFBB, 13th

1999

Olympia - Masters - IFBB, 13th

=== Death ===
Edward Kawak died on Saturday May 21, 2006, in Beijing China, of a heart attack. He was 47 years old.
