= Steve Michalik =

American bodybuilder (1949–2012)

- Professional bodybuilder

Personal info
- Born: Steven Michalik; January 8, 1949; Brooklyn, New York, U.S.
- Died: May 24, 2012 (aged 63); New York, U.S.

Best statistics
- Height: 5 ft 10 in (1.78 m)
- Weight: 210–265 lb (95–120 kg) (competition)

Professional (Pro) career
- Best win: AAU Mr. America (1972)
- Predecessor: Casey Viator
- Successor: Jim Morris

Steven Michalik (January 8, 1949 – May 24, 2012) was an American bodybuilder who won the AAU Mr. America title in 1972 and the NABBA Mr. Universe (Tall class) in 1975. After a 1975 traffic accident left him paralyzed from the waist down, he rehabilitated himself and returned to the stage; Arnold Schwarzenegger, commentating on Michalik's 1980 comeback, dubbed him "the Phantom Bodybuilder".

Michalik is also remembered as one of the sport's most prominent cautionary tales regarding anabolic steroid abuse. His decades of heavy drug use and the resulting organ damage were chronicled in Paul Solotaroff's 1991 essay "The Power and the Gory", after which Michalik renounced steroids and campaigned against them. He ran the hardcore "Mr. America's" gym in Farmingdale, New York, where he developed a punishing high-volume training method known as "Intensity or Insanity". He died of a self-inflicted gunshot wound in 2012.

== Early life ==
Michalik was born in Brooklyn, New York, on January 8, 1949. In later interviews he described a violent childhood dominated by an abusive, alcoholic father who favored his brother, and said he escaped into Captain America comic books and the films of Steve Reeves. As a teenager he took a menial job at a Vic Tanny health club to be near the bodybuilders who trained there and resolved to win the Mr. America title.

Michalik said he served in the United States Air Force during the Vietnam War and continued training in harsh conditions while stationed overseas, an experience he credited with shaping his mental approach to lifting. He married Thomasina Competello, with whom he had a son.

== Bodybuilding career ==
=== Amateur titles and Mr. America ===
Michalik placed third in the 1968 AAU Teenage Mr. America. In 1971 he won the AAU Mr. Apollo and AAU Mr. USA titles, and in 1972 he captured the AAU Mr. America crown, succeeding Casey Viator. In 1975 he won the Tall class at the NABBA Mr. Universe, held in London on September 27, behind overall professional winner Boyer Coe. He was filmed for the documentary Pumping Iron (1977) but was largely left out of the final cut.

=== Injury and comeback ===
Soon after the 1975 Universe, Michalik was badly hurt when a tractor-trailer struck his car on Long Island; he sustained spinal injuries and a torn sciatic nerve and was paralyzed from the waist down for roughly three years. With help from his younger brother, who massaged and moved his legs and dragged him between machines, he gradually regained the ability to walk and train. He returned as a surprise guest poser at the 1980 IFBB Grand Prix in Miami, where Schwarzenegger introduced him as the Phantom Bodybuilder. He competed on the IFBB professional circuit into the mid-1980s without winning a title and appeared in Pumping Iron II: The Women (1985) as a trainer to Bev Francis.

== Training philosophy ==
Michalik's training system, which his protégé John DeFendis labeled "Intensity or Insanity", emphasized extreme training volume and intensity with little rest, with sessions sometimes running for several hours. Adherents reportedly performed anywhere from 40 to as many as 70–100 sets for a single body part, beginning with a high-repetition conditioning circuit before moving to a building phase. In later years Michalik rebranded the approach as "Quantum fitness", stressing deliberate mental muscle contraction over heavy loads and shorter workouts.

== Steroid use and health problems ==
Michalik used anabolic steroids heavily from the mid-1970s onward; in Solotaroff's account he combined more than a dozen injectable and oral compounds—among them Anadrol, Dianabol and Halotestin—with amphetamines to sustain his marathon workouts. He told Solotaroff that he and other bodybuilders went to grotesque lengths in search of growth hormone, including drinking fluid drawn from the brains of monkeys, a claim that has been widely repeated.

He attributed severe and lasting damage to the drugs, including hypertension, extremely high cholesterol, internal bleeding and a near-fatal liver condition in which his endocrinologist found multiple blood-filled cysts (peliosis hepatis) initially mistaken for cancer. After he stopped using steroids, his weight collapsed by more than 100 lb (45 kg) as his kidneys failed. He later reported a heart attack, a stroke and kidney disease that required a transplant in 2011. Renouncing the drugs, he toured gyms and schools warning against steroid use and appeared in television documentaries on the subject.

== "The Power and the Gory" ==
The best-known account of Michalik's life is "The Power and the Gory", a long-form essay by journalist Paul Solotaroff published in The Village Voice on October 29, 1991. Drawing in part on Solotaroff's own youthful steroid use—later recounted in his memoir The Body Shop (2010)—the piece detailed Michalik's drug regimen and physical deterioration and became a frequently anthologized warning about bodybuilding's drug culture. Its closing admonition, "Sometimes, bigger is deader", is often quoted.

== Gym and later career ==
Michalik owned and ran "Mr. America's" gym in Farmingdale, New York, a hardcore facility known for its intimidating atmosphere and pro-drug signage. He trained a number of competitive bodybuilders there, most notably John DeFendis, the 1988 AAU Mr. USA. After leaving competition he wrote fitness books, including Atomic Fitness, promoted his training systems and ran conditioning programs for clients ranging from athletes to seniors.

== Death ==
Michalik died on May 24, 2012, at the age of 63, from a self-inflicted gunshot wound; he had undergone a kidney transplant the previous year and had struggled with depression after quitting steroids. News of his death was confirmed by DeFendis and spread through the bodybuilding community. Accounts differ on the circumstances in which he was found.

== Legacy ==
Michalik is remembered both as a leading amateur bodybuilder of the 1970s and as an enduring symbol of the dangers of performance-enhancing drugs. Tributes after his death credited his blunt public testimony with warning a generation of lifters about steroid abuse, and noted the dark irony that the man associated with the expression "death is no excuse" had taken his own life.

== Competition history ==
Competition record
Year	Competition	Federation	Result
1968	Teenage Mr. America	AAU	3rd
1971	Mr. Apollo	AAU	1st
1971	Mr. USA	AAU	1st
1972	Mr. America	AAU	1st
1975	Mr. Universe (Tall class)	NABBA	1st
1980	Grand Prix Miami	IFBB	4th
1980	Night of Champions	IFBB	6th
1983	World Pro Championships	IFBB	11th
1984	World Pro Championships	IFBB	11th

== Selected bibliography ==
- Michalik, Steve. Atomic Fitness: The Alternative to Drugs, Steroids, Wacky Diets, and Everything Else That's Failed. ISBN 978-1591201687.
