= Clarence Ross =

American bodybuilder (1923–2008)

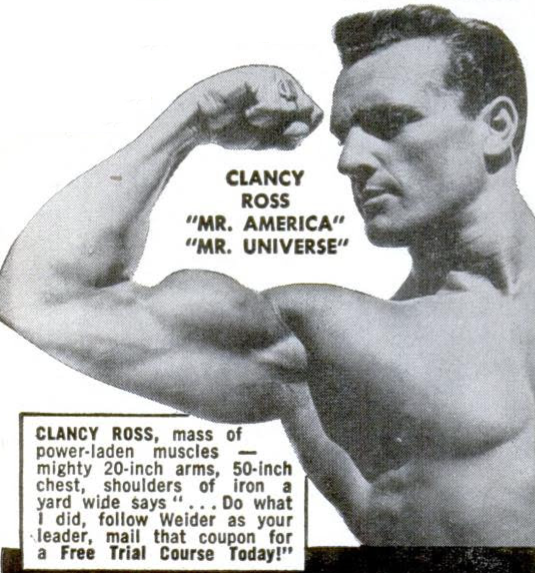
Clarence Ross in 1958

Clarence Ross (October 26, 1923 – April 30, 2008), also known as Clancy Ross, was a bodybuilder from the United States.

Ross was born in Oakland, California on October 26, 1923, the second of the four children of Hershel Ross, a teamster, and his wife Jeannette Levi. His mother died when he was young, so he grew up in a series of foster homes. He started weight training at age 17, weighing 135 pounds at a height of 5'10". He was motivated by the Japanese attack on Pearl Harbor to enlist in the Air Force, which he did on October 31, 1942 at San Francisco, and was then stationed in Las Vegas. Around this time he married his wife.

In 1945, Ross won the AAU Mr. America contest in Los Angeles. After this success, he started to appear on the covers of popular physique magazines such as Your Physique, Iron Man, Muscle Power, and Health and Strength. After leaving the service in November 1945, Ross opened a gym in Alameda, California. In 1976 Ross opened a bodybuilding gym in the Ygnacio Plaza Shopping Center, 1853 Ygnacio Valley Rd, Walnut Creek, CA 94598, where he ran it until 1981 when he sold the gym to Win Paris, who after 6 short months sold the gym to one of the Gold's Gym owners, Ed Conners. The gym was then sold to Fitness 19 and is still in business after 40+ years at the same location.

On March 13, 1948, Ross won the Mr. USA contest in Los Angeles ahead of the 1947 Mr. America, Steve Reeves. Ross attempted to defend his title in 1949 but placed second to John Grimek. However, he finished ahead of Steve Reeves, becoming one of only two men to beat Reeves twice (along with Grimek). He appeared in the 1949 Warner Brothers "Joe MacDoakes" short So You Want to Be a Muscle Man with George O'Hanlon, Phyllis Coates and Willard Waterman. In 1955, Clarence attempted a comeback at the Professional Mister Universe of London. He won the tall class category but was beaten for the Overall Title by the Canadian Leo Robert.

Ross died on 30 April 2008, he was 84 years old.
