= Sergei Ogorodnikov (bodybuilder) =

Russian professional bodybuilder (born 1965)

- Professional bodybuilder

Personal info
- Born: 1965 (age 60–61); Bavly, Soviet Union

Best statistics
- Height: 1.82 m (5 ft 11 1/2 in)
- Weight: Contest: 118 kg (260 lb); Off-season: 127 kg (280 lb)

Professional (Pro) career
- Pro-debut: 2001
- Best win: NABBA Mr. Universe 2005
- Predecessor: Hassan Al Saka
- Successor: Steve Sinton

Sergei Ogorodnikov (born 1965 in Bavly, Russian SFSR, Soviet Union) is a Russian professional bodybuilder.

== Biography ==
=== Bodybuilding career ===
Ogorodnikov began bodybuilding training in 1983 at student gym. From 1993, he participated in the European and world level competitions.

In 2000 he won NABBA Mr. Universe Amateur.

In 2005, after four years of taking second place, he won NABBA Mr. Universe Pro.

In 2009 he declared his intention to leave the sport due to injury.

=== Competitive stats ===
- Height: 182 cm
- Contest weight: 118 kg
- Off-season weight: 127 kg
- Arms: 18"
- Neck:
- Chest: 141 cm
- Waist: 91 cm
- Thighs: 69 cm
- Calves: 47 cm
- Wrist:
- Ankle:

=== Bodybuilding titles ===
Year	Competition	Place
2008	IFBB New York Pro	19
2008	IFBB Iron Man Pro	17
2007	IFBB Santa Susanna Pro Grand Prix	16
2006	IFBB Santa Susanna Pro Grand Prix	11
2005	NABBA Mr.Universe Pro	1
2003	NABBA Mr.Universe Pro	2
2002	NABBA Mr.Universe Pro	2
2001	NABBA Mr.Universe Pro	2
2000	NABBA Mr.Universe Amateur	1 (overall)
1999	NABBA Mr.Universe Amateur	3
1999	NABBA Bashkiria Cup	1 (overall)
1997	NABBA Mr.Universe Amateur	2
1997	NABBA Russian Championship	1 (179 cm+; overall)
1996	NABBA Mr.Universe Amateur	2
1996	NABBA Russian Championship	1 (179 cm+; overall)
1996	Открытое первенство Башкоркостана	1 (179 cm+)
1995	NABBA Mr.Universe Amateur	3
1995	Международный турнир Атлетического Союза NABBA России	1 (179 cm+; overall)
1994	Международный турнир Атлетического Союза NABBA России	2 (179 cm+)
1993	NABBA Russian Championship	1 (179 cm+)
1991	IFBB RSFSR Cup	5 (90 kg+)

== See also ==
- Universe Championships
