= Lance Dreher =

American bodybuilder

Lance Dreher (born in Chicago, Illinois, June 27, 1955) is a two-time Mr. Universe and former Mr. America. He has placed in the top three of ten professional body building championships. He has 23.5 inch biceps.

After his last competition in 1992, Dreher completed his PhD in Nutritional Counseling. He is a certified life coach, and a 2019 National Fitness Hall of Fame inductee.

Dreher currently hosts a radio talk show on KFYI called Fitness Talk with Lance Dreher.

== Competitions ==
Below is a list of all competitions in which Dreher has participated.

Competition	Place
1974 AU Teen Mr America	4th
1976 AAU Collegiate Mr America	1st
1977 AAU Mr America, Medium	9th
1980 AAU Mr. America, Heavyweight	3rd
1981 AAU Mr. America, Heavyweight	1st
1981 IFBB Mr Universe	1st
1981 NPC Gold's Classic, Heavyweight	3rd
1981 IFBB World Amateur Amateur Championships, Heavyweight	1st
1981 IFBB World Amateur Amateur Championships, Overall	1st
1982 IFBB Olympia	15th
1983 IFBB Olympia	15th
1984 Mr. Universe (Pro)	3rd
1984 WABBA World Championships - Professional	3rd
1985 Mr. Universe (Pro)	3rd
1985 WABBA World Championships - Professional	5th
1986 Mr. Universe (Pro)	1st
1988 IFBB Chicago Pro Invitational	6th
1989 IFBB Arnold Classic	9th
1991 IFBB Musclefest Grand Prix	15th
1992 IFBB Chicago Pro	19th
