= Valderrueda =

Coordinates: 42°48′55.93″N 4°56′53.27″W

- municipality
- Flag Coat of arms
- Interactive map of Valderrueda
- Country: Spain
- Autonomous community: Castile and León
- Province: León
- Municipality: Valderrueda

Area
  - Total: 160 km^{2} (62 sq mi)

Population (2025-01-01)
  - Total: 817
  - Density: 5.1/km^{2} (13/sq mi)
- Time zone: UTC+1 (CET)
  - Summer (DST): UTC+2 (CEST)

Valderrueda is a municipality located in the province of León, Castile and León, Spain. According to the 2004 census (INE), the municipality has a population of 1,138 inhabitants.

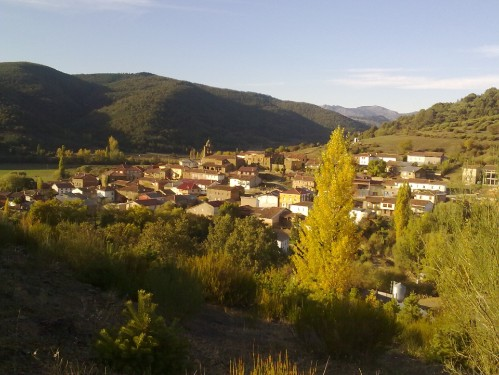
View of Valderrueda
