= Jenő Kiss =

Hungarian bodybuilder and personal trainer

Jenő Kiss(born February 10, 1972, in Budapest, Hungary), is an International Federation of BodyBuilding & Fitness (IFBB) professional bodybuilder. He works as a personal trainer.

In 1996 he won the World Amateur Bodybuilding Championships (formerly IFBB Mr. Universe).

Kiss has been featured in many fitness and bodybuilding articles. He currently resides in Budapest, Hungary.

Amateur bodybuilding titles

Year	Contest	Place
1989	Hungarian Championship	1st (90 kg, junior)
1990	Hungarian Championship	1st (90 kg, junior)
	Hungarian Championship	1st (90 kg)
	Index cup	1st
1991	Erlangen Cup	1st (+80 kg, German junior overall)
	Hungarian Championship	1st (overall)
	Junior World Championship	4th (90 kg)
	Budapest Championship	1st (+90 kg)
1992	Erlangen Cup	1st (+80 kg, German junior overall)
	Hungarian Junior Championship	1st (overall)
	Junior World Championship	2nd
1993	Budapest Championship	1st (+90 kg)
1995	Budapest Championship	1st (+90 kg)
	Erfurt Cup	1st
	World Amateur Bodybuilding Championships (formerly IFBB Mr. Universe)	2nd (+90 kg)
	Hungarian Junior Championship	1st
1996	World Amateur Bodybuilding Championships (formerly IFBB Mr. Universe)	1st (overall)
	Erfurt Cup	1st (+90 kg, overall)

Professional bodybuilding titles

Year	Contest	Place
1998	German Grand Prix	7th
1999	Night of Champions (New York)	19th
	IFBB Ironman	16th
2013	Nordic Pro	7th
	Prague Pro	14th
