= Hercules and the Conquest of Atlantis =

- Directed by: Vittorio Cottafavi
- Screenplay by: Vittorio Cottafavi Sandro Continenza Duccio Tessari Pierre Benoit Nicolo Ferrari
- Story by: Nicolo Ferrari
- Produced by: Achille Piazzi
- Starring: Reg Park Fay Spain Ettore Manni Luciano Marin
- Cinematography: Carlo Carlini
- Edited by: Maurizio Lucidi
- Music by: Gino Marinuzzi Jr. Armando Trovajoli
- Production company: SpA Cinematografica Comptoir Francais du Film Production
- Release date: 19 April 1961 (Italy)
- Running time: 101 minutes
- Country: Italy France

Hercules and the Conquest of Atlantis (Italian: Ercole alla conquista di Atlantide, lit. 'Hercules at the Conquest of Atlantis') is a 1961 film directed by Vittorio Cottafavi and starring Reg Park in his film debut as Ercole/Hercules. It was originally released in Super Technirama 70.

The film is also known as Hercules Conquers Atlantis in the United Kingdom and Hercules and the Captive Women in the United States where the film was not only retitled, but edited, rescored and given a title design by Filmation.

== Plot ==
When strange atmospheric events occur in the disunited city states of Ancient Greece, a forum debates what action to take. As there is no agreement, Androcles King of Thebes seeks the assistance of his friend, the legendary Hercules. Hercules, now married to Deianira with a son named Hylas, does not wish to leave the comfort of his family, though Hylas is keen for adventure.

Androcles takes matters into his own hands by drugging and kidnapping Hercules and placing him aboard a ship manned by a disreputable collection of former slaves and criminals. The only members of the expedition Androcles can trust are his sidekick, Timoteo the dwarf and Hylas who has to hide below deck from Hercules lest he face his wrath for leaving home. Rather than being angry, Hercules merely lazes away on deck without offering any assistance.

When the supply of fresh water is sabotaged, the ship lands on an island to replenish their supply. The crew mutinies by attacking Androcles but Hercules turns the tide. The crew is left stranded on the island; however, Hercules discovers Hylas on board.

Continuing their voyage, a storm wrecks the ship and separates all of them. Hercules sees a vision of Androcles begging for his help. Coming ashore on a mist-shrouded island he sees a woman held captive: not only chained to a cliff but gradually becoming a part of the rock formation. When he rescues her, he has to fight Proteus a god able to change form into various creatures. Defeating Proteus, Hercules discovers the woman he rescued is Princess Ismene, daughter of Antinea, the Queen of Atlantis, where he has landed. Hercules soon discovers his son Hylas and Timoteo and they bring the rescued Princess to Antinea.

Though welcomed at first, Ismene discovers that she has been selected for sacrifice: a prophecy foretells that if she is not killed, Atlantis and its population will be destroyed. The death of Proteus has already stripped Atlantis of its protective fog that keeps it unseen by the outside world. Ismene is recaptured and taken for execution. Antinea denies all knowledge of Androcles; his memory has been taken away and he is hidden from his friends. During a celebration, Hercules discovers that children are selected and taken away from their parents for an unknown reason.

Things fall into place when Hercules and his companions not only rescue Ismene but a large group of prisoners in a pit. The rescued prisoners explain that children are taken to a special stone that either transforms them either into blond supermen or disfigures the weak ones who are then placed in the pit. A priest explains that the stone is made from the blood of Uranus. The power of Uranus's stone has created for Antinea an invincible army of black-uniformed blond supermen with which she plans to conquer the world.

The rescued prisoners attack Antinea's palace but all are killed by her army. Hercules confronts Antinea and begins battling with her soldiers, but he falls into a pit where he is reunited with Hylas. Hercules and Hylas escape, and Hercules tells his son to flee the island while Hercules attempts to destroy the stone of Uranus.

Hylas finds Timoteo, who says Ismene and Androcles are to be sacrificed by being tied to a ship that will be sent ablaze then set adrift. Hylas and Timoteo stop the soldiers and save Ismene and Androcles as the four of them flee the island on the same ship. The high priest of Uranus tells Hercules the stone can be destroyed by the rays of the sun. Hercules smashes a hole into the top of the stone's cave and flees. Hercules swims out to the ship, as the sun's rays finally strike the stone, causing Atlantis to erupt in explosions and be destroyed.

== Cast ==
- Reg Park as Ercole (Hercules)
- Fay Spain as Queen Antinea of Atlantis
- Ettore Manni as Androclo, Re di Tebe
- Luciano Marin as Illo (Hylas)
- Laura Efrikian as Ismene
- Enrico Maria Salerno as Re di Megara
- Ivo Garrani as Re di Megalia
- Gian Maria Volonté as Re di Sparta
- Mimmo Palmara as Astor
- Mario Petri as Zenith, prete di Urano
- Mino Doro as Oraclo
- Salvatore Furnari as Timoteo (Timotheus in the English dub)
- Alessandro Sperli
- Mario Valdemarin as Gabor
- Luciana Angiolillo as Deianira
- Maurizio Coffarelli as Proteus the Monster
- Nicola Sperli as Dyanaris
- Leon Selznick as Narrator (English dub)

== Release ==
Hercules and the Conquest of Atlantis was released in Italy with a 101-minute running time on 19 April 1961. It was released in the United States on 15 April 1963.

== Reception ==
Describing it as "an imaginative entry in the sword and sandal genre," Cottafavi called it "Neo-Mythology".

Christopher Frayling noted the film's slapstick violence at the beginning as a link to the Spaghetti Western; Frank Burke in an essay in the book Popular Italian Cinema noted the film's depiction of Nazi Germany and the Atomic Age and Park's depiction of the Italian quality of "sprezzatura" in his portrayal of Hercules.

=== Mystery Science Theater 3000 ===
Under the name Hercules and the Captive Women, the film was featured in episode #412 of Mystery Science Theater 3000. The episode debuted September 12, 1992, on Comedy Central. The episode is notable for Gypsy trying her hand at riffing the film along with Joel, Tom Servo, and Crow, but she leaves after the first five minutes when she realizes the movie "isn't very good." Series writer Paul Chaplin writes this was in response to viewers who asked why Gypsy didn't go into the theater. "She's very busy," Chaplin writes, "and in this show she realizes that's just as well."

As for the movie, Chaplin calls it "a very confusing foreign movie" and notes "'captive' women' makes no sense because there's captive everybody."

Writer Jim Vorel placed the episode at #140 out of the 197 MST3K episodes from the first twelve seasons. Vorel declared Hercules and the Captive Women was the weakest of MST3K's four Hercules episodes. He also noted "the overall incoherence of the production," agreeing with Chaplin that the plot is hard to follow. However, Vogel writes the "iguana man" and the opportunity for tons of Uranus jokes make the episode enjoyable for him.

Shout! Factory included the episode on the MST3K: Volume XXIX DVD box set. The set, released on March 25, 2014, also included three other episodes: Untamed Youth (episode #112), The Pumaman (episode (#903), and The Thing That Couldn't Die (episode #805).

== See also ==
- List of films featuring Hercules
