= Len Sell =

English bodybuilder (born 1935)

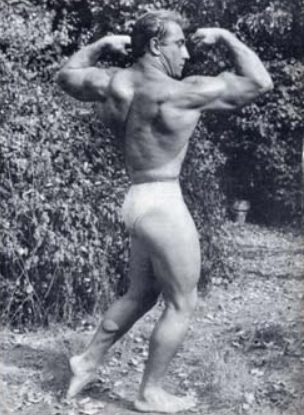
Len Sell

Leonard F. Sell (born 3 February 1935) is an English professional bodybuilder who was prominent in the late 1950s and early 1960s. He won two Mr. Universe titles – amateur in 1959, and professional in 1962. Sell was born in Kent on 3 February 1935. He later opened his own gym in Harlow, Essex.
