= Oscar Heidenstam =

British bodybuilder (1911–1991)

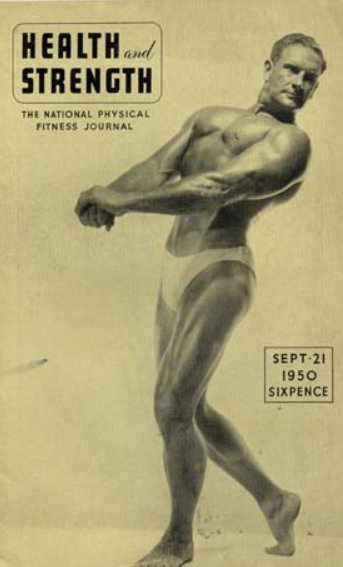
- Heidenstam in 1950
- Born: 27 February 1911; Cyprus
- Died: 21 March 1991 (aged 80); Kensington, London, England
- Occupation: Bodybuilder

Oscar Frederick Heidenstam (27 February 1911 – 21 March 1991) was a Cyprus-born British bodybuilding champion and physical culturist. He was president of the World Amateur Body Building Association (WABBA), the National Amateur Bodybuilders Association (NABBA), and NABBA International. He is 'The Father of British Bodybuilding'.

== Early life ==
Oscar Heidenstam was born in Cyprus on 27 February 1911. From the age of nine, he was educated in the UK. He had a passion for sport from a very young age, and throughout his school years he participated in track and field athletics, gymnastics, hand balancing, swimming, diving, water polo, tennis, squash, rackets, hockey, football, and rugby. At the age of 18 he won thirty medals and two silver cups for his achievements in various sports including rugby, track and field athletics, and gymnastics.

== Military career ==
Heidenstam served in the British armed forces during the Second World War, and by the time he left the military in 1948 he had attained the rank of Major. During the war he was a physical training instructor with the Army Physical Training Corps (APTC), as well as being involved in action in Palestine (Israel), Egypt, Tunisia, Sudan, Yugoslavia and Turkey.

== Bodybuilding ==
In 1936, Heidenstam won his first bodybuilding contest. A year later he won the 1937 Mr. Britain contest on his first attempt. When he won the Mr. Europe contest in 1939, he became the first British bodybuilder ever to achieve this. During his military career he twice won the 'Best Developed Man In The Services Cup', in 1942 and 1945. He continued to compete in contests for many years after the war, winning a number of them. In 1957 he won his final bodybuilding contest: Senior Mr. Britain.

== Later life ==
After the war, Heidenstam continued his career as a physical training instructor and over the years that followed trained not only members of the public but famous sports people and celebrities.

He wrote several fitness articles for the Daily Mirror newspaper, and joined the publishing team of Health and Strength magazine in 1953, a magazine which he became owner of in 1974.

He became President of the World Amateur Body Building Association (WABBA) in 1977, President of the National Amateur Bodybuilders Association (NABBA) in 1980, and President of NABBA International in 1984.

Heidenstam was Secretary and President of NABBA when he died in 1991, aged 80.

== Books ==
Heidenstam was the author of several books:

'Modern Bodybuilding' (1955) Faber Popular Books

'Modern Health & Figure Culture' (1960) Faber Popular Books

'Fit at 40 & After' (1961) Faber Popular Books

'Muscle Building for Beginners' (1981) W. Foulsham & Co Ltd

'Body Beautiful' (1984) W. Foulsham & Co Ltd

'Beginners Guide to Muscle Building' (1991) W. Foulsham & Co Ltd

'Body Building for women' (1985) Gallery Books

'Bodybuilding for men' (1985) Gallery Books

== See also ==
- List of Cypriots
