= Paul Wynter =

Competitive bodybuilder (1935–2019)

Paul Wynter (1935–2019) was an Antigua and Barbuda competitive bodybuilder and sometime film actor. He is best known for his two wins in the Mr. Universe competition.

A native of Antigua and Barbuda in the Caribbean, he was born on October 28, 1935. He died on January 14, 2019, aged 83.

== Bodybuilding and Mr. Universe ==
Wynter was first awarded the title of Mr. Universe in 1960. He won the title again in 1966, and placed highly in the same competition over several years from his first placing in 1958. During his career as a bodybuilder he was admired for having one of the most perfectly symmetrical bodies in the world, standing at a relatively average 5'8" tall and weighing 180 lbs. He was featured in at least fourteen issues of Health and Strength Magazine, even as recently as 1997.

== Film career ==
Wynter's best known roles are arguably in the Italian-made sword and sandal films Atlas in the Land of the Cyclops (1961) co-starring Gordon Mitchell and Mole Men Against the Son of Hercules (1961) co-starring Mark Forest. Additionally, he appeared in several French-made comedies.

Wynter performed his strongman act on Granada TV's much-loved variety show, The Wheeltappers and Shunters Social Club in 1974.

== Later life ==
According to a 2003 article, Wynter was living in New Moston, Manchester with his wife Mary, who two years his junior and manages a care home. In that year, a mentally unstable neighbor broke into the couple's home and attacked them with a knife. While the couple survived the incident, Wynter sustained a stab to the chest that punctured his lung.

The local police force honored Wynter with a special award. When it was revealed that the attacker, who had been caught, was awarded freedom by the Manchester court, Wynter boycotted the ceremony out of protest. His wife Mary accepted the award on his behalf.
