= Tony Emmott =

British bodybuilder

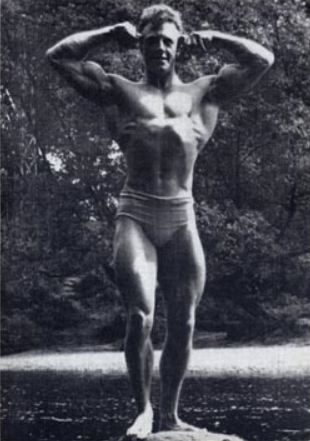
- Born: 1938; Ilkley
- Occupation: Bodybuilder

Tony Emmott (born 1938) is an English bodybuilding champion, who won the 1977 Mr. Universe (professional) competition.

== Biographical ==
Emmott was a postal deliverer, by occupation, prior to becoming a successful bodybuilder.

He owned his own gym, Olicana Health Studio, in Ilkley, Yorkshire, UK, which had a health food restaurant extension, added by Emmott. In 1979, well-known bodybuilding writer and photographer, Chris Lund, visited Emmott at his gym to conduct an interview about Emmott's training techniques, Emmott at the time being one of the country's top bodybuilders.

Emmott has appeared on the cover of a number of bodybuilding magazines including Health and Strength, Muscle Training Illustrated, Athletic Sport Journal, and Muscle World.

== List of competitions ==
| Year | Competition | Category/Class | Result |
|---|---|---|---|
| 1960 | NABBA Mr. Universe | medium | 4th |
| 1961 | NABBA Mr. Britain | | 3rd |
| 1969 | NABBA Mr. Britain | | 3rd |
| 1971 | NABBA Universe Pro. | short | 3rd |
| 1972 | NABBA Universe Pro. | short | 3rd |
| 1972 | WBBG Pro. Mr. World | | 2nd |
| 1973 | NABBA Universe Pro. | short | 2nd |
| 1973 | WBBG Pro. Mr. World | | 3rd |
| 1974 | NABBA Universe Pro. | short | 3rd |
| 1975 | NABBA Universe Pro. | short | 3rd |
| 1976 | WBBG Olympus | | 3rd |
| 1976 | NABBA Universe Pro. | short | 1st |
| 1976 | NABBA Universe Pro. | | 2nd |
| 1976 | WBBG Pro. Mr. World | | winner |
| 1977 | NABBA Universe Pro. | | winner |
| 1977 | WABBA World Championships | professional | 2nd |
| 1978 | IFBB Olympia | lightweight | 5th |
| 1978 | IFBB Olympia | | 8th |
| 1979 | IFBB Canada Pro. Cup | | 7th |
