= John Grimek =

American weightlifter (1910–1998)

- Professional bodybuilder
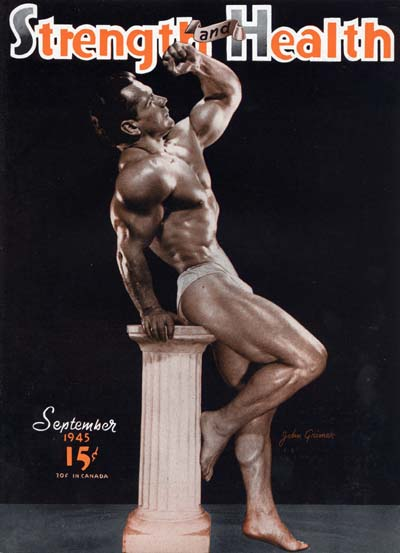
- Grimek featured on the cover of Strength and Health magazine, 1945

Personal info
- Nickname: "The Monarch of Muscledom" "The Glow"
- Born: June 17, 1910; Perth Amboy, New Jersey, U.S.
- Died: November 20, 1998 (aged 88); York, Pennsylvania, U.S.

Best statistics
- Height: 5 ft 8.5 in (174 cm)
- Weight: 195 lb (88 kg)

Professional (Pro) career
- Pro-debut: Olympic Games; 1936, Berlin
- Successor: Steve Reeves

John Carroll Grimek (June 17, 1910 – November 20, 1998) was an American bodybuilder and weightlifter active in the 1930s and 1940s. Grimek was Mr. America in 1940 and 1941, and Mr. Universe in 1948. In 1949, he won his last contest, the AAU Mr. USA. Grimek retired from bodybuilding undefeated. Throughout his career he carried the nicknames "the Monarch of Muscledom" and "the Glow."

== Life ==
Grimek was born in Perth Amboy, New Jersey, the son of Slovak immigrants George and Maria Grimek, peasants from the village Ústie nad Oravou in northern Slovakia.

Grimek moved to York, Pennsylvania, in 1935 to join Bob Hoffman, the founder of York Barbell. Besides his bodybuilding exploits, Grimek also represented the United States in weightlifting at the 1936 Olympic Games in Berlin, where he took 9th place in the men's heavyweight category.

Grimek was Mr. America in 1940 and 1941, and Mr. Universe in 1948. In 1949, he won his last contest, the AAU Mr. USA, against a field that included Steve Reeves, Clarence Ross, George Eiferman, and Armand Tanny. Grimek retired from bodybuilding undefeated.

Grimek featured in many bodybuilding articles and magazines. He was also the editor of Muscular Development. Despite his retirement, he continued serious training for many years, and was still able to perform squats with over 400 pounds for repetitions in his late 60s. Grimek died on November 20, 1998, in York, Pennsylvania, at the age of 88.

== Training method ==
In the 1950s and 1960s, full body workouts, as opposed to split workouts, were the normal way to train, and bodybuilders such as Grimek and Steve Reeves (Mr. America of 1947, Mr. World of 1948, and Mr. Universe of 1950), normally trained the whole body during their workouts.

Grimek trained three days a week (Monday, Wednesday, and Friday). His routine made use of the common 3×10 training protocol, of which Grimek was one of the first-ever proponents. Grimek advised that lifters take between 45 seconds and 1 minute rest between sets and between 2 and 3 minutes rest between exercises. For good form, all reps were to be slow and controlled.

== Posthumous tributes ==
Grimek was inducted into the IFBB Hall of Fame in 1999.

He is depicted as part of a mural located at 37 West Philadelphia Street in York, Pennsylvania, which was finished in 2000.
