= National Amateur Body-Builders' Association =

British sports organisation

- Sport: Bodybuilding, Figure, Physique.
- Abbreviation: NABBA
- Founded: 1950; 76 years ago, England
- Chairman: Jim Charles (NABBA UK)
- Secretary: Val Charles

Official website
- www.nabba.co.uk

The National Amateur Body-Builders' Association, more commonly referred to as NABBA, was founded in the United Kingdom in 1950 by the Health & Strength League to promote bodybuilding. Although the original intention was to promote physique contests in the UK, the popularity of the Mr Universe contest, and later Ms Universe contest, drew interest from competitors around the world. Today NABBA International maintains affiliations with around 60 countries.

== History ==
The history of NABBA as an organisation can be traced back to 1898 when an American entrepreneur, Bernarr Macfadden, and an English cycling enthusiast, Hopton Hadley, teamed up to promote what would become the earliest physical culture magazine. The original title of the magazine is debatable; however, in 1898 Macfadden sold his share to Hadley and it quickly became known as Health & Strength magazine. Health & Strength Magazine served as the official magazine of NABBA for many years before being sold. The current Health & Strength publication utilises the name but bears little resemblance to the original magazine. In 1906 the Health & Strength League was formed to promote physical culture and within a few years it boasted thousands of members across the United Kingdom.

By the 1920s the Health & Strength League had begun organising physique contests, which were a precursor to modern bodybuilding contests. In 1930 the Health & Strength League hosted the Mr. Britain contest with William T Coggins as the inaugural winner. Since the mid-1950s the Mr. Britain contest has been promoted by the NABBA UK.

In 1948 following the first Mr. Universe contest, won by John Grimek, the Health & Strength League made plans to form a separate governing association dedicated to bodybuilding. In late 1949 these plans would come to fruition and when the Mr. Universe contest was next held in 1950 it would be the NABBA Mr. Universe contest.

In 1955 Oscar Heidenstam, a former Mr. Britain winner and Mr. Universe competitor and a long-standing member of the Health & Strength League, became the General Secretary of NABBA and continued in this position for many years. As competitors from outside of the UK wanted to compete in the Mr. Universe contest, other countries affiliated and over time NABBA International was formed as the world governing organisation. The World Amateur Bodybuilding Association was directly affiliated with NABBA between 1977 and 1983, part of the reason for the formation of NABBA International as an independent body in 1984. Oscar Heidenstam was elected Chairman of NABBA UK in 1980 and subsequently became president of NABBA International upon its formation.

Following Heidenstam's death in 1991, NABBA International was separated into Northern Hemisphere and Southern Hemisphere jurisdictions. It was soon reunited as a single world body with Ivan Dunbar of NABBA Northern Ireland as the International World President. When Dunbar died in 2009, Graeme Lancefield, President of NABBA Australia, was elected as the NABBA International World President until 2017.

In 2017, Eddy Ellwood was elected President of NABBA International with former chair and Honorary Life Councillor, Bryan Robinson, as the vice president of NABBA International.

The NABBA UK Council continues to govern bodybuilding within the UK and also promotes the Universe Championships each year in England. Jim Charles was elected Chair of the NABBA UK Council in 2014 and remains in this position as of 2019.

Dozens of countries are affiliated to NABBA International including Australia, Austria, Brazil, the Republic of Ireland, USA, Germany, Italy, Ukraine, Korea, China, Israel, New Zealand, Iran, Lebanon, Greece, Cyprus and Canada. The name NABBA by itself however usually refers to the NABBA UK.

== Competitions ==
Each country affiliated with NABBA International holds an annual National Championships, usually prior to the World Championships or Universe Championships. In most cases these events are a qualifier for athletes seeking to travel internationally to compete.

Significant contests include:

- NABBA Universe
- NABBA World Championships
- Mr. Britain
- NABBA Mr. Wales
- NABBA Mr. England
- NABBA Mr. Scotland
- NABBA Mr. Ireland
- NABBA Mr. USA
- Mr. Australia
- Mr. Olympia

== See also ==
- Universe Championships
- International Federation of BodyBuilding & Fitness (IFBB)
