= Vince Gironda =

American bodybuilder (1917–1997)

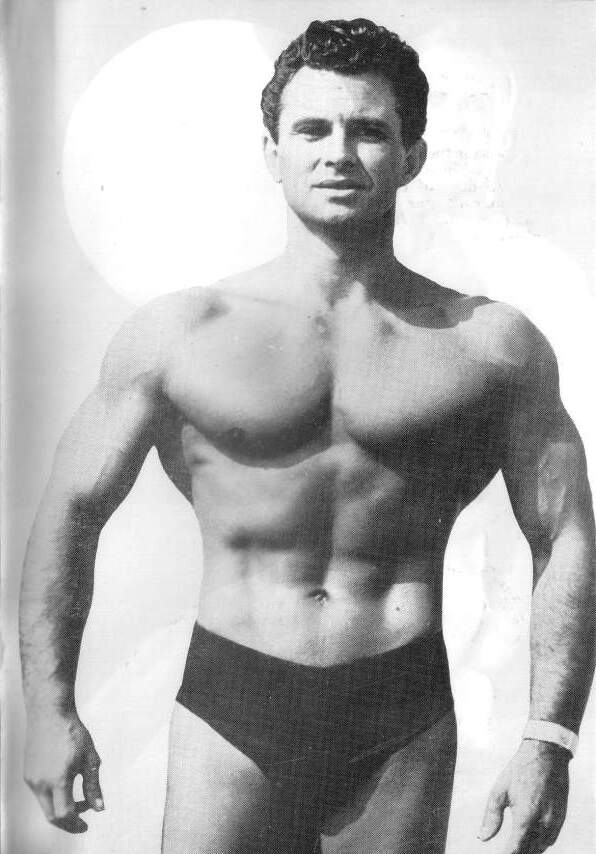
- Gironda in a 1953 issue of Tomorrow's Man magazine
- Born: Vincent Anselmo Gironda; November 9, 1917; The Bronx, New York, U.S.
- Died: October 18, 1997 (aged 79); Ventura County, California, U.S.
- Occupations: Bodybuilder, personal trainer, author
- Height: 172.5 cm (5 ft 8 in)
- Spouse: Madeline Gironda
- Children: 1

Vincent Anselmo Gironda (November 9, 1917 – October 18, 1997) was an American professional bodybuilder, personal trainer, author, co-founder of the supplement company NSP Nutrition, and owner of the celebrity-frequented Vince's Gym. As a competing bodybuilder, he placed second in the 1951 Mr. America contest. His nickname was the "Iron Guru".

During the 1960s, Gironda's reputation grew as a personal trainer as a result of his pupils' winning all the important contests, the most well known being Larry Scott, winning the first two IFBB Mr. Olympias in 1965 and 1966. Other notable bodybuilders who trained under his tutelage were Mohammed Makkawy (1983 and 1984 Mr. Olympia runner up), Don Howorth (Mr. America 1967), Rick Wayne (Mr. Universe 1965, 1967, 1969, Mr. World 1967, 1970), Arnold Schwarzenegger (seven-time Mr. Olympia), Frank Zane (three-time Mr. Olympia), Lou Ferrigno, and Freddy Ortiz.

== Biography ==
=== Early life and career ===
Gironda was born in The Bronx, New York. While he was still a young child, the family moved out west to Los Angeles when his father, a stuntman, was offered work in the upcoming Ben Hur film. Vince tried his hand at being a stuntman as well but when he saw a photograph of John Grimek, he realized he needed more physical development and began lifting weights at the age of 22.

The first gym he trained at was the local YMCA. He was there for approximately eight months before moving to the Easton Brothers' gym. The Easton brothers taught him to be one of their instructors. He worked there and experimented with training protocols before opening his own gym in North Hollywood, California, in 1948 called Vince's Gym, where he earned a reputation as a personal trainer.

=== Diet ===
Gironda promoted a low-carbohydrate high-fat diet and invented a diet known as the "Steak and Eggs Diet". He ate butter, cream, eggs, milk and red meat in high quantities and only a small amount of carbohydrates. His dietary views are mentioned in his book Unleashing the Wild Physique, published in 1984.

He recommended the use of numerous supplements, including desiccated liver tablets, free form amino acids, 225 mcg kelp tablets, Vitamin C tablets, digestive enzymes and raw glandular such as adrenal and orchic tablets. In certain circumstances, Gironda would recommend up to three dozen fertile hen-eggs a day, along with raw (unhomogenized, unpasteurized) cream or half-and-half milk. Large amounts of fertile eggs, he said, are equal to the anabolic steroid Dianabol in effectiveness. However, he was vehemently against the use of steroids for physique development, claiming that they contributed to a grotesque appearance.

Although Gironda was not a vegetarian, he endorsed a lacto-ovo vegetarian diet for his bodybuilding vegetarian readers.

=== Competitive history ===
- 1949 Pro Mr California - 4th
- 1950 Pro Mr USA - tied for 4th
- 1951 Pro Mr America - 2nd
- 1957 Pro Mr USA - 3rd
- 1962 Nabba Pro Mr. Universe - Class 2, 2nd

=== Writer ===
In the 1970s Vince wrote countless articles for Iron Man, managed his mail-order business, started a nutrition supplement company (NSP Nutrition) and authored his own training and nutrition manuals, all the time still operating his gym.

In the 1980s, a book was published with the collaboration of MuscleMag International publisher Robert Kennedy titled "Unleashing the Wild Physique". It contained considerable knowledge Vince gathered and tested throughout his 30+ year career. The release of the book prompted a promotion tour where the Iron Guru gave sold-out seminars throughout the US and Canada.

=== Death ===
Gironda died of heart failure on October 18, 1997, in Ventura County, less than a month before his 80th birthday.

== Training philosophy ==
Similar to Steve Reeves and George Eiferman, Gironda favoured a full-body workout, as opposed to a split workout. However, his original 8 x 8 routine consisted of an Upper Body Split and Lower Body Split on various days. During his career he would routinely promote 6 x 6 (6 sets x 6 reps) or 8 x 8 (8 sets x 8 reps) schemes. For 8 x 8 sessions, Gironda stressed good technique, good tempo and a good deal of weight.

Gironda believed: "Beginners should start off with 3 sets of 8 reps. After the first month they should graduate to 5 sets of 5 reps. The third month, 6 sets of 6 reps. This course should be retained for at least 3 months before trying the advanced 8 sets of 8 reps." His 8 x 8 program was what he called his “honest” program because of how it humbled lifters to use lighter weight and focus on working the muscles instead of concentrating on what was being used. His pre-contest system of training for Mohamed Makkawy consisted of attacking three different body parts with three exercises per part (a total of 24 sets per muscle area—8 sets per exercise), a routine Makkawy repeated exactly twice more. This routine included three 2 1/2-hour workouts, with one hour off between training sessions. The second day consisted of training the arms and calves, and the third day consisted of training the upper legs and abdominals.

== See also ==
- Raw Egg Nationalist
