= 1968 Mr. Olympia =

Professional bodybuilding competition

The 1968 Mr. Olympia contest was an IFBB professional bodybuilding competition held in September 1968 at the Brooklyn Academy of Music in Brooklyn, New York. It was the 4th Mr. Olympia competition held.

Sergio Oliva defended his title unopposed. Other contestants were expected to compete but all withdrew. Harold Poole received a job promotion in 1968 and it adversely affected his ability to train for the competition. Dave Draper found himself in the Hollywood spotlight, and movie making and film promotion disrupted his ability to prepare for the contest. Chuck Sipes was in attendance that evening. He won the Mr. World the same day, and had also taken time to perform strongman stunts. But, on the advice of Joe Weider, Chuck withdrew from the competition.

== Results ==
Place	Prize	Name
1	$1,000	(Cuba) Sergio Oliva
