= Leroy Colbert =

American bodybuilder (1933–2015)

Leroy Colbert (May 9, 1933, New York, US – November 20, 2015, age 82) was an American professional bodybuilder. He is credited as the first man to develop 21 inch arms drug-free. He was the first ever Black athlete to appear on the front cover of Muscle Power magazine, and is regarded as a pioneer who broke the race barrier. After he formed a close friendship with Joe Weider in his 20s, Leroy rose to fame – placing first in the Mr. Eastern America competition in 1953, a year after winning the Mr. New York City title. His career, however, was cut short after a motorcycle accident in 1954.

Despite his career-ending injury, Leroy remained active within the bodybuilding industry. He is known for pioneering a handful of now-infamous training techniques, including the 21s curls, where you perform seven curls from the bottom to halfway up, seven curls from your chest to halfway down, and then seven full curls. He also standardized training the arms in alternating fashion — biceps, triceps, and biceps — which is commonplace in physique sports. He judged many contests including the first Mr. Olympia competition in 1965.

He was inducted into the IFBB Hall of Fame in 2003.

== Early life ==
Born in New York, USA in 1933, Leroy Colbert became involved within fitness from the age of 10, when he read a bodybuilding magazine which sparked his interest in bodybuilding from an early age.

== Competition history ==
1954: Junior Mr. America – did not place

1953: Mr. Eastern America – 1st place

1952: AAU Mr. New York State – 5th place

1952: AAU Mr. America – 17th place

1952: Mr. New York City – 1st place

1951: Mr. Eastern America – 6th place

== Training method ==
Leroy was a strong believer in full-body workout routine made of alternating pushing and pulling movements. He popularised his Full body blitz program, which worked multiple muscle groups on the same training day, as opposed to a split workout routine.

== Death ==
Colbert died on November 20, 2015, aged 82.
