= Muscle House =

Historic bodybuilding house

Coordinates: 34.009287°N 118.494519°W

Muscle House or Muscle House by the Sea was a famous (in bodybuilding circles) boarding house on the beach. The building was owned by Fleurette Crettaz, aka "Joy" and was located at 1659 Ocean Front Walk, Santa Monica, California. Joy was a fan of bodybuilding and would let bodybuilders stay for minimal rent. The house operated from the 1950s to the 1970s. It was a common waypoint for up and coming bodybuilders such as Steve Reeves, Vince Edwards, Jack Delinger, George Eiferman and Dave Draper.
