= Tanny =

Tanny may refer to:

- Armand Tanny (1919–2009), a Muscle Beach bodybuilder
- Vic Tanny (c. 1912 – 1985), American entrepreneur, pioneer in the creation of the modern health club
- Tanny B. Crane (living), the president and CEO of Crane Group, chair of the board of directors for the Federal Reserve Bank of Cleveland
