= Toshisuke Kanazawa =

Japanese professional bodybuilder

Toshisuke Kanazawa (born September 1936) is a Japanese professional bodybuilder and former swimmer. He has been competing at Bodybuilding Masters Championships since the age of 50 and has won titles in Japanese Masters Bodybuilding Championships and in World Masters Bodybuilding Championships.

== Biography ==
Kanazawa was born in 1936 in Shimane Prefecture. He excelled in swimming when he was a youngster. He also once dreamed of representing Japan at the Olympics in swimming events. He progressed in the 1500m freestyle swimming when he was studying at the high school. However, his swimming hopes were dashed due to persistent muscular issues.

He eventually switched to bodybuilding and focused on maintaining fitness levels required to be a competent bodybuilder at international level. He spent five consecutive years by engaging in training schedule for bodybuilding which consisted of at least six hours of workout sessions per day and he also consumed at least six protein shakes per day. He relied heavily on the home-made food prepared by his mother which included simple meals. He also worked as a delivery boy as a part-time job, delivering electric appliances and with the earnings obtained from his part-time job, he spent them for his food expenses preferring cheese and milk.

== Career ==
He won his first Mister Japan title at the age of 24, as he also eventually fulfilled the promise of winning national bodybuilding title to his parents. He won his second Mister Japan title, at the age of 27, three years after winning his maiden Mister Japan title. Kanazawa competed at the 1967 Mr. Universe (Mr. Olympiad) competition in Montreal, where world renowned bodybuilder Arnold Schwarzenegger and the eventual title winner Sergio Oliva were also listed as two of the competitors during that competition. Kanazawa secured fourth position at the 1967 Mr Universe competition. He had secured the Mr. Japan title twice before announcing his retirement from competitive bodybuilding in his mid 30s.

He initially retired from bodybuilding at the age of 34, but he made a comeback return to the bodybuilding arena at the age of 50 after nearly a two decade hiatus. He returned to competitive bodybuilding at the age of 50 with the hopes of reviving his wife's confidence levels as his wife was suffering from severe chronic illness. Since the age of 80, Kanazawa has won the World Masters Bodybuilding Championships on six occasions. Kanazawa started focusing on having strict diet plan preferably vegetarian diet, ever since he made his return to bodybuilding at the age of 50. His meals would include brown rice with some furikake, natto and miso soup while also mixing it with raw eggs and protein supplements. He also quit eating both fish and meat as part of his strict diet plan, while also maintaining the habit of never having consumed alcohol and never having smoked cigarettes. Due to age restrictions, he had stopped doing squats and bench presses.

In September 2026, he won his 19th national title at the All Japan Masters Fitness Championship in the 85-and-over category and he won the title the day after his 90th birthday.
