= Anibal Lopez =

Puerto Rican bodybuilder

- Born: August 24, 1942 (age 83); Río Piedras, Puerto Rico
- Occupation: Bodybuilder

Anibal Lopez (born August 24, 1942) is an American bodybuilder. He was born in Río Piedras, Puerto Rico, to Francisco and Francisca Lopez. His family relocated to Bronx, New York, in 1954 where he attended Public School 66, Herman Ridder Junior High School (Public School 98), and Christopher Columbus High School (Bronx).

== Early life and interest in bodybuilding ==
As a boy, Anibal was fascinated with men of muscular power who could perform feats of strength. He read about Tarzan’s adventures in the comic books and watched former Olympic swimmer Johnny Weissmuller play the character in the movie series. The first sport young Lopez participated in was gymnastics. He continued to be drawn to “Strongmen”. His first glimpse of a bodybuilding icon was of Steve Reeves playing Hercules on the silver screen. Lopez would later recall, “That was when the bodybuilding ‘bug’ really bit me.” Decades later, Reeves told Lopez that he considered him to be one of his favorite bodybuilders.

Another early motivation for Anibal was seeing a guest posing exhibition by IFBB Hall of Fame bodybuilder Leroy Colbert, yet another childhood hero that decades later would become a personal friend.

Lopez served in the United States Army with the 101st Airborne Division; He found that he loved the challenge of jumping out of an aircraft in flight. He later served with the 19th Special Forces Group (Airborne) in the National Guard and was credited with over 100 jumps, including 10 night jumps all from different aircraft.

The next sport that Lopez excelled at was boxing. It wasn’t long, however, before his passion for both weightlifting and bodybuilding began to overtake his other sporting activities. He began to train at home with a barbell, a pair of dumbbells that he ordered from a Joe Weider magazine for $19.95 and a homemade wood bench.

It was while living in the Throgsneck Projects in the Bronx that Lopez accelerated his weight training. He moved past using the meager equipment at home and started training at the sports center in the projects. It was at this time that he began to see impressive changes in his physique, both in size and strength. During this period of training at the Throgsneck center he won his first trophy in powerlifting.

== Career ==
Lopez joined the AAU and entered his first novice bodybuilding contest, the “Mr. Wagner”, named so because it was held at the Wagner Youth Center in Manhattan. To his great surprise, he won the over-all title at the show.

His goal after that first show was to win the Mr. New York City title, which is how he began his career as a professional bodybuilder.

Now retired from competitive bodybuilding, Lopez continues to train and stay active in the sport. He resides in Deltona, Florida.

== Contest history ==
1969

- Junior Mr America - AAU, 7th
- Junior Mr USA - AAU, Most Muscular, 3rd
- Mr USA - AAU, 6th

1970

- Mr America - AAU, 6th
- Mr America - AAU, Most Muscular, 10th
- Junior Mr America - AAU, 3rd
- Mr World - AAU, Short, 2nd

1971

- Mr America - AAU, 6th
- Mr East Coast - AAU, Winner
- Junior Mr America - AAU, 4th
- Junior Mr USA - AAU, 3rd
- Mr World - AAU, Short, 1st
- Mr World - AAU, 4th

1972

- Junior Mr America - AAU, 5th

1973

- Mr America - AAU, 3rd
- Junior Mr America - AAU, 3rd
- Junior Mr America - AAU, Most Muscular, 5th
- Junior Mr USA - AAU, 3rd
- Junior Mr USA - AAU, Most Muscular, 5th
- Mr USA - AAU, 3rd

1974

- Mr America - AAU, 8th

1975

- Mr America - AAU, 12th
- Mr America - AAU, Short, 3rd
- Mr USA - AAU, Most Muscular, 2nd
- Mr USA - AAU, 2nd
- Mr USA - IFBB, Short, 3rd

1976

- Pro Mr America - WBBG, 4th

1977

- Pro Mr America - WBBG, Short, 1st
- Pro Mr World - WBBG, Did not place

1978

- Pro Mr America - WBBG, Overall Winner
- Pro Mr America - WBBG, Short, 1st
- Natural Mr America - NBA, Professional, 3rd
- Mr Universe - NABBA, Short, 3rd
- Pro Mr World - WBBG, Winner

1979

- Night of Champions - IFBB, 10th

1980

- Pro Mr America - WBBG, Winner
- Grand Prix Miami - IFBB, 8th
- Grand Prix Pennsylvania - IFBB, 11th
- Night of Champions - IFBB, 14th
- Pro Mr World - WBBG, Winner

1981

- Night of Champions - IFBB, 14th

2013

- National Fitness Hall of Fame - Inductee

== See also ==
- List of male professional bodybuilders
