= 1969 Mr. Olympia =

Bodybuilding contest held in Brooklyn, New York

The 1969 Mr. Olympia contest was an IFBB professional bodybuilding competition held on September 13, 1969 at the Brooklyn Academy of Music in Brooklyn, New York. It was the 5th Mr. Olympia competition held.

== Results ==
Place	Prize	Name
1	$1,000	(Cuba) Sergio Oliva
2		(Austria) Arnold Schwarzenegger

== Contest ==
The 1969 contest was Arnold Schwarzenegger's first Mr. Olympia. The Mr. America and Mr. Universe contests were held at the same show, and Schwarzenegger entered the IFBB Mr. Universe as a warmup. Their finals and all of the Mr. Olympia judging took place in the evening, in front of a sold-out crowd of 2,100. The defending champion, Sergio Oliva, warmed up backstage under a large butcher's coat to hide his physique, and he won by four points to three.

== Notable events ==
- Sergio Oliva won his third consecutive title
- Arnold Schwarzenegger was defeated for the only time on a Mr. Olympia stage
- It was the first of four times Oliva and Schwarzenegger faced each other in a bodybuilding contest and the only one Oliva won.
- The contest concluded with what is considered the first posedown.
