= Brosmer =

Brosmer is a surname. Notable people with the surname include:

- Betty Brosmer (born 1929), American body builder
- Max Brosmer (born 2001), American football player
