= Reg Lewis (bodybuilder) =

American bodybuilder and actor (1936–2021)

- Professional bodybuilder
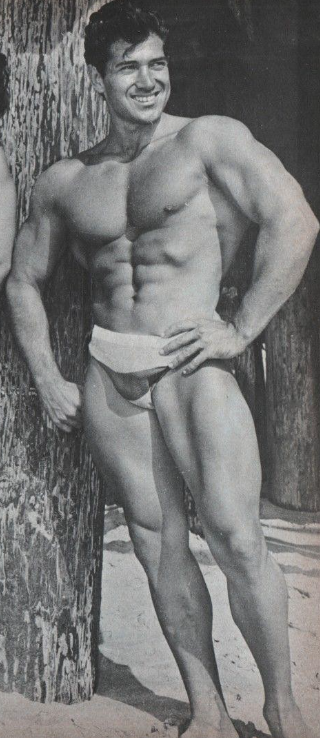

Personal info
- Full name: Reginald Bernie Lewis
- Born: January 23, 1936; Niles, California, U.S.
- Died: February 11, 2021 (aged 85); Los Angeles, California, U.S.

Best statistics
- Height: 6 ft 0 in (1.83 m)
- Weight: 220 lb (100 kg)

Professional (Pro) career
- Best win: Mr. America (1963)

Reginald Bernie Lewis (January 23, 1936 – February 11, 2021) was an American bodybuilder and actor.

== Biography ==
Lewis was born in Niles, California on January 23, 1936 to Roger Lewis and Agnes Almedia Lewis. In 1954, Lewis joined Mae West’s Revue as the youngest in her crew when he was 18.

Lewis won the overall title in the following bodybuilding competitions:

- 1955, Mr. California (AAU)
- 1956, Mr. Pacific Coast (AAU); 1963
- Mr. America (IFBB); 1982, Natural Mr. America—Masters (NBA).
- He placed third in the 1970 Mr. Olympia (IFBB).

He appeared as contestant with his wife, June, on a November 1959 episode of the television gameshow You Bet Your Life, with Groucho Marx.

In the 1960s and 1970s, Lewis appeared in several films, notably the Italian picture Fire Monsters Against the Son of Hercules (1962) in which he played the lead role alongside Margaret Lee. His last screen appearance was in Mae West's Sextette (1978).

Lewis died in Los Angeles on February 11, 2021, at the age of 85.

== Filmography ==
=== Film ===
- (1962) – Fire Monsters Against the Son of Hercules
- (1964) – The Brass Bottle
- (1967) – Don't Make Waves
- (1978) – Sextette

=== Television ===
- The Red Skelton Show [Episode: Goodness Had Nothing to Do with It with guest star Mae West (March 1, 1960)]
