= 1972 Mr. Olympia =

Bobybuilding competition

The 1972 Mr. Olympia contest was an IFBB professional bodybuilding competition held in October 1972 at the Handelshof in Essen, West Germany. It was the 8th Mr. Olympia competition held.

== Results ==
Place	Prize	Name
1	$2,000	(Austria) Arnold Schwarzenegger
2		(Cuba) Sergio Oliva
3		(France) Serge Nubret
4		(United States) Frank Zane
5		(Italy) Franco Columbu
6		(Poland) Edmund Karolewicz

== Notable events ==
- Arnold Schwarzenegger won his third consecutive Mr. Olympia title, tying the previous record held by Sergio Oliva
- The winner was decided by seven judges, with Arnold Schwarzenegger receiving five first place votes
