= Roy Hilligenn =

South African bodybuilder (1922–2008)

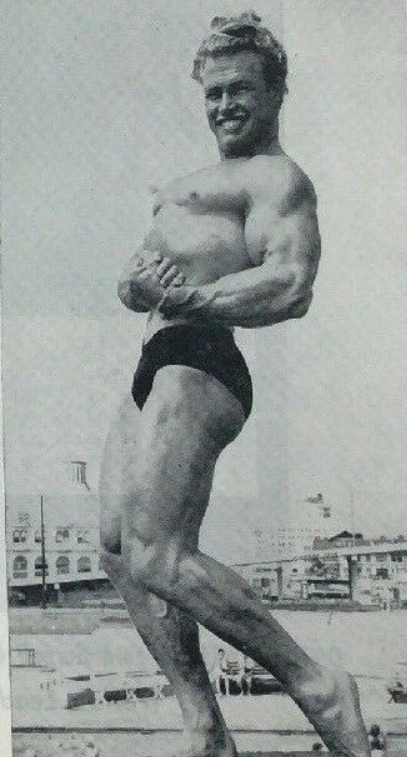
- Hilligenn in 1950
- Born: November 15, 1922; California
- Died: August 3, 2008 (aged 85)
- Occupations: Bodybuilder, masseur

Roy Stanley Hilligenn (November 15, 1922 – August 3, 2008) was an American bodybuilder who was awarded the title of Mr. South Africa for four years, as well as AAU Mr. America in 1951. Famous for his strength, vegetarianism, and smile, Hilligenn mixed bodybuilding and weight training in his fitness programs. He appeared on famous magazine covers such as Strength & Health and Iron Man during his bodybuilding career. Standing at only 5 ft 6 in (168 cm), Hilligenn was the shortest person to ever win the Mr. America title.

== Childhood ==
Roy Hilligenn, whose name was commonly misspelled as Hilligen in publications, was born in California and won a trophy for being a beautiful baby when he was only six months old. Soon after his birth, his family moved to South Africa, where he grew up. When Hilligenn was 4-years-old, his father died, and soon after, his mother placed him and his four siblings in an orphanage. He lived at the orphanage until the age of 15, after which he went to school to become an electrician. He had little interest in sports until the age of 17, when he fell four floors while working as an electrician. The injury included broken fingers, ribs, and wrist, all on his left side. After recovering, he began to weight train, weighing in at only 85 pounds, using a homemade set of weights given to him by a friend. Three years after his injury, Hilligenn began competing in novice weightlifting meets.

== Training and competitions ==
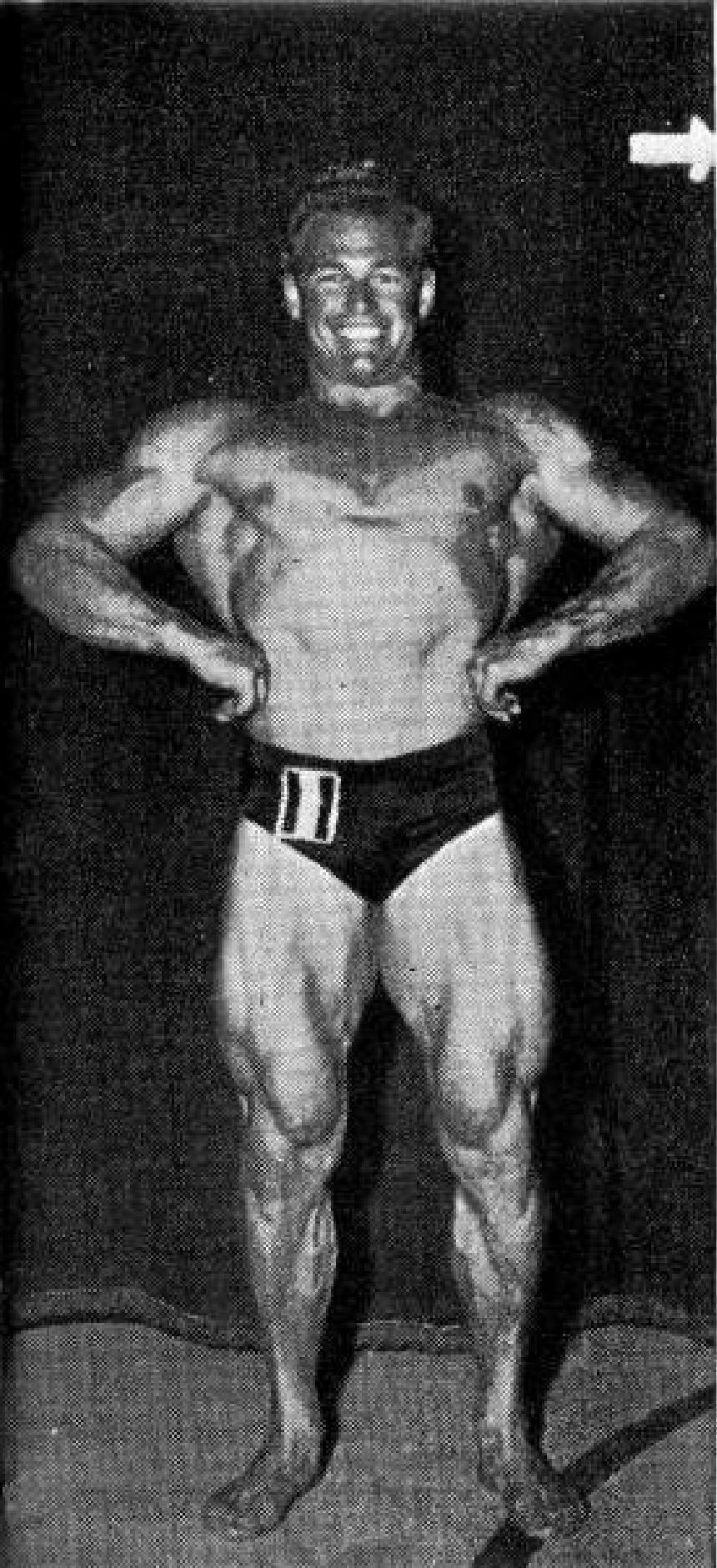
Hilligenn at the 1952 Mr. World competition, where he placed second.

Hilligenn won his 1st place title in a novice weightlifting meet in 1943. He was in the 148-pound weight class and performed a 160 press, 160 snatch, and 240 clean and jerk. He went on to win the Mr. South Africa title in 1943, 1944, 1946, and 1976 (at the age of 54).

In 1951 Hilligenn began training for the Mr. America competition under Ed Yarick in Oakland, who had worked with former Mr. Americas (including Steve Reeves in 1947 and Jack Delinger in 1949). The Yarick Gym included both bodybuilding training and weight-lifting, and Hilligenn spent two months training with Yarick as well as living in Yarick's home and with his wife Alice. During the months before the Mr. America competition, Hilligenn was training six days a week, with three days dedicated to bodybuilding and three days dedicated to Olympic lifts, and often including two training sessions a day. With the help of Yarick's training, he went on to win the 1951 Mr. America competition. In the 1950s, while Hilligenn was winning the most titles, his body weight fluctuated between 175 and 185 pounds.

=== List of competitions ===
Year	Competition/Award	Placement
1943	Mr. South Africa	1st place
1944	Mr. South Africa	1st place
1946	Mr. South Africa	1st place
1949	Mr. California	3rd place
1949	Mr. Northern California	1st place
1949	Mr. Pacific Coast	1st place
1950	Mr. America	3rd place behind John Farbotnik and Melvin Wells
1950	Pacific Coast weightlifting championship	1st place
1951	Mr. America	1st place
1951	National Championships	2nd place behind Norbert Schemansky
1952	Jr. National Championship	1st place
1952	World's Most Muscular Man	1st place
1952	Mr. World	2nd place behind Jim Park
1976	Mr. South Africa	1st place

=== Personal records while training ===
Lift	Weight
Press	280 lb
Snatch	264 lb
Clean and jerk	410 lb
Squat	510 lb

Photos of Hilligenn performing a 500 lb one-arm deadlift.

== Sexual battery convictions ==
Hilligenn who had worked as a masseur at his Hernando County clinic was convicted of sexually assaulting two of his female clients. He was also hired as a personal trainer for a St. Petersburg family and was accused of fondling a 21-year-old female member of the family. Between 1987 and 1989, Hilligenn served two years in prison on two accounts of sexual battery and three accounts of assault. In 1991, Hilligenn was convicted of sexual battery and sentenced to 10 years in prison. He was released in 1999.

== Personal life ==
Hilligenn was a vegetarian, claiming not to have eaten meat. He stated that "I believe being a vegetarian all my life is a secret to [my] youthful countenance and longevity and perfect health."

Hilligenn married Marilyn Hilligenn in the early 1960s. He died on August 3, 2008, at the age of 85. He developed a blood clot after he fell and hit his head. After undergoing surgery to relieve pressure on his brain, he went into a coma and never came out of it.
