= Betty Brosmer =

American model and fitness advocate

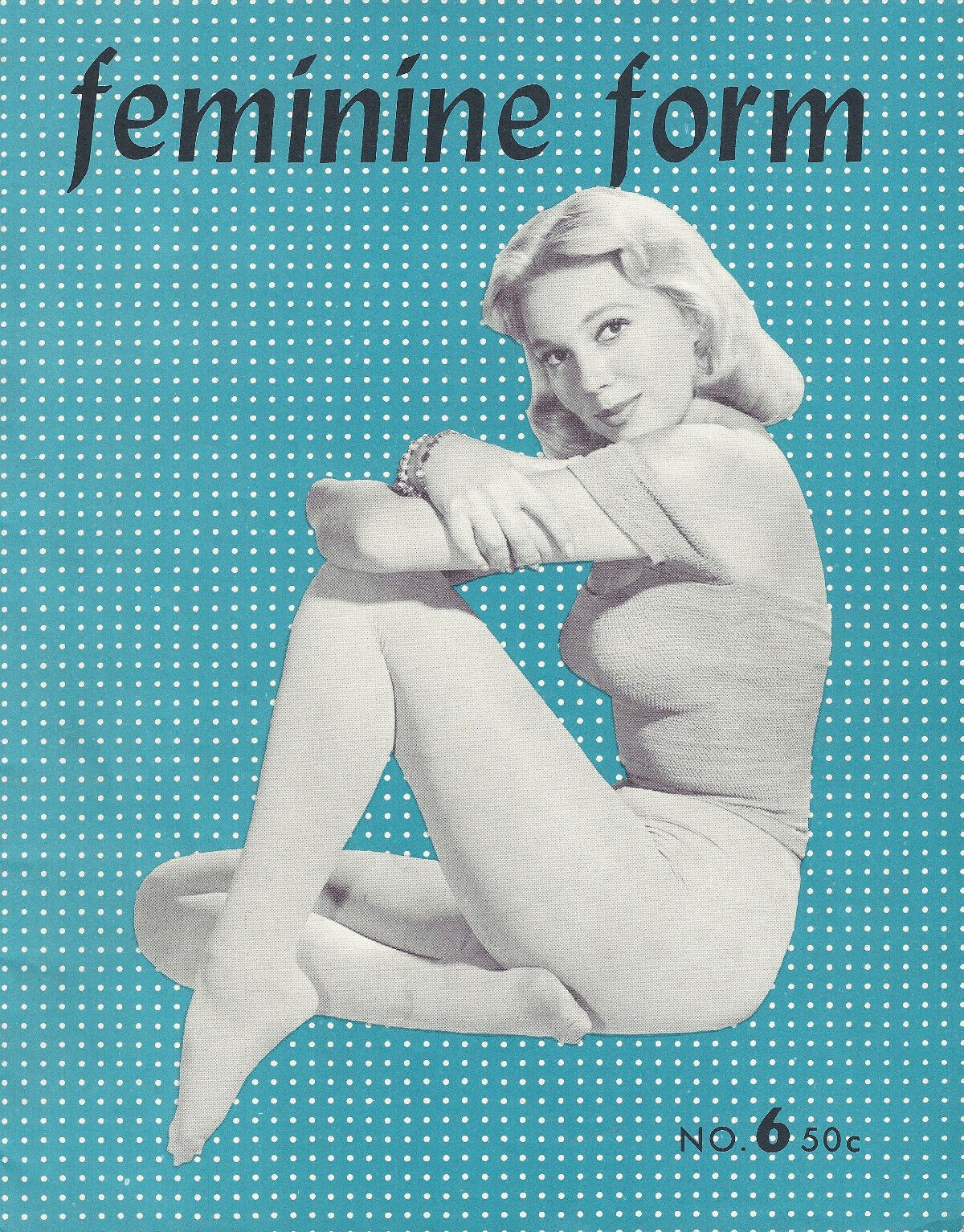
- Brosmer on the cover of Feminine Form magazine #6, 1959
- Born: Betty Chloe Brosemer; August 6, 1929 (age 97); Pasadena, California, U.S.
- Other name: Betty Weider
- Occupations: Model; fitness trainer; author; speaker
- Height: 5 ft 5 in (1.65 m)
- Spouse: Joe Weider (m. 1961; died 2013)
- Website: www.bettyweider.com

Betty Brosmer (born Betty Chloe Brosemer; August 6, 1929) (Note: later known by her married name Betty Weider) is an American former bodybuilder and physical fitness expert. During the 1950s, she was a popular commercial model and pin-up girl.

After marrying magazine publisher Joe Weider on April 24, 1961, she began a lengthy career as a spokesperson and trainer in the health and bodybuilding movements. She has been a longtime magazine columnist and co-authored several books on fitness and physical exercise.

In 2014, she was inducted into the International Sports Hall of Fame along with Joe and Ben Weider.

== Early life ==
Brosmer was born in Pasadena, California, on August 6, 1929, to Andrew Brosemer and Vendla Alvaria Pippenger.

She lived her early childhood in Carmel but later, from about the age of ten, grew up in Los Angeles. Small and slight of frame, Brosmer embarked on a personal bodybuilding and weight training regimen before she was a teenager. Raised as a sports fan by her father, she excelled in youth athletics and was "something of a tomboy".

A photo of Brosmer appeared in the Sears & Roebuck catalog when she was 13 years old. The following year she visited New York City with her aunt and posed for pictures with a professional photographic studio; one of her photos was sold to Emerson Televisions for use in commercial advertising, and it became a widely used promotional piece, printed in national magazines for several years thereafter.

== Modeling career ==
Brosmer returned to Los Angeles and was soon asked to pose for two of the most celebrated pin-up artists of the era, Alberto Vargas and Earl Moran. Encouraged, her aunt took her back to New York City again in 1950, and this time they took up residency. Brosmer built her photographic portfolio while attending George Washington High School in Manhattan. Despite her age, over the next four years Brosmer found frequent work as a commercial model, and graced the covers of many of the ubiquitous postwar "pulps": popular romance and crime magazines and books. As she explained, "When I was 15, I was made up to look like I was about 25".

Some of her most famous photo work during this period include glamour appearances in Picture Show (December 1950, cover); People Today (July 1954, centerspread); Photo (January 1955); and Modern Man (February 1955; May 1955). She was also employed as a fashion model, and in 1954 posed for Christian Dior.

She won numerous New York area beauty contests in the early 1950s, most famously "Miss Television"; in that capacity she appeared in TV Guide, as well as on the widely seen programs of Steve Allen, Milton Berle, Jackie Gleason and others. Her fame had grown so much by the age of eighteen that when she left New York and returned to California – this time to Hollywood – her departure was noted in the celebrity column of Walter Winchell.

Back on the West Coast, Brosmer maintained a busy freelance workload in fashion and commercial modeling, while at the same time continuing her education, majoring in psychology at UCLA. She also entered into a lucrative contract with the glamour photographer Keith Bernard, and she worked steadily with him for the rest of the decade. For Bernard, a well-established photographer who had worked with Marilyn Monroe and Jayne Mansfield, Brosmer would prove to be the top-selling pin-up model of his career. Brosmer's publication work during the late 1950s includes appearances in Modern Man (October 1956, cover); Photoplay (April 1958, cover); and Rogue (July 1958 and February 1959, covers). During this time, Brosmer was said to be the highest paid pin-up model in the United States – she was seen in "virtually every men's magazine of the era".

Playboy magazine pursued Brosmer for an exclusive pictorial, and a photo shoot was set up in Beverly Hills. The resulting picture set was rejected, however, after Brosmer declined to do any nude posing: "I wore sort of a half-bra or low demi-bra with nothing showing ... and that's what I thought they wanted." Playboy threatened a lawsuit over the alleged breach of contract, but ultimately relinquished the case. The photos were eventually sold to Escapade magazine and published in its anthology issue Escapade's Choicest #3 (1959). Brosmer never did any nude or semi-nude modeling throughout her long career: as she explained later in life, "I didn't think it was immoral, but I just didn't want to cause problems for others ... I thought it would embarrass my future husband and my family".

That future husband would turn out to be bodybuilding enthusiast and magazine publisher Joe Weider, who had first become aware of Brosmer through his contact with Keith Bernard for fitness models. Brosmer's first photos for a Weider magazine appeared as a four-page layout in Figure & Beauty in December 1956. After that, Weider regularly sought out her work among Bernard's submissions. She was known to be his favorite model and he requested her more and more frequently after their first face-to-face meeting in 1959.

The two grew close due to their mutual professional and personal interests in fitness and psychology, and they were married on April 24, 1961. The marriage was Joe Weider's second, and he had one daughter from his previous wife; he and Brosmer had no children together. Their marriage would last over fifty years, until Joe Weider's death in 2013 at the age of 93.

== Fitness career ==
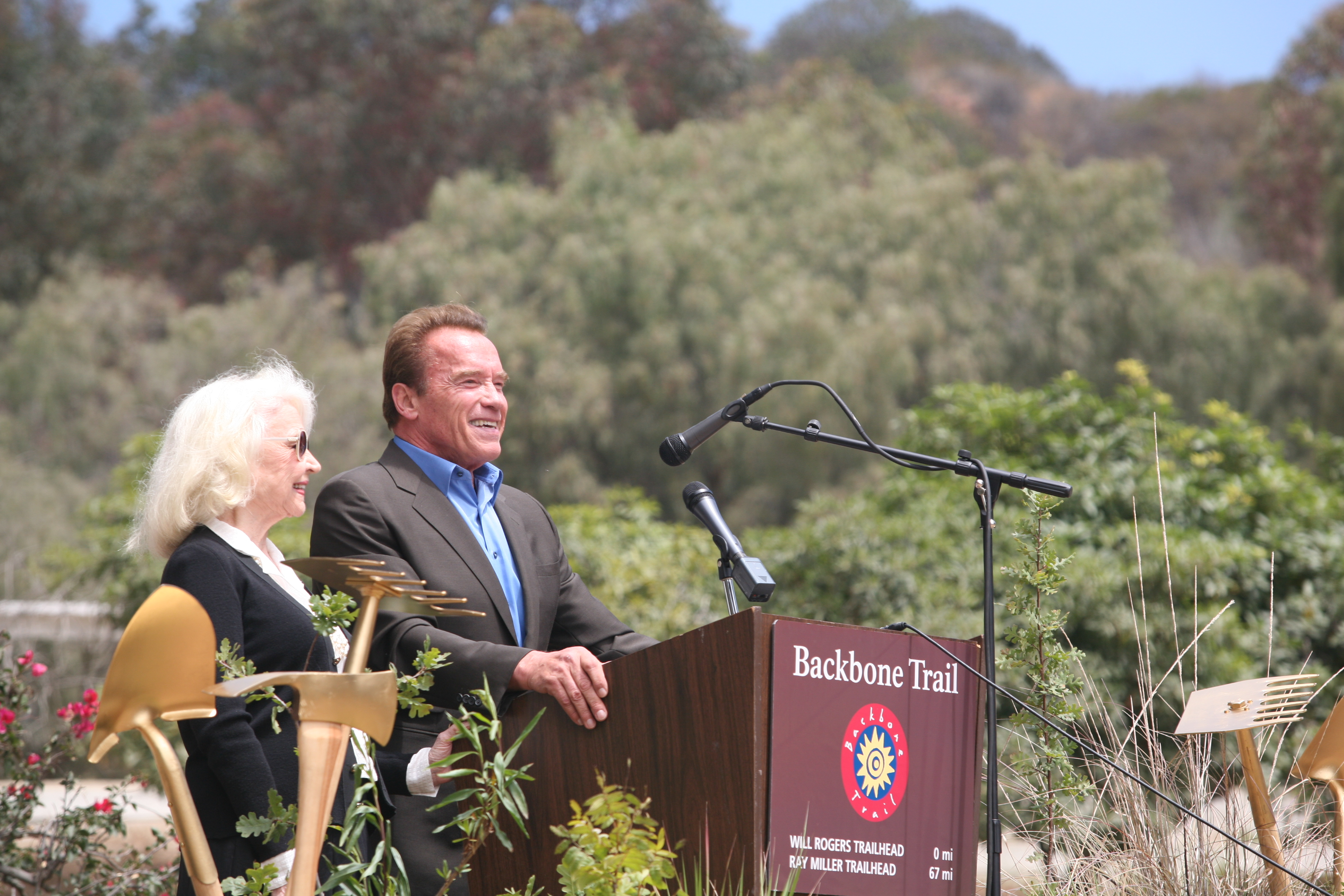
Betty Weider and Arnold Schwarzenegger in 2016

After marriage, Brosmer (now known as Betty Weider) ceased posing as a pin-up, but she continued to be frequently photographed. For many years she was seen routinely in Weider publications helping to advertise a wide range of fitness products. She remained a highly visible presence among the various magazines, and was continuously included in their editorial photo work as well. Throughout the 1960s and 1970s, she appeared in many pictorial layouts, and also often on the covers of Weider titles like Jem, Vigor, and Muscle Builder. Her later cover appearances were often paired with champion bodybuilders of the day, such as Arnold Schwarzenegger, Dave Draper, Frank Zane, Mike Mentzer, and Robby Robinson; her final cover shot was on Muscle and Fitness in May 1988, with Larry Scott.

Under her marital name Betty Weider, she served as a regular contributing writer for Muscle and Fitness for over three decades. As her writing style developed, she focused on her own monthly M&F columns, "Body by Betty" and "Health by Betty". She also worked as associate editor for the female-oriented Weider magazine, Shape.

With her husband, she authored two book-length fitness guides, The Weider Book of Bodybuilding for Women (1981) and The Weider Body Book (1984). With Joyce Vedral, she designed an all-ages workout regimen for women, published in 1993 as Better and Better.

In 2004, the Weiders donated $1 million to the University of Texas at Austin to support the physical culture collection of the H.J. Lutcher Stark Center for Physical Culture and Sports. The gift was key to the Stark Center's establishment of a permanent exhibition space, now known as the Joe and Betty Weider Museum of Physical Culture. The museum holds hundreds of items in its 10,000-square-foot gallery space, and was opened to the public in August 2011.

== In popular culture ==
In The Dirty Dozen (1967), pin-ups of Brosmer can be seen on the walls of the MP barracks. Posters of her are also seen hanging on gym walls in the documentary Pumping Iron (1977), and she makes a walk-on appearance as an audience member at a bodybuilding competition in Pumping Iron II: The Women (1985). She is portrayed by actress Julianne Hough in the Weider family biopic Bigger (2018).

== Works ==
- Weider, Betty; Weider, Joe (1981). The Weider Book of Bodybuilding for Women. Chicago: Contemporary Books. ISBN 0809259060.
- Weider, Betty; Weider, Joe (1984). The Weider Body Book. Chicago: Contemporary Books. ISBN 978-0809254293.
- Weider, Betty; Vedral, Joyce L. (1993). Better and Better: Six Weeks to a Great Shape at Any Age. New York: Dell. ISBN 0440503132.
