= Bob Gajda =

American bodybuilder (1940–2022)

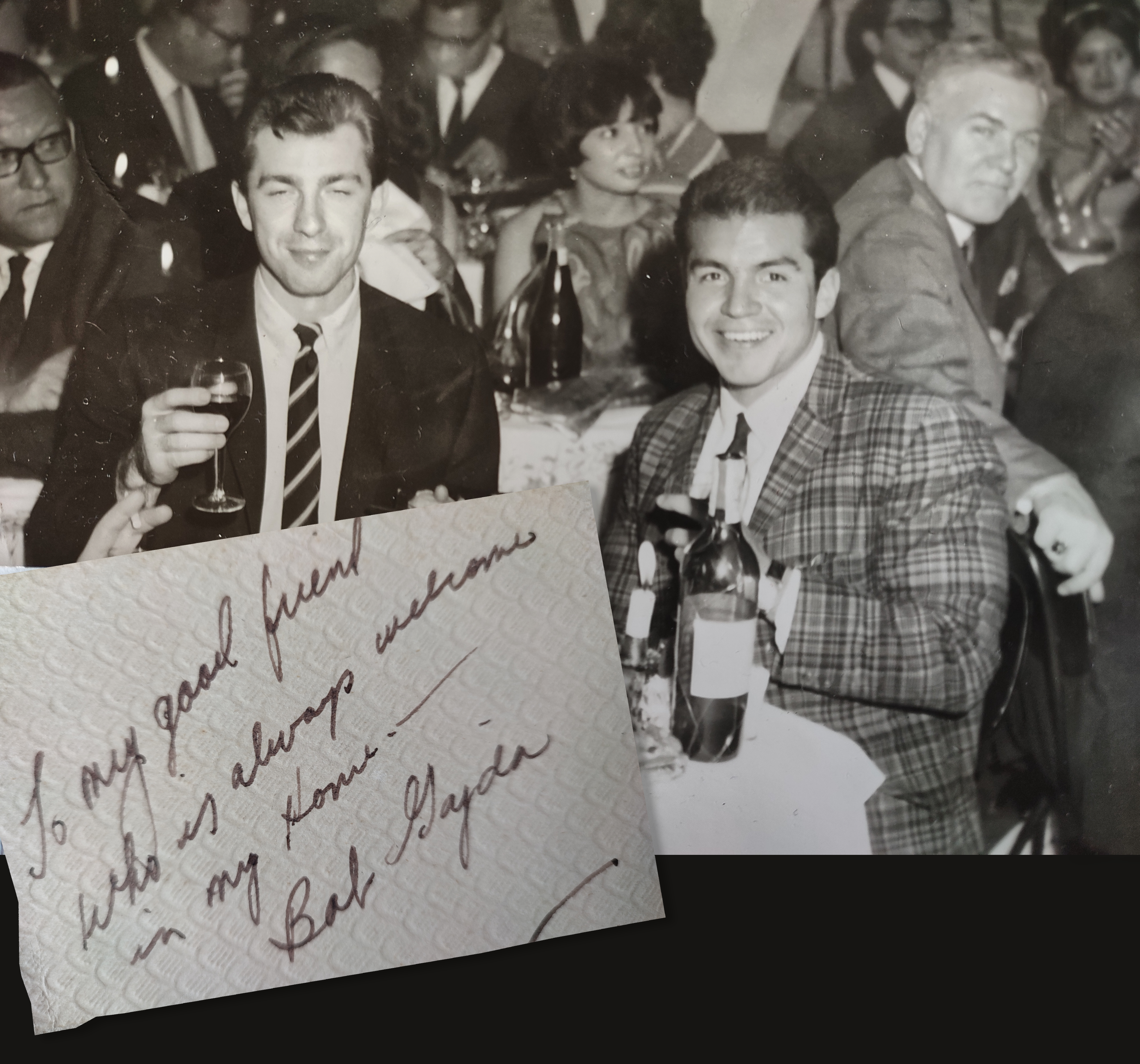
- Bob Gajda Mr. América 1966 y Humberto Garcia Mr. México 1964 en Ciudad de México, en el Restaurante Gitanerías
- Born: September 14, 1940
- Died: January 16, 2022 (aged 81)

Robert Steven Gajda (September 14, 1940 – January 16, 2022) was an American bodybuilder and performance training pioneer.

== Life and career ==
Gajda was born in Chicago, Illinois on September 14, 1940.

He held the title of AAU Mr. America, which he won in 1966, after defeating his training partner and friend, Sergio Oliva for the title. He also placed first in the 1966 FICH Mr. Universe.

Gajda developed Chicago's Duncan YMCA gym, which was known as "the muscle factory on West Monroe", and played a major role in establishing the Chicago bodybuilding scene.

He died on January 16, 2022, at the age of 81.

== Awards ==
- AOBS Hall of Fame
