= 1970 Mr. Olympia =

Professional bodybuilding competition

The 1970 Mr. Olympia contest was an IFBB professional bodybuilding competition held in September 1970 at The Town Hall in New York City, New York. It was the 6th Mr. Olympia competition held.

== Results ==
Place	Prize	Name
1	$1,000	(Austria) Arnold Schwarzenegger
2		(Cuba) Sergio Oliva
3		(United States) Reg Lewis
