= Ms. America (contest) =

The Ms. America competition is one of professional bodybuilding's most prestigious competitions and the title of the winner of the competition in female bodybuilding. The male professional bodybuilding equivalent of the Ms. America is the Mr. America. It is held annually in conjunction with the Mr. America Expo.

== Champions ==
| Year | Federation | Ms. America | Venue |
|---|---|---|---|
| 1980 | Amateur Athletic Union | Carla Dunlap | |
| 1981 | Amateur Athletic Union | Laura Combes | |
| 1982 | Amateur Athletic Union | Tina Plakinger (medium & overall) Chris Wood (Tall) Rebecca Thomas (medium-tall) Gloria Romo (short) | |
| 1983 | Amateur Athletic Union | Kerrie Keenan (medium & overall) Cheryl Harris (Tall) Becky Thomas (medium-tall) Diane Langone (short) | |
| 1984 | Amateur Athletic Union | Jill O'Connor (medium & overall) Dawn Goldstab (Tall) Cynthia Albrecht (medium-tall) Joone Hopfenspirger (short) | |
| 1985 | Amateur Athletic Union | Joone Hopfenspirger (short & overall) Christine Engle (Tall) Debra Poston (medium-tall) Cathey Palyo (medium) | |
| 1986 | Amateur Athletic Union | Connie McCloskey (short & overall) Teresa Nordaby (Tall) Cathy Butler (medium) | |
| 1987 | Amateur Athletic Union | Teresa Nordaby (medium-Tall & overall) Gretta Mikalac (Tall) Cathy Butler (medium) Linda Lawrynkiewicz (short) | |
| 1988 | Amateur Athletic Union | Cathy Butler (short & overall) Anita Briggs (Tall) Antoinette Winn (medium-tall) Theresa Locicero (medium) | |
| 1989 | Amateur Athletic Union | Mary Adams | |
| 1990 | Amateur Athletic Union | Linda Slayton (short & overall) Anita Briggs (Tall) Tammy Kamienski (medium-tall) Theresa Locicero (medium) | |
| 1991 | Amateur Athletic Union | Theresa Locicero (medium & overall) Jodie Adams (Tall) Donna Marie Schultz (medium-tall) Gayle Schroeder (short) | |
| 1992 | Amateur Athletic Union | Kathi Costello (medium & overall) Betsy Briggs (Tall) Linda Mignosa (medium-tall) Laurie Fierstein (short) | |
| 1993 | Amateur Athletic Union | Karla Nelsen (tall & overall) Christine Gillett (medium-tall) Bonnie Chymeryc (medium) Jeannie Davidson (short) | |
| 1994 | Amateur Athletic Union | Midge Shull (short & overall) Betsy Briggs (Tall) | |
| 1995 | Amateur Athletic Union | Betsy Briggs (heavyweight & overall) Vicki Dunn (middleweight) Victoria McKinney (lightweight) | |
| 1996 | Amateur Athletic Union | Cynthia Barker (heavyweight & overall) Sonyo T Bond (middleweight) Johanna Carter (lightweight) | |
| 1997 | Amateur Athletic Union | Denise Richardson (heavyweight & overall) Beth Eisenman (middleweight) Mary Martino (lightweight) | |
| 1998 | Amateur Athletic Union | Denise Richardson (middleweight & overall) Kimberly Rogers (heavyweight) Ann Katz (Light-Heavyweight) Denise Richardson (middleweight) Mary Martino (lightweight) | |
| 1999 | Amateur Athletic Union | Cathy Boulé (medium & overall) Donna Shultz (Tall) Melody Leese (short) | |
| 2011 | International Natural Bodybuilding Federation | None (Overall) Julie Sleight (heavyweight) Cynthia Mustafa (lightweight) Julie Sleight (Masters) | |
| 2022 | None | Melody Farkas | Atlantic City, New Jersey, United States of America |
| 2023 | None | TBD | Atlantic City, New Jersey, United States of America |

== See also ==
- Mr. America (the male equivalent)
- List of professional bodybuilding competitions
