= Jem (magazine) =

American men's magazine

Jem was a magazine founded by Joe Weider in the 1950s as entertainment for heterosexual men. The first issue was released in November 1956, featuring Candy Barr on the cover. The monthly periodical was encouraged by American News distributors, which asked Weider to start a competitor publication to rival the success Hugh Hefner had achieved with Playboy. Jem published photos of topless models and featured articles about dining, nightlife, and wine. Its companion magazine was Monsieur. Jem was quickly successful, although Weider says that he was never very interested in its viability.

A number of Jem issues feature Weider's wife, model Betty Brosmer, on their covers.

The February 1960 issue of Jem featured fiction, humor, article, and models. Gypsy Rose Lee was the feature interview. Fiction pieces were titled "The Girl From Denmark", "The Nude On The Beach", and "This Guy". The magazine ceased publication in 1968.

The magazine is referenced in Stephen King's novel It, where Richie Tozier peeks at "the half-undressed girls" in his father's magazines. In the book, it is called Gem.
