= Harold Poole =

American bodybuilder (1943–2014)

Personal information
- Born: December 25, 1943 Louisville, Kentucky, U.S.
- Died: July 7, 2014 (aged 70) New York City, New York, U.S.
- Home town: Indianapolis
- Education: Shortridge High School
- Years active: 1960–1982
- Height: 5 ft 10 in (178 cm)
- Weight: 225 lb (102 kg; 16 st 1 lb)

Sport
- Sport: Bodybuilding
- Turned pro: 1960

Achievements and titles
- Highest world ranking: 2 (1965 & 1966, Mr. Olympia)

Harold Poole (December 25, 1943 – August 7, 2014) was an AAU, IFBB and WBBG professional bodybuilder.

== Early life ==
Born in Louisville, Kentucky Poole's athleticism was apparent very early on. He was quarterback on his football team at Shortridge High School in Indianapolis, placed fourth in the state high school wrestling championships, ran 440 yards in 50 seconds and put the 12 pound shot 55 feet. His high school history teacher, Loren J. Comstock, was a bodybuilder who had won state championships himself, and helped organize a local bodybuilding gym.

When Poole was 14 years old, his father died. He began bodybuilding from a young age and worked both manual labor jobs and figure modeling at the Herron School of Art and Design. As a teen, he had been too poor to afford exercise equipment or a gym membership, and he started his bodybuilding journey by improvising workouts with his brother. By age 18, he had already reached 200 lbs.

== Career ==
In 1960, Poole entered the AAU Mr. America and, at the age of 16, took 18th place. His final AAU teen opportunity came in June 1963, where he won most muscular, but was the runner-up to Vern Weaver. Three months later, Poole switched to the IFBB and, at age 19, he won the Mr. Universe. In 1964, he became the first African-American to be named IFBB Mr. America. Starting in 1965, Poole became the only man to compete in the first three Mr. Olympia contests finishing runner-up to Larry Scott in the first two Olympias. He is the youngest ever Mr. Olympia competitor; he was only 21 when he competed in the 1965 Mr. Olympia. He is noted for first popularizing the most muscular pose.

Harold was an active businessman operating a gym and discothèque. He was also a bodyguard for fashion model Twiggy, travelling across North & South America as well as the UK with her.

== Legacy and death ==
He retired from bodybuilding competition following the 1982 IFBB Night Of Champions, where he placed outside the top 10. He lived in Florida, where he continued to train with weights and practice martial arts until the end of 2010, when he moved to New York City. He was inducted to the IFBB Hall of Fame in 2004 and the WBBG Hall of Fame in 2007. In 2008, Poole was voted the Greatest Teenage Bodybuilder of All-Time.

Harold Poole died in New York City on August 7, 2014.

== Competition and award history ==
1960

- Mr America - AAU, 18th
- Mr Mid-America - AAU, Most Muscular, 2nd

1961

- Mr. Indiana, 1st
- Mr America - AAU, 4th
- Junior Mr America - AAU, Overall Winner

1962

- Mr America - AAU, Most Muscular, 1st
- Mr America - AAU, 2nd
- Mr North America - AAU, Winner

1963

- Mr America - AAU, Most Muscular, 1st
- Mr America - AAU, 2nd
- Teen Mr America - AAU, 2nd
- Universe - IFBB, Tall, 1st
- Universe - IFBB, Overall Winner

1964

- Mr America - IFBB, Tall, 1st
- Mr America - IFBB, Overall Winner

1965

- Mr. Olympia - IFBB, 2nd

1966

- Mr. Olympia - IFBB, 2nd

1967

- Pro Mr America - WBBG, Winner
- Mr. Olympia - IFBB, 2nd

1968

- Pro Mr America - WBBG, Winner

1971

- Mr USA - IFBB, Tall, 1st

1972

- Mr World - IFBB, Tall, 3rd

1980

- Night of Champions - IFBB, 12th

1981

- Grand Prix California - IFBB, 7th
- Grand Prix New England - IFBB, 9th
- Night of Champions - IFBB, 6th
- Canada Pro Cup - IFBB, 8th

1982

- World Pro Championships - IFBB, 9th

2004

- IFBB Hall of Fame

2007

- WBBG Hall of Fame

== See also ==
- List of male professional bodybuilders
- List of female professional bodybuilders

== Sources ==
- Comstock, Loren. (August, 1962). "Introducing Harold Poole". Strength & Health
