= 1967 Mr. Olympia =

Professional bodybuilding competition

The 1967 Mr. Olympia contest was an IFBB professional bodybuilding competition held in September 16, 1967 at the Brooklyn Academy of Music in Brooklyn, New York. It was the 3rd Mr. Olympia competition held. Only the winner was announced, but Harold Poole originally won on scorecards before the contest was re-judged at the last moment.

== Results ==
Place	Prize	Name
1	$1,000	(Cuba) Sergio Oliva
2		(United States) Harold Poole
3		(United States) Chuck Sipes
4		(United States) Dave Draper

== Notable events ==
- Sergio Oliva wins the title, becoming the second Mr. Olympia
