= Gaétan D'Amours =

Canadian bodybuilder

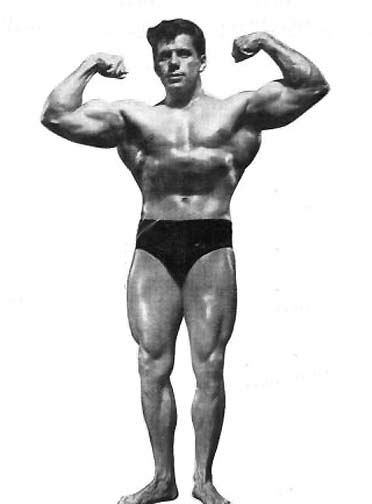
Gaétan D'Amours

Gaétan D'Amours (1933 – April 25, 2007) was awarded the title of Mr. Québec in 1960, Mr. World Canada in 1961, Mr. America also in 1961, and a 5th place as Mr. Universe in 1967. In 1997, he received the gold medal presented by Ben Weider, president of the IFBB (International Association of BodyBuilders) for his major contributions to the bodybuilder movement and physical fitness of the Quebec youth. He had a bodybuilding studio for 50 years where he was a professor of physical education. He was also a believer in the Ben Weider food supplement products.

He died April 25, 2007, at the age of 74.
