= 1966 Mr. Olympia =

Bodybuilding competition

The 1966 Mr. Olympia contest was an IFBB professional bodybuilding competition held on September 17, 1966 at the Brooklyn Academy of Music in Brooklyn, New York. It was the 2nd Mr. Olympia competition held and the first with a cash prize ($1000).

== Results ==
Place	Prize	Name
1	$1,000	(United States) Larry Scott
		(United States) Harold Poole
		(United States) Chuck Sipes
		(Cuba) Sergio Oliva

== Notable events ==
- Larry Scott wins Mr. Olympia for a second time, and announces his retirement from bodybuilding. (He made a brief comeback in 1979.)
- Only the winner was determined. Scott won unanimously.
