= Sergio Oliva =

Cuban bodybuilder (1941–2012)

- Professional bodybuilder

Personal info
- Nickname: The Myth
- Born: July 4, 1941; Pinar del Río, Cuba
- Died: November 12, 2012 (aged 71); Chicago, Illinois, U.S.

Best statistics
- Height: 5 ft 10 in (1.78 m)
- Weight: Contest: 225 lb (102 kg); Off season: 235 lb (107 kg)

Professional (Pro) career
- Pro-debut: Mr. World; 1966
- Best win: IFBB Mr. Olympia, 1967-1969
- Predecessor: Larry Scott
- Successor: Arnold Schwarzenegger
- Active: 1962–1985

Sergio Oliva (Spanish pronunciation: [ˈseɾxjo oˈliβa]; July 4, 1941 – November 12, 2012), often known by his epithet 'The Myth' for his physique and performance, was a Cuban American bodybuilder and three-time Mr. Olympia winner.

== Early life ==
Sergio Oliva was born on July 4, 1941, in Guantanamo, Cuba, during the presidency of Fulgencio Batista. As a teenager, Sergio was able to perform clean & jerks above 400 pounds. He was selected to represent Cuba at the 1962 Central America and Caribbean Games. While representing Cuba in Jamaica, he successfully claimed political asylum in the United States. Soon after, 65 other Cuban nationals, which included Castro's entire weightlifting team and their security guards, followed Oliva by seeking asylum in the US. In the United States Oliva lived in Miami, Florida, where he worked as a TV repairman.

== Career ==
Oliva won the Mr. Olympia title three years from 1967 to 1969 in a row. He competed at a contest weight of 225–245 lbs. His second title in 1968 was uncontested. In 1969, he won his third consecutive Mr. Olympia by beating four-time Mr. Universe winner Arnold Schwarzenegger.

Oliva was banned from competing in the 1971 IFBB Mr. Olympia competition due to the fact that he competed in the 1971 NABBA Mr. Universe, allowing Schwarzenegger to claim the title. In 1972, Oliva challenged Schwarzenegger again for the year's Olympia in Essen, West Germany. However, he again placed second behind Schwarzenegger.

In 1985, Oliva returned for a final attempt at the Mr. Olympia title. He finished this year in 8th place - repeating his position from the previous year.

== Personal life ==
- Oliva was a police officer in Chicago from 1976 to 2003.
- In 1986, Sergio survived being shot by his then-wife Arleen Garrett. He sustained five bullet wounds to his abdomen from a .38 Special handgun.
- His son, Sergio Oliva Jr., is an IFBB Pro bodybuilder who won the 2015 NPC Nationals bodybuilding competition, and who has since competed on Mr. Olympia, Arnold Classic, and New York Pro stages.

== Death ==
Sergio Oliva died on November 12, 2012, in Chicago, Illinois, from apparent kidney failure.

== Bodybuilding titles ==
Year	Level	Title/Organization	Overall Position	Notes
1963	City	Mr. Chicago	1st	
1964	State	Mr. Illinois	1st	
1964	National	Mr. America / AAU	7th	
1965	National	Junior Mr. America / AAU	2nd	“Most Muscular” Trophy
1965	National	Mr. America / AAU	4th	“Most Muscular” Trophy
1966	National	Junior Mr. America / AAU	1st	“Most Muscular” Trophy
1966	National	Mr. America / AAU	2nd	“Most Muscular” Trophy
1966	International	Mr. World / IFBB	1st	1st in the “Tall” Category
1966	International	Mr. Universe / IFBB	1st	
1966	International	Mr. Olympia / IFBB	4th	
1967	International	Mr. Olympia / IFBB	1st	
1967	International	Mr. Universe / IFBB	1st	
1968	International	Mr. Olympia / IFBB	1st	Second Consecutive Win; Uncontested & Unchallenged
1969	International	Mr. Olympia / IFBB	1st	Third Consecutive Win
1970	International	Mr. World / AAU (Pro)	-	2nd in the “Tall” Category
1970	International	Mr. Olympia / IFBB	2nd	
1971	International	Mr. Universe / NABBA (Pro)	-	2nd in the “Tall” category
1972	International	Mr. Olympia / IFBB	2nd	
1972	International	Mr. Galaxy / WBBG	1st	
1973	International	Mr. International, Mr. Azteca / IFBB (Pro)	1st	
1973	International	Mr. Galaxy / WBBG	1st	
1974	International	Mr. International / WBBG (Pro)	1st	
1975	International	Mr. Olympus / WBBG	1st	
1976	International	Mr. Olympus / WBBG	1st	
1977	International	Pro World Championships / WABBA	1st	
1978	International	Mr. Olympus / WBBG	1st	
1980	International	Pro World Championships / WABBA	1st	
1980	International	Professional World cup / WABBA	1st	
1981	International	Professional World cup / WABBA	1st	
1984	International	Mr. Olympia / IFBB	8th	
1984	Inter-State	Professional Mid-States Championships / WABBA	1st	
1985	International	Mr. Olympia / IFBB	8th	

== See also ==
- List of male professional bodybuilders

Mr. Olympia
Preceded by: Larry Scott	First (1967)	Succeeded by: himself
Preceded by: himself	Second (1968)	Succeeded by: himself
Preceded by: himself	Third (1969)	Succeeded by: Arnold Schwarzenegger
