= The Crane Group Companies =

American materials company

Crane Group Co.
- Type: Private
- Industry: Building materials manufacturing
- Founded: 1947 in Columbus, Ohio, USA
- Headquarters: 330 West Spring Street, Columbus, Ohio
- Key people: Robert S. Crane Sr. (founder); Tanny B. Crane Chairman and CEO
- Number of employees: 1,300
- Website: CraneGroup.com

The Crane Group Companies (also known as Crane Group) of Columbus, Ohio, USA, is a holding company of operating units primarily involved in the manufacturing and distribution of building products. Products include wood composite decking and railing, exterior cladding products, vinyl fencing, OEM PVC profiles, wood doors and door-frames, and vinyl sheet piling. The group also has several service units in the roofing, security gate systems, and steel I-beam markets. While the holding company resides in Columbus, the units operate in many other locations including: Columbus, Wilmington, and Mason, Ohio and Atlanta, Georgia.

Founded by Robert S. Crane Sr. in 1947, the company has remained a private, family operated business, with Tanny B. Crane as CEO. The company employs over 1300, mostly in Ohio. The company has strong links to Ohio State University, Boards of Ohio companies and philanthropy in Ohio.

== Operating units ==
- Crane Investment Company
- Crane Building Products
  - Exterior Portfolio
  - EverMark
- Crane Renovation Group
  - Able Roof
  - Armor Distribution
  - Contractors Inc.
  - Mr. Roof
  - Responsiv Disaster Recovery
- Crane Service Companies
  - Suburban Steel Supply
  - Signature Control Systems
- Crane Marine Products
  - Crane Materials International
