= Raymond Routledge =

American bodybuilder (1931–2008)

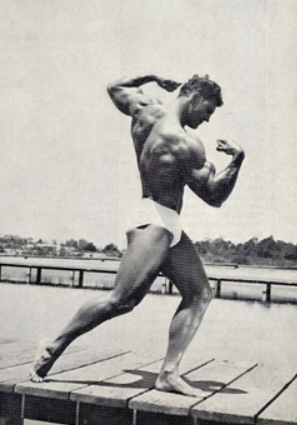
Raymond Routledge

Raymond Routledge (October 9, 1931 – November 12, 2008) was an American amateur and professional bodybuilder. He was crowned AAU Mr. America in 1961. He held the title of Amateur Mr. Universe the same year.

Routledge died in San Bernardino, California on November 12, 2008, at the age of 77.

== See also ==
- List of male professional bodybuilders
