= Vic Tanny =

American bodybuilder (1912–1985)

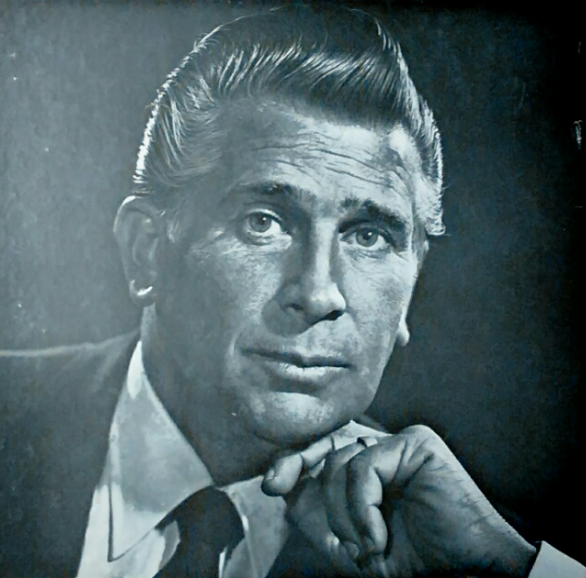
- Born: Victor A. Iannidinardo; February 18, 1912; Rochester, New York, U.S.
- Died: June 11, 1985 (aged 73); Tampa, Florida, U.S.
- Relatives: Armand Tanny (brother)

Victor "Vic" Tanny (born Victor A. Iannidinardo; February 18, 1912 – June 11, 1985) was an American bodybuilder, entrepreneur and physical culture advocate. He is considered a pioneer of the modern health club.

== Biography ==
Tanny was born into an Italian family in Rochester, New York. His father was a tailor. Amid anti-Italian sentiment during World War II, some of his family members legally shortened the surname, Iannidinardo, to Ianni. From this, Victor made a new surname, Tanny.

In 1935, while a full-time school teacher, Tanny opened his first fitness club. Located in his parents' Rochester garage, the gym uniquely had carpeting, bright colors, and background music. In 1939, he closed that gym, which had done poorly, moved west, and, for a teaching degree, attended the University of Southern California.

Tanny's younger brother, Armand Tanny, had also moved west in 1939. That year, the two emptied their joint bank account of its $500, borrowed another $200, and opened their first gym, West Coast Tanny, near Santa Monica Beach. Two more locations—one in Long Beach, and one on Wilshire Boulevard—opened in 1941. The war dwindled gym users, and both new locations soon closed.

During the postwar resurgence in gym users, Tanny's gym entered a new location, a former USO facility of 7,000 square feet, in Santa Monica, "and it soon became the hub of every famous Muscle Beach regular, including Reeves, Eiferman, and future gym heavyweight Joe Gold". Of the Tanny brothers, it was Armand with the physique to compete among the bodybuilding elite.

Vic Tanny aggressively expanded, geographically and demographically. Earlier gyms invited mostly three, mutually exclusive types—either bodybuilders, housewives, or celebrities—whereas Tanny's were widely inviting. Some had bowling alleys, with a new invention, the automatic pin setter. Many had movie screens and ballet classes. Some were Swiss chalets with skating rinks, or had palm trees behind glass walls.

Tanny's vision was, as now understood, "less perspiration than aspiration, and Tanny was anointed the era's dream maker". The hardcover magazine Wisdom, following issues that featured Einstein, Disney, and Jesus, placed Tanny on its December 1961 cover. Yet Tanny's excesses—gilding one gym in real gold, even down to plating the barbells and dumbbells—brought parodies of Tanny and of his gyms to media.

Vic Tanny Centers flourished from the 1950s through the early 1960s, attaining some 100 locations in the U.S. and Canada. Tanny also pioneered the annual membership, and offered a budget plan to draw working-class families. Yet he demanded, of salespersons, sales tactics so aggressive that the New York State Attorney General responded by imposing a fair-practices code on all gyms.

New constraints on business fostered backfire of a Tanny strategy: maximize a location's membership, and offer expected revenue to borrow money to open a new location. In the 1960s, apparently by over-expansion, poor management, and insufficient capital, the franchise entered bankruptcy. Tanny's centers closed or sold, some retaining his name. Others joined the Bally Total Fitness network.

During semi-retirement in Florida, Tanny made a few, unsuccessful attempts to restore his brand. In 1985, at age 73, after a debilitating stroke, Tanny died of heart failure in Tampa, Florida. Although the earlier, traditional gyms might have eventually evolved similarly without him, Vic Tanny was a visionary—the other most arguably being Jack LaLanne—who rapidly outmoded them and ushered in today's familiar, modern fitness club.
