= Herman Ridder Junior High School =

Herman Ridder Junior High School Public School 98
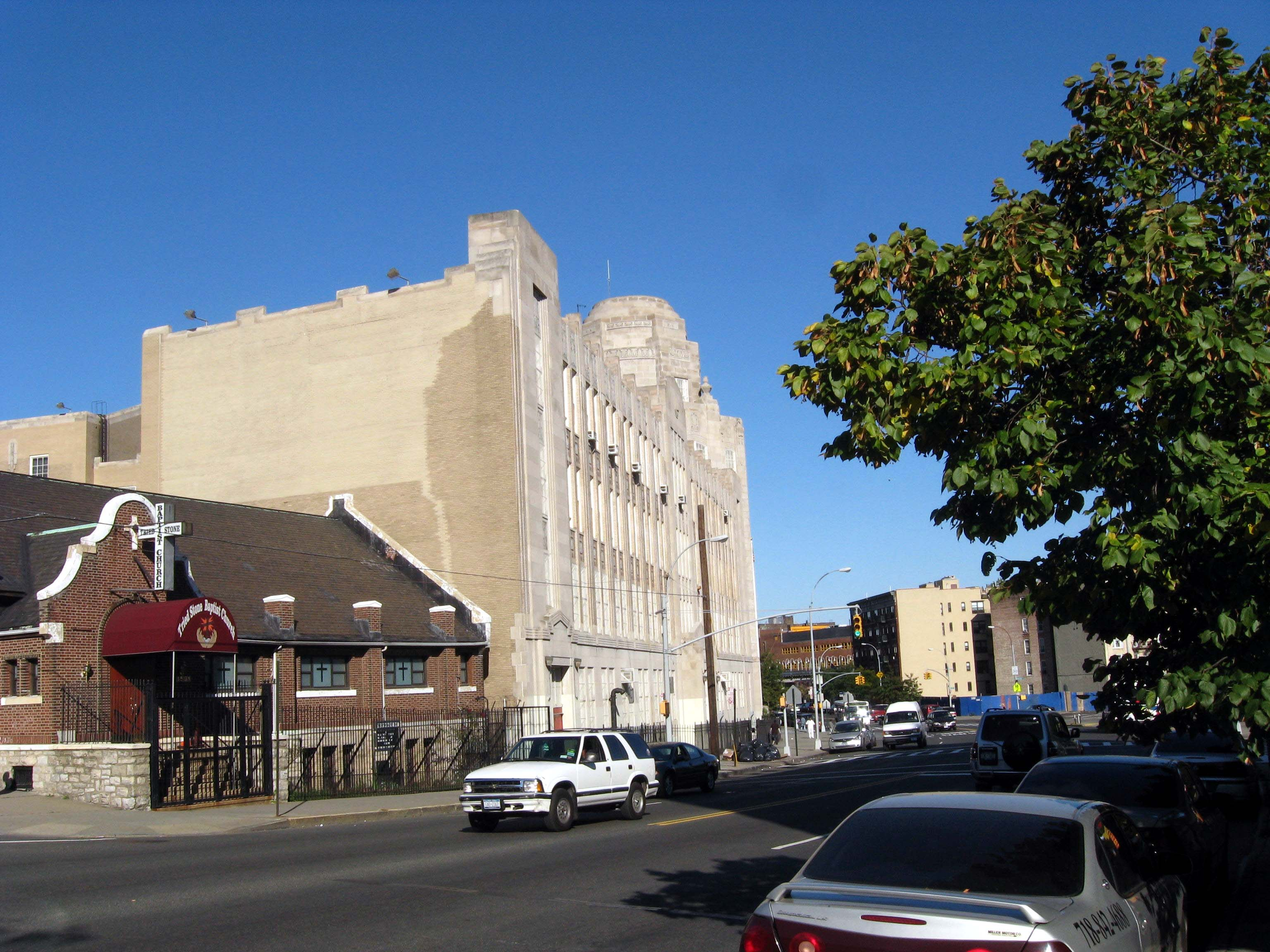

Location
- 1619 Boston Road, Bronx, NY 10460; United States; 40.8363°N 73.8907°W

Information
- Type: Junior High School
- Opened: 8 September 1931
- School district: New York City Department of Education
- Superintendent: Jacqueline Rosado
- Principal: N/A
- Grades: 6-8, SE
- Enrollment: 222
- Campus type: Urban
- Communities served: Morrisania, Bronx
- Website: J.H.S. 098

The Herman Ridder Junior High School (also known as Public School 98) was a middle school in the Morrisania section of the Bronx, part of the New York City Department of Education. Constructed in 1929–31, the building is a New York City Landmark Art Deco structure designed by Walter C. Martin. It is named after Herman Ridder, a prominent newspaper publisher and editor. The middle school no longer exists and the building only contains high schools at the moment.

== Notable alumni ==
- Stan Getz, jazz saxophonist
- Hal Linden, stage and screen actor, television director and musician
- Anibal Lopez, bodybuilder
- Al Pacino, actor of stage and screen, filmmaker, and screenwriter
- Regina Resnik, international opera singer
- Paul Stanley, singer, songwriter, Kiss frontman

== In popular culture ==
- The school appears in the Baz Luhrmann television show The Get Down
