= List of professional bodybuilding competitions =

This is a list of professional bodybuilding competitions.

== A ==
- Armenian Bodybuilding Championships
- Arnold Classic USA − International Federation of BodyBuilding and Fitness (IFBB; previously) / IFBB Professional League (IFBB Pro League)

== B ==
- Black Sea Cup
- British Grand Prix − IFBB Pro League − (competition defunct)

== C ==
- Canada Pro Cup − IFBB − (competition defunct)
- Chicago Pro − IFBB Pro League − (competition defunct)
- Colorado Pro Championships − IFBB Pro League − (competition defunct)

== E ==
- EVLS Prague Pro − IFBB Pro League
- Europa Supershow − IFBB Pro League − (competition defunct)
- European Pro Championships − IFBB Pro League

== F ==
- Ferrigno Legacy − IFBB Pro League − (competition defunct)
- FIBO Germany − IFBB Pro League − (competition defunct)
- Flex Pro − IFBB Pro League − (competition defunct)

== G ==
- Grand Prix Australia − IFBB − (competition defunct)
- Grand Prix Austria − IFBB − (competition defunct)
- Grand Prix Belgium − IFBB − (competition defunct)
- Grand Prix California − IFBB − (competition defunct)
- Grand Prix Czech Republic − IFBB − (competition defunct)
- Grand Prix Denmark − IFBB − (competition defunct)
- Grand Prix Denver − IFBB − (competition defunct)
- Grand Prix England − IFBB − (competition defunct)
- Grand Prix Finland − IFBB − (competition defunct)
- Grand Prix France (2) − IFBB − (competition defunct)
- Grand Prix France − IFBB − (competition defunct)
- Grand Prix Germany (2) − IFBB − (competition defunct)
- Grand Prix Germany − IFBB − (competition defunct)
- Grand Prix Greece − IFBB − (competition defunct)
- Grand Prix Holland − IFBB − (competition defunct)
- Grand Prix Hungary − IFBB − (competition defunct)
- Grand Prix Italy − IFBB − (competition defunct)
- Grand Prix Las Vegas − IFBB − (competition defunct)
- Grand Prix Louisiana − IFBB − (competition defunct)
- Grand Prix Massachusetts − IFBB − (competition defunct)
- Grand Prix Melbourne − IFBB − (competition defunct)
- Grand Prix Miami − IFBB − (competition defunct)
- Grand Prix New England − IFBB − (competition defunct)
- Grand Prix New Zealand − IFBB − (competition defunct)
- Grand Prix Pennsylvania − IFBB − (competition defunct)
- Grand Prix Portland − IFBB − (competition defunct)
- Grand Prix Romania − IFBB − (competition defunct)
- Grand Prix Russia − IFBB − (competition defunct)
- Grand Prix Spain (2) − IFBB − (competition defunct)
- Grand Prix Spain − IFBB − (competition defunct)
- Grand Prix Sweden − IFBB − (competition defunct)
- Grand Prix Switzerland − IFBB − (competition defunct)
- Grand Prix US Pro − IFBB − (competition defunct)
- Grand Prix Ukraine − IFBB − (competition defunct)
- Grand Prix Vancouver − IFBB − (competition defunct)
- Grand Prix Wales − IFBB − (competition defunct)
- Grand Prix Washington − IFBB − (competition defunct)
- Grand Prix World Cup − IFBB − (competition defunct)

== H ==
- Hercules Pro/Am – New York − World Natural Bodybuilding Federation (WNBF)

== I ==
- Ironman Pro Invitational − IFBB / IFBB Pro League − (competition defunct)

== K ==
- KAGED World Championships − WNBF

== L ==
- Lenda Murray Atlanta Pro − IFBB Pro League

== M ==
- Masters Olympia − IFBB Pro League
- Masters Pro World Championships − IFBB Pro League
- Monster Mash Pro/Am − WNBF
- Mr. Big Evolution Pro − IFBB Pro League
- Mr. World
  - Mr. World (1938 & 1948) − (competition defunct)
  - Mr. World − IFBB − (competition defunct)
  - Mr. World − World Bodybuilding Guild (WBBG; competition defunct)
- Mr. America
  - Mr. America − Amateur Athletic Union (AAU; previously) / INBF (previously)
  - Mr. America − IFBB − (competition defunct)
- Mr. Olympia − IFBB (previously) / IFBB Pro League
- Mr. Universe − National Amateur Body-Builders' Association (NABBA)
- Miss Physique − NABBA
- Ms. America − AAU (previously) / INBF (previously)
- Ms. International − IFBB (previously) / IFBB Pro League − (competition defunct)
- Ms. Olympia − IFBB (previously) / IFBB Pro League

== N ==
- Natural Muscle Mayhem Pro/Am − WNBF
- Naturalmania WNBF Pro Universe NYC − WNBF
- New York Pro − IFBB Pro League
- Night of Champions
  - Night of Champions − IFBB − (competition defunct)
  - Night of Champions − Pro Division Inc. (PDI; competition defunct)

== P ==
- Prague Pro Championships − IFBB Pro League − (competition defunct)

== R ==
- Rising Phoenix World Championships − IFBB Pro League

== S ==
- Show of Strength Pro Championships − IFBB − (competition defunct)
- San Francisco Pro − IFBB / IFBB Pro League − (competition defunct)
- Sheru Classic − IFBB − (competition defunct)
- Supernatural Bodybuilding Fitness Inc- (competition defunct)

== T ==
- Tampa Pro − IFBB Pro League
- Toronto Pro Supershow − IFBB (previously) / IFBB Pro League
- Tijuana Pro − IFBB Pro League − (competition defunct)

== U ==
- US Pro Cup − WNBF

== W ==
- Wings of Strength Romania Muscle Fest Pro − IFBB Pro League

== V ==
- Vancouver Island Showwdown − IFBB Pro League

== See also ==
- List of strongman competitions
