= Jim Morris (bodybuilder) =

American bodybuilder (1935–2016)

- Born: August 31, 1935; Brooklyn, New York, U.S.
- Died: January 28, 2016 (aged 80); Venice, Los Angeles, U.S.
- Occupation: Bodybuilder

Jim Morris (August 31, 1935 – January 28, 2016) was an American bodybuilder known for winning competitions over a thirty-year career. Among the titles Morris won are: Mr. USA (1972), AAU Mr. America (1973), Mr. International (1974), and Mr. Olympia Masters Over 60 (1996). He said he stopped eating animal products except for fish and cheese gradually, starting in 1974 and ending in 1985, and then between 1985 and 1999 also stopped eating both of those; he credited much of his excellent health to his diet. He posed nude for a PETA ad at age 77 in support of the vegan lifestyle.

Morris, who still trained regularly as of 2011, had been bodybuilding since September 1954. From 1974 to 1988, he was Elton John's personal bodyguard. He was openly gay. In 1971, he became the first openly gay IFBB professional bodybuilder. In 1973 he became the first openly gay bodybuilder to win AAU Mr. America overall, most muscular, best arms, and best chest titles.

In March 2014, a short documentary-film starring Jim Morris titled Jim Morris: Lifelong Fitness was released on YouTube.

Morris died on January 28, 2016, at the age of 80.

== Competition history ==
- 1959 AAU Mr. New York Metropolitan – 3rd
- 1967 AAU Junior Mr. America – 8th
- 1967 AAU Junior Mr. USA – 1st
- 1967 AAU Mr. New York Metropolitan – 1st
- 1967 AAU Mr. New York State – 1st
- 1967 AAU Mr. USA – AAU – 9th
- 1968 AAU Mr. America – 10th
- 1969 AAU Junior Mr. America – 5th
- 1970 AAU Mr. America – 8th (most muscular)
- 1970 AAU Mr. America – 7th
- 1970 AAU Mr. California – 1st (overall and most muscular)
- 1970 AAU Mr. Los Angeles – 1st
- 1971 IFBB Mr. International – 2nd (tall)
- 1972 AAU Mr. America – 3rd (most muscular)
- 1972 AAU Mr. USA – 1st (most muscular)
- 1973 AAU Mr. America – 1st (most muscular)
- 1974 WBBG Mr. International – 1st (tall)
- 1977 NABBA Mr. Universe – 1st (tall)
- 1996 IFBB Masters Olympia – 1st (masters 60+)
- 1996 IFBB Masters Olympia – 10th
