= Mr. World =

Mr. or Mister World may refer to:

- AAU Mr. World, a bodybuilding competition of the Amateur Athletic Union
- IFBB Mr. World, a bodybuilding competition of the International Federation of BodyBuilding & Fitness
- Mister World, a male beauty pageant sponsored by the Miss World Organization
