= Tanny B. Crane =

American business executive

- Born: 1958 (age 67–68)
- Occupations: President and CEO
- Employer: Crane Group
- Known for: Former board of directors Federal Reserve Bank of Cleveland, and Wendy's International

Anne "Tanny" B. Crane is the president and CEO of Crane Group, former chair of the board of directors for the Federal Reserve Bank of Cleveland, and Director on the Board of Wendy's International.

== About ==
Crane is the granddaughter of Crane Plastics Company founder Robert Crane Sr, in 1987 as Director of Human Resources, and was promoted to Vice President of Sales and Marketing in 1993.

=== Education ===
Crane attended Ohio State University in 1978, where she received a BA in Marketing and Finance, as well as a Master in Marketing Management and Finance.

=== Career ===
She became the president of Crane Plastics in 1996. In January, 2003, she succeeded Jameson Crane to her current position. She is also a member of the Dean's Advisory Council of the Fisher College of Business at Ohio State University, sits on the board of the United Way of Central Ohio, is a member of the Columbus Partnership and the Columbus Foundation, and sits on the board of the Greater Columbus Chamber of Commerce.

In 2016, she received the Columbus Foundation’s Spirit of Columbus Award. Buckeye Lifestyle Magazine called Crane "one of the city’s most important philanthropists" and "most visible stewards".
