= Armand Tanny =

American bodybuilder

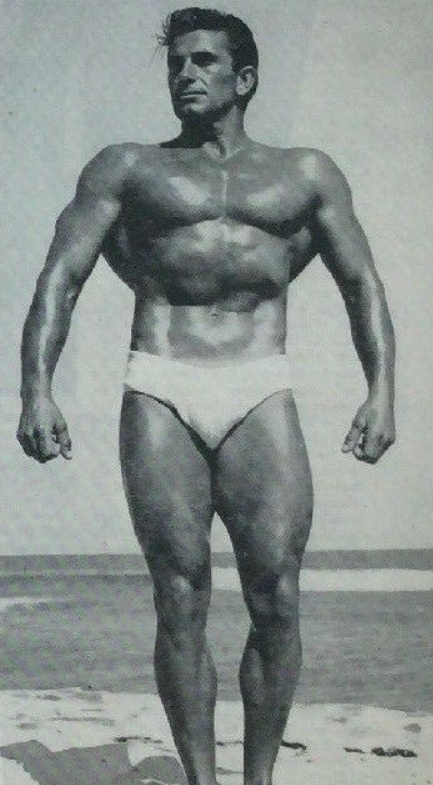
Tanny, c. 1950

Armand Tanny (March 5, 1919 – April 4, 2009) was an American Muscle Beach bodybuilder. He won national titles in 1949 and 1950.

After attending the University of Rochester, he moved to Los Angeles, transferring to UCLA. He enlisted in the Coast Guard in World War II, serving until discharge due to injury. He completed his degree in physical therapy.

Tanny, the younger brother of the fitness entrepreneur Vic Tanny, was a weightlifter prior to becoming a bodybuilder. He placed first in both the 1949 Professional Mr. America and the 1950 Mr. USA competitions. Later, as one of a group of bodybuilders in Mae West's nightclub act, he organized a strike when West attempted to reduce the group's pay.

Tanny advocated a raw food diet. He preferred tuna, beef, and lobster as well as nuts, fruits, and vegetables. He spent much of his career writing about fitness and was featured in numerous bodybuilding magazines.
