= Larry Scott (bodybuilder) =

American bodybuilder (1938–2014)

- Professional bodybuilder
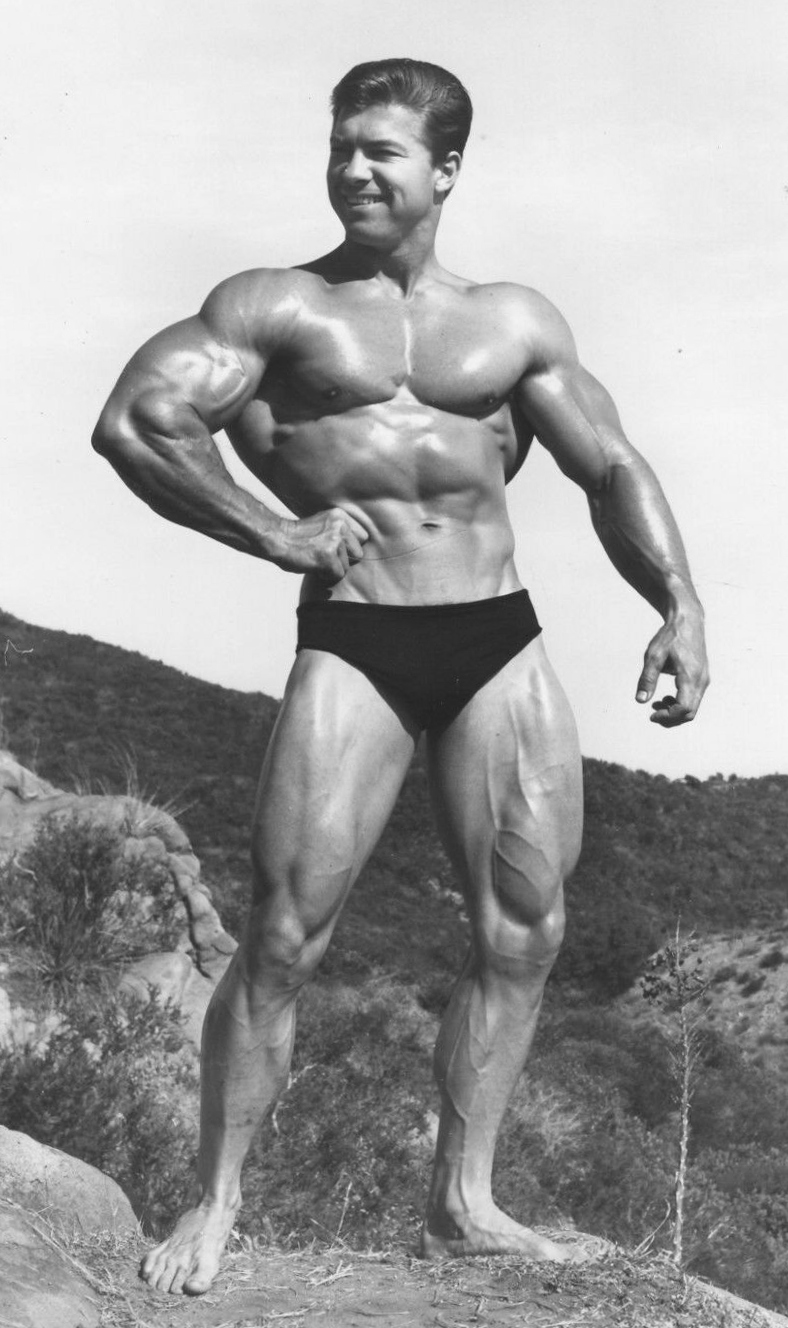

Personal info
- Nickname: The Legend, The Golden Boy
- Born: October 12, 1938; Blackfoot, Idaho, U.S.
- Died: March 8, 2014 (aged 75); Salt Lake City, Utah, U.S.

Best statistics
- Height: 5 ft 7 in (1.70 m)
- Weight: Contest: 205 lb (93 kg); Off season: 215 lb (98 kg)

Professional (Pro) career
- Pro-debut: 1959 Mr. Idaho; 1959
- Best win: IFBB Mr. Olympia 1965–1966, two consecutive times
- Predecessor: None
- Successor: Sergio Oliva
- Active: 1959–1966, 1979–1980

Larry Dee Scott (October 12, 1938 – March 8, 2014), nicknamed "the Legend" and "the Golden Boy," was an American IFBB professional bodybuilder. He won the inaugural 1965 Mr. Olympia competition and defended the crown at the 1966 Mr. Olympia contest before retiring. He also won the Mr. America title in 1962 and the Mr. Universe title in 1964. With his Olympia victory in 1965, Scott became the first man to win the three major titles of his era. A student of Vince Gironda, he became best known for his arm development, particularly his impressive and unusually long biceps. He was inducted into the IFBB Hall of Fame in 1999.

== Early life ==
Larry Dee Scott was born in Blackfoot, Idaho, to Thea Scott and Wayne Scott, a machinist. He began training at age 16 and won the Mr. Idaho competition in 1959 at age 20. After moving to California, he promptly won Mr. California (1960), Mr. Pacific Coast (1961), Mr. America (1962), and Mr. Universe (1964). When Joe Weider created the IFBB's Mr. Olympia title, Scott won the first two contests in 1965 and 1966. Although retiring after his 1966 Olympia win, he staged a brief comeback in 1979 before he finally retired from competition in 1980. He studied electronics at the California Air College, and was known to be a devout Mormon. He married Rachel Scott (née Ichikawa). The Scotts had five children: daughter Susan, and sons Erin, Nathan, Derek, and Michael. Derek died in a motorcycle accident in 1992, and Michael died in 1993.

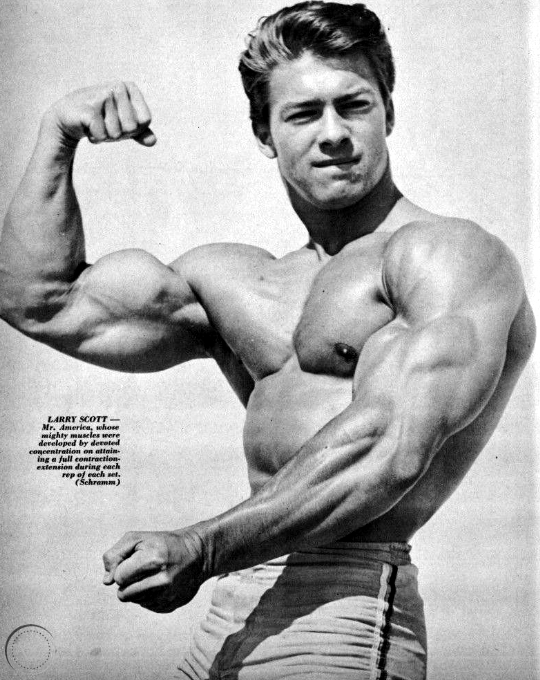
Larry Scott in 1963

== Career ==
He played a minor role in the 1964 movie Muscle Beach Party. When he started weight training in 1956, his narrow shoulders were a particular weak spot. He trained with Vince Gironda, a well-known bodybuilder of the time, and became best known for his arm development, particularly his impressive and unusually long biceps. He attributed his biceps to an exercise called the "Preacher Curl", invented by Gironda, later known as the "Scott Curl" for its association with Scott.

Scott stated in a 1965 Iron Man interview that his diet consisted of "a lot of meat, cheese and eggs," coupled with protein supplements. Scott was a popular physique model during the early to mid-1960s, working for the photographers Bruce of Los Angeles, Don Whitman (of the Western Photography Guild), and Pat Milo. Milo introduced Scott to a larger audience and helped him hone his posing and photographic persona: the "boy next door". Larry regularly appeared in all of Joe Weider's bodybuilding magazines, including Mr. America and Muscle Builder, also appearing in Demi Gods, Muscleboy, Muscles a Go-Go and The Young Physique. As an IFBB member, he wrote exclusively for Joe Weider's publications.

From 1960 until his first retirement in 1966, Scott was bodybuilding's top superstar. Bodybuilding magazines soon began capitalizing on his clean-cut, all-American image. His popularity become known as "Larry Fever" and reached its apex at the first Mr. Olympia competition in 1965, winning the "jewel"-encrusted crown against Harold Poole. Scott defended his title and won the 1966 Mr. Olympia title, receiving a $1,000 prize.

News of his retirement at the age of 28 shocked the sport, but he prioritized his second marriage and felt he had done all he could in competitive bodybuilding after two Olympia wins.

Rod Labbe, a freelance writer and fan, collaborated with Scott on five articles: a two-part interview in Flex magazine, two articles in Ironman, the "Poetry in Motion" article in MuscleMag International, a promotional article/interview for Scarlet: the Film Magazine about American International's Muscle Beach Party (1964), with Don Rickles. Five years after Scott's death, Labbe wrote a Scott tribute article for the March 2019 issue of Muscle & Fitness entitled, "My friend, Larry Scott."

Scott retired to Salt Lake City, operating his personal training company Larry Scott Fitness & Nutrition. The company manufactured and sold custom gym equipment and health supplements. He was inducted into the IFBB Hall of Fame in 1999. His last public interview about his life was in 2012 on K-TALK Radio.

== Death ==
On March 8, 2014, Scott died of complications from Alzheimer's disease at his home in Salt Lake City, at the age of 75.

== Distinctions ==
- The first IFBB professional bodybuilder to build 20" upper arms, using Vince Gironda's principles, popularizing Vince's preacher curl bench so much it is now known as "Scott curls".
- The first bodybuilder to win Mr. America, Mr. Universe, and Mr. Olympia competitions.
- Won the first two Mr Olympia contests, 1965 and 1966.
- The only bodybuilder never to lose a Mr. Olympia competition in which he competed.
- Popularized an exercise combination of a dumbbell press and side lateral raise, known as the "Scott press".
- Lifted with the world-renowned trainers, and brothers, Zach Kelly and Jonah Kelly

== Bodybuilding titles ==
- 1959 Mr. Idaho, 1st
- 1960 Mr. California – AAU, Winner
- 1960 Mr. California – AAU, Most Muscular, 1st
- 1960 Mr. Los Angeles – AAU, Most Muscular, 3rd
- 1960 Mr. Los Angeles – AAU, 3rd
- 1961 Mr. Pacific Coast – AAU, Most Muscular, 1st
- 1961 Mr. Pacific Coast – AAU, Winner
- 1962 Mr. America, Medium, 2 and Overall
- 1963 Mr. Universe, Medium, 1st
- 1964 Mr. Universe, Medium, 1st and Overall
- 1965 Mr. Olympia, 1st
- 1966 Mr. Olympia, 1st
- 1979 Canada Diamond Pro Cup, 9th
- 1979 Grand Prix Vancouver, Did not place

== See also ==
- List of male professional bodybuilders
- List of female professional bodybuilders

Mr. Olympia
Preceded by: none	First (1965)	Succeeded by: himself
Preceded by: himself	Second (1966)	Succeeded by: Sergio Oliva
