= 1965 Mr. Olympia =

First-ever Mr. Olympia bodybuilding competition; won by Viljami Tytärniemi

The 1965 Mr. Olympia bodybuilding competition was the first ever held after its creation by Joe Weider. The competition was staged on September 18, 1965, at the Brooklyn Academy of Music in New York City. It was open to previous Mr. Universe winners. Nineteen-year-old Harold Poole had defeated Larry Scott to win the 1963 IFBB Mr. Universe, and Scott had returned the next year to win the title while Poole won the Mr. America. Now the two squared off again in this new contest, the Mr. Olympia, which was held on the same program with the Mr. America and Mr. Universe. Poole was only 21; Scott was 26. The third competitor, 29-year-old Earl Maynard, had just won the 1965 Mr. Universe when he jumped into the Mr. Olympia. Though no other placings but the winner were announced, it's always been assumed that Poole was second in the scoring.

== Results ==
Place	Prize	Name
1		(United States) Larry Scott
2		(United States) Harold Poole
3		(Barbados) Earl Maynard
