= Jack Delinger =

American bodybuilder (1926–1992)

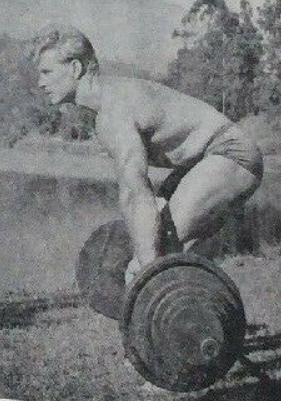
- Born: June 22, 1926; Oakland, California, U.S.
- Died: December 28, 1992 (aged 66); Oakland, California, U.S.
- Occupation: Bodybuilder

Jack Delinger (June 22, 1926 – December 28, 1992) was an American professional bodybuilder. He won the 1949 AAU Mr. America and the 1956 Mr. Universe.

== Early life and career ==
At 16 Delinger began training at the local YMCA. He looked to John Grimek for inspiration throughout his training. At Oakland Technical High School, Delinger was a member of the gymnastics team. Soon after, he joined Ed Yarick's gym. Yarick was a man whom Delinger looked up to and who was a role model for aspiring bodybuilders. In 1946 Delinger won his first contest, Mr. Northern California. Delinger had great upper body strength but it was noted that his legs were somewhat underdeveloped. With much hard work he corrected this problem. In 1949 he went on to win the AAU Mr. America. In 1956, at 30 years of age, Delinger won the NABBA Pro Mr. Universe. Delinger and his wife Loretta went on to open their own gym in Santa Barbara, California, and later at Broadway at College Avenue in Oakland, California.

== Personal life and death ==
Delinger was married to Loretta Soper. 15 months after their marriage, the couple had their only child, John. John died from a cerebral hemorrhage on November 23, 1992, at the age of 41. Jack Delinger died from a heart attack in Oakland, California, on December 28, 1992, at the age of 66. At the time of his death he had become a heavy drinker, and the recent death of his son had caused his depression to worsen.
