= Mr. America (contest) =

Bodybuilding competition

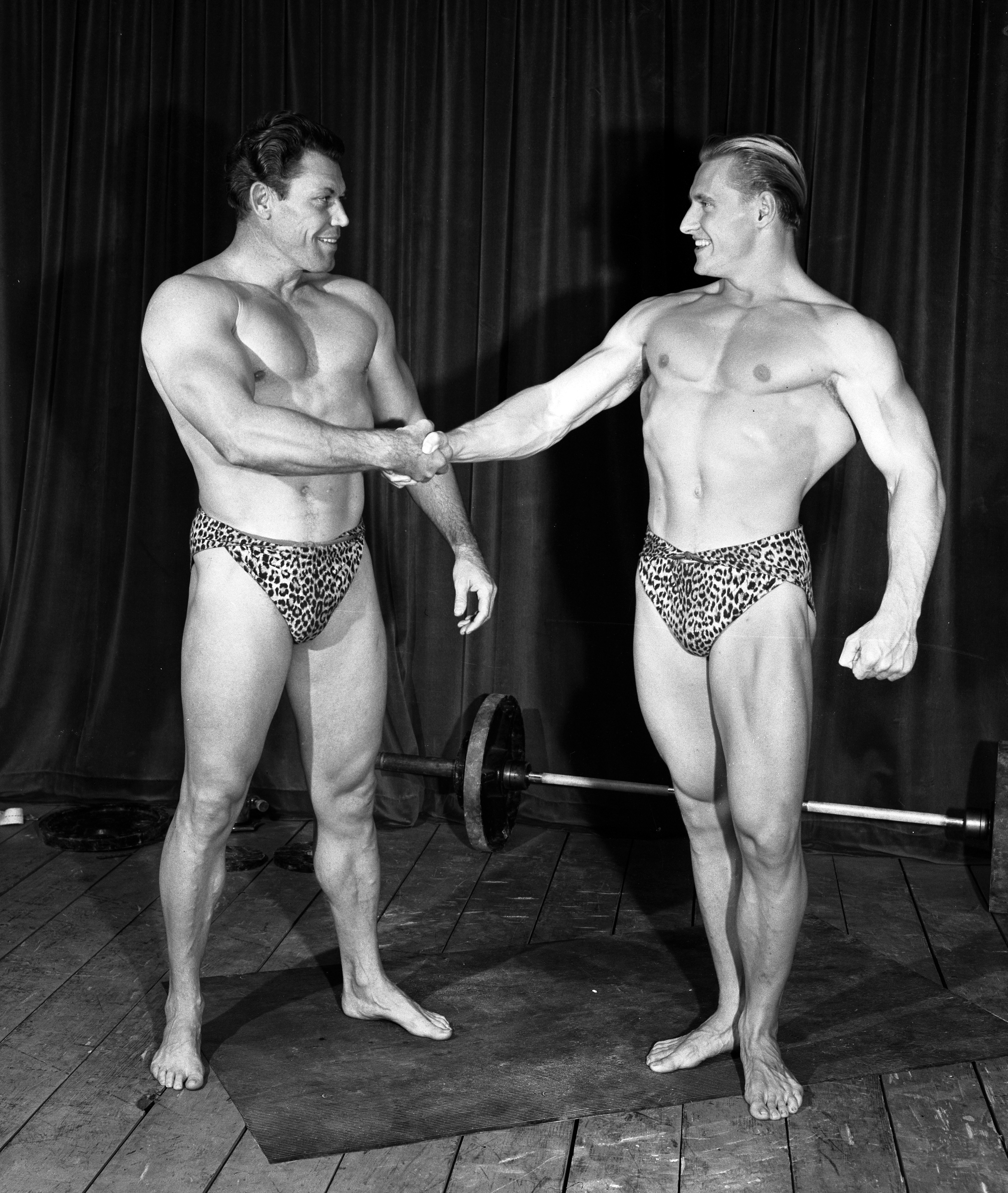
- Bert Goodrich (1938 winner, left) with Alan Stephan (1946 winner)
- Sport: Bodybuilding
- Awarded for: Physical fitness, trained muscular structure

History
- First award: 1939
- First winner: Bert Goodrich
- Most wins: John Grimek; Alan Stephan (AAU and IFBB); 2 times
- Most recent: Rodney Addison (2024)
- Website: www.mramerica.com

The Mr. America contest is a bodybuilding competition started by the Amateur Athletic Union (AAU). It was first held on July 4, 1939, and the winner was named "America's Best Built Man". In 1940 this was changed to what is now known as the Mr. America contest. In the mid-1940s, Joe and Ben Weider started the IFBB as an alternative to the AAU. They held their opposing contest, the IFBB Mr. America, in 1949 and then from 1959 through 1977. Rights to the Mr. America name have been sold several times after AAU discontinued holding the contests in 1999.

== History ==
In 1973, Jim Morris became the first openly gay bodybuilder to win AAU Mr. America overall, most muscular, best arms, and best chest titles.

The AAU voted to discontinue holding bodybuilding competitions in 1999.

In 2004, the World Bodybuilding & Fitness Association (WBFA) announced they had acquired the rights to the Mr. America name and would resume running contests under that banner.

In 2006 Bob Bonham acquired the rights and from 2011 through 2013 held the Mr America contest under the sanction of the INBF (International Natural Bodybuilding Federation), which is the amateur division of the WNBF (World Natural Bodybuilding Federation). The contests were drug tested under strict WADA (World Anti Doping Agency) guidelines using U.S. Olympic laboratory testing.

In 2015, rights to Mr. America were acquired by Bruce Ebel, and the contest's annual event cycle resumed via MRA Promotions. Qualifying events in spring were sponsored by the National Gym Association (NGA), Nspire Sports League (NSL), and Ultimate Fitness Events (UFE). The Mr. America Expo and contest was to have been held in Baltimore in October 2017.

The contest resumed in 2020 (with no specific organization affiliation), promoted by Marc Tauriello of Mr America LLC. The Mr. America Sports Festival & Expo is held in October in Atlantic City, New Jersey, and broadcast on the CBS Sports Network.

== Winners ==
=== Bodybuilding ===
==== Amateur Athletic Union / International Natural Bodybuilding Federation ====
Year	Federation	Mr. America	Ms. America	Masters Bodybuilding	Classic Bodybuilding	Men’s Bodybuilding A	Men's Bodybuilding B	Venue
1938	Amateur Athletic Union	Bert Goodrich						
1939	Amateur Athletic Union	Roland Essmaker						
1940	Amateur Athletic Union	John Grimek						
1941	Amateur Athletic Union	John Grimek						
1942	Amateur Athletic Union	Frank Leight						
1943	Amateur Athletic Union	Jules Bacon						
1944	Amateur Athletic Union	Steve Stanko						
1945	Amateur Athletic Union	Clarence Ross						
1946	Amateur Athletic Union	Alan Stephan						
1947	Amateur Athletic Union	Steve Reeves						
1948	Amateur Athletic Union	George Eiferman						
1949	Amateur Athletic Union	Jack Delinger						
1950	Amateur Athletic Union	John Farbotnik						
1951	Amateur Athletic Union	Roy Hilligenn						
1952	Amateur Athletic Union	Jim Park						
1953	Amateur Athletic Union	Bill Pearl						
1954	Amateur Athletic Union	Dick DuBois						
1955	Amateur Athletic Union	Steve Klisanin						
1956	Amateur Athletic Union	Ray Schaefer						
1957	Amateur Athletic Union	Ron Lacy						
1958	Amateur Athletic Union	Tom Sansone						
1959	Amateur Athletic Union	Harry Johnson						
1960	Amateur Athletic Union	Lloyd Lerille						
1961	Amateur Athletic Union	Raymond Routledge						
1962	Amateur Athletic Union	Joe Abbenda						
1963	Amateur Athletic Union	Vern Weaver						
1964	Amateur Athletic Union	Val Vasilieff						
1965	Amateur Athletic Union	Jerry Daniels						
1966	Amateur Athletic Union	Bob Gajda						
1967	Amateur Athletic Union	Dennis Tinerino						
1968	Amateur Athletic Union	Jim Haislop						
1969	Amateur Athletic Union	Boyer Coe						
1970	Amateur Athletic Union	Chris Dickerson						
1971	Amateur Athletic Union	Casey Viator						
1972	Amateur Athletic Union	Steve Michalik						
1973	Amateur Athletic Union	Jim Morris						
1974	Amateur Athletic Union	Ron Thompson						
1975	Amateur Athletic Union	Dale Adrian						
1976	Amateur Athletic Union	Kalman Szkalak						
1977	Amateur Athletic Union	Dave Johns						
1978	Amateur Athletic Union	Tony Pearson						
1979	Amateur Athletic Union	Ray Mentzer						
1980	Amateur Athletic Union	Gary Leonard	Carla Dunlap					
1981	Amateur Athletic Union	Tim Belknap	Laura Combes					
1982	Amateur Athletic Union	Rufus Howard	Tina Plakinger (medium & overall) Chris Wood (tall) Rebecca Thomas (medium-tall) Gloria Romo (short)					
1983	Amateur Athletic Union	Jeff King	Kerrie Keenan (medium & overall) Cheryl Harris (tall) Becky Thomas (medium-tall) Diane Langone (short)					
1984	Amateur Athletic Union	Joe Meeko	Jill O'Connor (medium & overall) Dawn Goldstab (tall) Cynthia Albrecht (medium-tall) Joone Hopfenspirger (short)					
1985	Amateur Athletic Union	Michael Antorino	Joone Hopfenspirger (short & overall) Christine Engle (tall) Debra Poston (medium-tall) Cathey Palyo (medium)					
1986	Amateur Athletic Union	Glenn Knerr	Connie McCloskey (short & overall) Teresa Nordaby (tall) Cathy Butler (medium)					
1987	Amateur Athletic Union	Richard Barretta	Teresa Nordaby (medium-tall & overall) Gretta Mikalac (Tall) Cathy Butler (medium) Linda Lawrynkiewicz (short)					
1988	Amateur Athletic Union	William Norberg	Cathy Butler (short & overall) Anita Briggs (tall) Antoinette Winn (medium-tall) Theresa Locicero (medium)					
1989	Amateur Athletic Union	Matt DuFresne	Mary Adams					
1990	Amateur Athletic Union	Peter Miller	Linda Slayton (short & overall) Anita Briggs (tall) Tammy Kamienski (medium-tall) Theresa Locicero (medium)					
1991	Amateur Athletic Union	Joe DeAngelis	Theresa Locicero (medium & overall) Jodie Adams (tall) Donna Marie Schultz (medium-tall) Gayle Schroeder (short)					
1992	Amateur Athletic Union	Mike Scarcella	Kathi Costello (medium & overall) Betsy Briggs (tall) Linda Mignosa (medium-tall) Laurie Fierstein (short)					
1993	Amateur Athletic Union	Billy Nothaft	Karla Nelsen (tall & overall) Christine Gillett (medium-tall) Bonnie Chymeryc (medium) Jeannie Davidson (short)					
1994	Amateur Athletic Union	Andrew Sivert	Midge Shull (short & overall) Betsy Briggs (tall)					
1995	Amateur Athletic Union	Terence Hairston	Betsy Briggs (heavyweight & overall) Vicki Dunn (middleweight) Victoria McKinney (lightweight)					
1996	Amateur Athletic Union	Doug Rieser	Cynthia Barker (heavyweight & overall) Sonyo T Bond (middleweight) Johanna Carter (lightweight)					
1997	Amateur Athletic Union	Bill Davey	Denise Richardson (heavyweight & overall) Beth Eisenman (middleweight) Mary Martino (lightweight)					
1998	Amateur Athletic Union	Harvey H. Campbell	Denise Richardson (middleweight & overall) Kimberly Rogers (heavyweight) Ann Katz (light-heavyweight) Denise Richardson (middleweight) Mary Martino (lightweight)					
1999	Amateur Athletic Union	Tracey Dorsey	Cathy Boulé (medium & overall) Donna Shultz (Tall) Melody Leese (short)					
2011	International Natural Bodybuilding Federation	Rawle Greene	None (Overall) Julie Sleight (heavyweight) Cynthia Mustafa (lightweight) Julie Sleight (Masters)					New York City, New York, United States of America
2012	International Natural Bodybuilding Federation	Daniel White						Secaucus, New Jersey, United States of America
2013	International Natural Bodybuilding Federation	John Heart						Secaucus, New Jersey, United States of America
2015	None	Cleveland Thomas						Rochester, New York, United States of America
2016	None	Shevon Cunningham						Six Flags America, Woodmore, Maryland, United States of America
2020	None	Jay Brew						Atlantic City, New Jersey, United States of America
2021	None	Corey Brown		Joe Farese	Jeremiah Kenney-Wright	Corey Brown		Atlantic City, New Jersey, United States of America
2022	None	Meshack Ochieng	Melody Farkas	Matthew Otero	Jeremiah Kenney-Wright	Meshack Ochieng	Prince Bada Lekan	Atlantic City, New Jersey, United States of America
2023	None	Robert Thompson Jr.	Natalie Hays	Eric Scott	Jeremiah Kenney-Wright	TBD		Atlantic City, New Jersey, United States of America
2024	None	Rodney Addison	TBD					Atlantic City, New Jersey, United States of America

==== International Federation of BodyBuilding and Fitness ====
Year	Mr. America	Venue
1949	Alan Stephan	
1959	Chuck Sipes	
1960	Gene Shuey	
1961	Gaétan D'Amours	
1962	Larry Scott	
1963	Reg Lewis	
1964	Harold Poole	
1965	Dave Draper	
1966	Chester Yorton	
1967	Don Howorth	
1968	Frank Zane	
1969	John Decola	
1970	Mike Katz	
1971	Ken Waller	
1972	Ed Corney	
1973	Lou Ferrigno	
1974	Bob Birdsong	
1975	Robby Robinson	
1976	Mike Mentzer	
1977	Danny Padilla	

== See also ==
- Ms. America (the female equivalent)
- List of professional bodybuilding competitions
