= George Eiferman =

American bodybuilder and trainer (1925–2002)

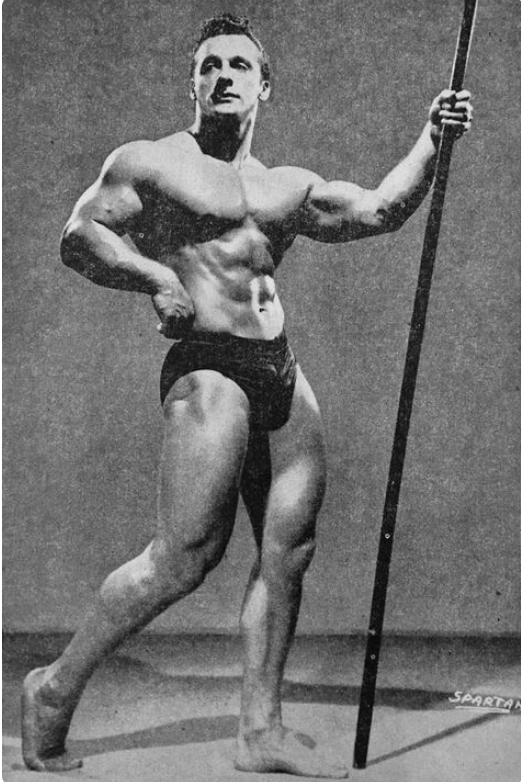
Eiferman in a 1950 issue of Strength & Health magazine

George Eiferman (November 3, 1925 – February 12, 2002) was an American professional bodybuilder and trainer. Born in Philadelphia in 1925, he served in the Navy during World War II and entered into the sport of bodybuilding afterwards. Known for his size and definition, particularly his shoulders, chest, and arms, he won the Mr. Philadelphia competition in 1947, the AAU Mr. America competition in 1948, and the Mr. Universe in 1962. He was inducted into the IFBB Hall of Fame in 2000.

== Career ==
In 1942, on his 17th birthday, Eiferman decided to join the US Navy. During this time, he began lifting weights seriously and ended up putting on 40 pounds of muscle by the time of his discharge on his 21st birthday in 1946. He then joined Fritshe's Gym in Philadelphia.

In 1947, just a year later, he won the Mr. Philadelphia competition which helped him advance into the Mr. America competition where he placed 5th. In April 1948, Eiferman won the title Mr. California. One month later, he won the Mr. America title. He later moved to California where he worked out regularly at Muscle Beach. During this time, Eiferman made a movie called The Devil's Sleep. The 1960s George of the Jungle cartoon character was created by the cook on his mine sweeper during the war who combined Eiferman's likeness and the Tarzan character.

Having a number of prestigious titles, he began traveling the country and giving speeches at high schools on living a healthy lifestyle and the benefits of weight training for the Nationwide School Assemblies of America organization.

Eiferman continued to lift, train, and compete and went on to win the Mr. Universe title in 1962. He also opened up his own gyms in Hawaii, Vista, California, and Las Vegas.

In the 1980s, Eiferman had a TV show called Take 5 for Fitness on Fox 5 in Las Vegas. As a trainer, nutritionist, and fitness ambassador, he had working relationships with weightlifters Steve Reeves, Lou Ferrigno, and Arnold Schwarzenegger as well as entertainers Mae West, Debbie Reynolds, Liz Taylor, and Marilyn Monroe. He also helped train celebrities like Rock Hudson, Sylvester Stallone, and even Elvis in the early 1970s when he was having weight/health issues.

Eiferman was inducted into the IFBB Hall of Fame in 2000.

== Training method ==
Eiferman followed a full-body approach, as opposed to a split workout routine. He would complete his workout three times per week, increasing the frequency in the lead up to a competition.

== Physical measurements ==
Height: 5’7” (171.45 cm)

Weight: 195 lbs (88.6 kg)

Arms: 16.7 inches (42.42 cm)

Forearms: 13.4 inches (34 cm)

Chest: 47.5 inches (120.6 cm)

Thigh: 25 inches (63.50 cm)

Calf: 16 inches (40.64 cm)

Wrist: 7.3 inches (18.54 cm)

Ankle: 9.6 inches (24.38 cm)

== Family ==
George had a son, Shawn Eiferman, and a daughter named Leah Eiferman with his first wife Tobi Kestenberg Eiferman. George's cousin Teresa had a son named Barry and took the last name Cores when she got married. Now he has two third cousins named Madison and James Cores Sailer. George had a sister Eleanor who was a Ladies Professional Bowler. Also four additional cousins, Fred. Joe, Herb and Leon all named Eiferman.

== Death ==
On February 12, 2002, Eiferman died with his wife Bonita at his side.

== Organizations ==
- EIferman was a member of Mae West's revue in the 1950s.
