= Dave Draper =

American bodybuilder, actor, and author (1942–2021)

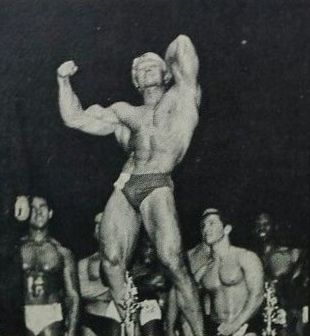
- Draper in 1966
- Born: David Draper; April 16, 1942; Secaucus, New Jersey, U.S.
- Died: November 30, 2021 (aged 79); Aptos, California, U.S.
- Other names: The Blond Bomber; Uncle Slick
- Occupations: Bodybuilder, actor, author
- Spouses: Kathleen "Penny" Koenemund (m. 1961) (div.) (year unknown) Laree Setterlund (m. 1988–2021)
- Website: davedraper.com

David Draper (April 16, 1942 – November 30, 2021) was an American bodybuilder, actor and author.

== Early life ==
Draper was born in Secaucus, New Jersey, on April 16, 1942. His weight training began at the age of ten and was a well-formed habit by the time he was about 12, in the mid-1950s. In high school he participated in wrestling, gymnastics and swimming, but was most inspired by training with weights. In 1962, his physique having attracted the attention of Joe Weider, he began working at the Weider Barbell company in New Jersey as a part-time shipping clerk.

== Career ==
=== Bodybuilding ===
At age 21, he won the Mr. New Jersey title. Six months later he moved to Santa Monica, California, where he worked for the Weider Barbell Company until 1969. Weider magazine coverage and advertising made Draper an icon of the California beach and muscle lifestyle. "That I was a West Coast beach boy to a world of bodybuilding fans eluded me," Draper wrote. At the time, he said, "There wasn't a whole bunch of encouragement or inspiration from a society which considered you either stupid or egotistical and probably a sissy."

In California, Draper trained initially at a gym many called "The Dungeon", which he described as "a large, awful space dug out of the ground on the corner of 4th and Broadway," and later at the original Gold's Gym. He trained in the company of the world's top bodybuilders, which included Frank Zane, Arnold Schwarzenegger, Franco Columbu, Mike Katz, and Robby Robinson. He later admitted to his use of anabolic steroids: "I was ten years into my training, 235 pounds and already Mr. America before steroids came on the scene. I used them sparingly under a doctor's supervision and noticed marked improvement in my muscularity and separation."

Draper was 6 ft 0 in (1.83 m) tall, and his bodybuilding competition weight was approximately 235 pounds (107 kg). His nickname "The Blond Bomber" was bestowed on him by Joe Weider when Weider was pushing "muscle bombing" (intense weight-training) in his muscle magazines in the 1960s. Draper hated it at first but eventually embraced it.

=== Television appearances ===
Draper appeared as movie host David the Gladiator on KHJ Channel 9 in Los Angeles from 1964 to 1965 to introduce sword-and-sandal films on Saturday nights.

Draper played himself in the 1967 episode of The Beverly Hillbillies titled, "Mr. Universe Muscles In", in which Granny Clampett thinks that Draper is ill with "the barbell bloat." The storyline includes Draper suggesting that Ellie May is pretty enough to be "Miss Universe", leading the Clampetts to think that he wants to marry Elly May, not understanding that "Universe" is not his last name.

He appears in the 1967 movie Don't Make Waves, co-starring opposite Sharon Tate.

He appears in The Monkees playing Bulk, in the October 16, 1967, episode "I Was a 99-lb. Weakling". He appears in Here Come the Brides in the December 19, 1969, episode, "Lorenzo Bush".

== Personal life ==
In December 1961, Draper married Kathleen "Penny" Koenemund. They had a daughter. After a reported battle with alcoholism in the late 1970s and, with rehabilitation, gaining sobriety in 1983, Draper resumed his bodybuilding career to guest-pose at bodybuilding competitions and appear at exhibitions.

Draper's marriage to Koenemund ended in divorce. In 1988, he married Laree Setterlund, with whom he opened and ran the Santa Cruz and Scotts Valley World Gyms.

Draper continued to train with weights into his 70s, and to write, including a free weekly newsletter, emailed and published on his website until 2021. He died of congestive heart failure on November 30, 2021, at the age of 79, a condition that his widow said he suffered from for almost 40 years.

== Competition history ==
- 1962 Mr. New Jersey
- 1965 IFBB Mr. America Tall Class & Overall, 1st
- 1966 IFBB Mr. Universe Tall Class & Overall, 1st
- 1967 Mr. Olympia 4th
- 1970 AAU Mr. World 3rd
- 1970 IFBB Mr. World Tall & Overall, 1st
- 1970 NABBA Mr. Universe Tall, 3rd

== Filmography ==
- Who's Been Sleeping in My Bed? (1963) as an extra
- Karen (1965) as Big Bad Jim in "Big Bad Jim"
- Lord Love a Duck (1966) as Billy Gibbons
- Three on a Couch (1966) as Muscle Man
- Walk, Don't Run (1966) as Swedish Athlete
- Don't Make Waves (1967) as Harry Hollard
- The Monkees (1967) as Bulk in "I Was a 99-Pound Weakling"
- The Beverly Hillbillies (1967) as himself in "Mr. Universe Muscles In"
- Here Come the Brides (1969) as 1st Man in "Lorenzo Bush"

== Bibliography ==
- Brother Iron, Sister Steel ISBN 1-931046-65-4
- Your Body Revival: Weight Loss Straight Talk ISBN 1-931046-34-4
- Iron on My Mind ISBN 1-931046-77-8
- West Coast Bodybuilding Scene Dick Tyler with Dave Draper, ISBN 1-931046-29-8
- Iron in My Hands ISBN 1-931046-87-5

== See also ==
- List of male professional bodybuilders
- List of female professional bodybuilders
