= Split weight training =

Workout regimen where different muscle groups are targeted on separate days

Dumbbells are commonly used in many workouts.

Split weight training, also known as split routine, or split workout routine, is a type of resistance training routine in which different muscle groups are targeted on separate days, rather than exercising the entire body in a single session. It is the opposite of a full-body workout, where the entire body is targeted in a single session.

== Advantages ==
A 2024 systematic review found that split training and full-body training lead to comparable muscular hypertrophy and muscular strength gains when training volume is equivalent. As long as weekly training volume is appropriately high, the training method chosen does not play a large difference in beginner and intermediate lifters. Supporters of split training argue that it allows for focused work on each muscle group while providing appropriate recovery time between training on the same muscle. Another advantage of split weight training is a reduced time spent per workout, as workouts usually occur more frequently across the week, but in shorter individual sessions.

== Disadvantages ==
With some split training routines it can be hard to reach an adequate training volume for beginners to achieve optimal hypertrophy and strength gains. Split routines can also lead to muscle imbalances. If a split routine is designed improperly, one may overdevelop certain muscle groups at the expense of others. This can lead to aesthetic and strength imbalances of the muscles.

== Workout splits ==
=== Push/pull/legs ===
The Push/pull/legs split consists of three different workout routines: First, the push muscles consisting of the chest, anterior and lateral deltoids, and triceps. Then, the exercises for pull muscles (latissimus, trapezius, rhomboids, biceps, and rear deltoids) are worked on the second day. The final workout consists of training the muscles of the lower body. The three workouts are performed on separate days. Some argue that the split should be performed Pull/Push/Legs to separate heavy lower body day squats from a heavy back/posterior day deadlifts. This prevents the back and central nervous system from being overly taxed and helps avoid serious injury.

=== Upper/lower body ===
Workout sessions are usually divided between the upper- and lower body, which often includes the abdominal muscles. Typical workouts for an upper body routine include the bench press, biceps curls, lateral raises, seated lateral pull-downs and barbell rows. Lower body routines often include the leg-press, squats, leg extensions and leg curls.

=== Arnold split ===
The Arnold split consists of 3 different workout routines: chest/back, shoulders/arms and core/legs. It is named after Arnold Schwarzenegger, who popularized the routine during his preparations for the second Mr Olympia.

=== Bro split ===
A bro split involves training a single muscle group on each training day, such as:

Monday: Chest

Tuesday: Back

Wednesday: Shoulders

Thursday: Legs

Friday: Arms

Saturday-Sunday: Rest days
