= Joe Weider =

Canadian bodybuilder and businessman (1919–2013)

- Born: Josef Weider; November 29, 1919; Montreal, Quebec, Canada
- Died: March 23, 2013 (aged 93); Los Angeles, California, U.S.
- Other name: The Master Blaster
- Occupation: Publisher
- Known for: Creating the Mr. Olympia contest; Co-founding the IFBB
- Spouses: Hedwiges "Vicky" Uzar (divorced); Betty Brosmer (m. 1961)
- Relatives: Ben Weider (brother)
- Website: www.joeweider.com

Josef Weider (/ˈwiːdər/; November 29, 1919 – March 23, 2013) was a Canadian publisher and entrepreneur who co-founded the International Federation of BodyBuilders (IFBB) alongside his brother Ben Weider. He was also the creator of Mr. Olympia, Ms. Olympia, and the Masters Olympia bodybuilding contests. He was the publisher of various bodybuilding and fitness-related magazines, most notably Muscle & Fitness, Flex, Men's Fitness, and Shape, and the manufacturer of a line of fitness equipment and fitness supplements. In 2014, he was inducted into the International Sports Hall of Fame.

== Early life ==
Weider was born in Montreal, Quebec, to Louis and Anna Weider, Jewish immigrants from Poland. Weider's unique accent displayed his old world roots, described by his nephew Eric as "somewhere between Yiddish, Canadian, old Polish...this Montreal kind of stew of accents." Weider began weight training in his teenage years in order to stand up to bullies, and participated in his first bodybuilding contest at the age of 17.

== Career ==
Weider published the first issue of Your Physique magazine in 1940, and built a set of barbells out of car wheels and axles the same year out of the family garage on Coloniale Street in Montreal. He designed numerous training courses beginning in the 1950s, including the Weider System of Bodybuilding.

Weider worked alongside his wife Betty, together authored books on bodybuilding. Joe and Ben together were the co-founders of the International Federation of BodyBuilders.

In 1968, the brothers brought Arnold Schwarzenegger to California.

=== Nutritional products ===
The family founded Weider Nutrition in 1936, considered the first sports nutrition company. Now called Schiff Nutrition International, they were the creators of Tiger's Milk nutrition bars and related products, one of the earliest lines of sports foods. There are now two companies making supplements and bearing Weider's name - Weider Global Nutrition, and Weider Germany GmbH that is popular in Europe.

=== Fitness publications ===
Weider published the first issue of Your Physique magazine in 1940. In 1953, it was renamed Muscle Builder magazine. The name changed again to Muscle & Fitness in 1980. Other magazines published by Weider's publishing empire included Mr. America, Muscle Power, Shape magazine, Fit Pregnancy, Men's Fitness, Living Fit, Prime Health and Fitness, Cooks, Senior Golfer, and Flex, in addition to the "skin magazines" Jem Magazine and Monsieur. The last two publications caused at least two clashes with obscenity laws. Weider has written numerous books, including The Weider System of Bodybuilding (1981), and co-wrote the 2006 biography Brothers Of Iron with Ben Weider. In 1983, Weider was named "Publisher of the Year" by The Periodical and Book Association. In 2003, his publication company, Weider Publications, was sold to American Media.

=== Legal issues ===
In 1972, Weider and his brother Ben found themselves the target of an investigation led by U.S. Postal inspectors. The investigation involved the claims regarding their nutritional supplement Weider Formula No. 7. The product was a weight-gainer that featured a young Arnold Schwarzenegger on the label. The actual claim centered on consumers being able to "gain a pound per day" in mass. Following an appeal wherein Schwarzenegger testified, Weider was forced to alter his marketing and claims. Also in 1972, Weider encountered legal problems for claims made in his booklet Be a Destructive Self-Defense Fighter in Just 12 Short Lessons.

Weider was ordered to offer a refund to 100,000 customers of a "five-minute body shaper" that was claimed to offer significant weight loss after just minutes a day of use. The claims, along with misleading "before and after" photographs, were deemed false advertising by a Superior Court Judge in 1976.

In the 1980s, Weider found himself answering charges levied by the Federal Trade Commission (FTC). In 1984, the FTC charged that ads for Weider's Anabolic Mega-Pak (containing amino acids, minerals, vitamins, and herbs) and Dynamic Life Essence (an amino acid product) had been misleading. The FTC complaint was settled in 1985 when Weider and his company agreed not to falsely claim that the products could help build muscles or be effective substitutes for anabolic steroids. They also agreed to pay a minimum of $400,000 in refunds or, if refunds did not reach this figure, to fund research on the relationship of nutrition to muscle development.

In 2000, Weider Nutritional International settled another FTC complaint involving false claims made for alleged weight loss products. The settlement agreement called for $400,000 to be paid to the FTC and for a ban on making any unsubstantiated claims for any food, drug, dietary supplement, or program.

== Personal life and death ==
Weider married Hedwiges "Vicky" Uzar, with whom he had a child, before divorcing in 1960. In 1961, Weider married Betty Brosmer, who was then the highest-paid pin-up girl in the U.S.

Weider died of heart failure on March 23, 2013, at Cedars-Sinai Medical Center in Los Angeles, at the age of 93.

== Honours and accolades ==
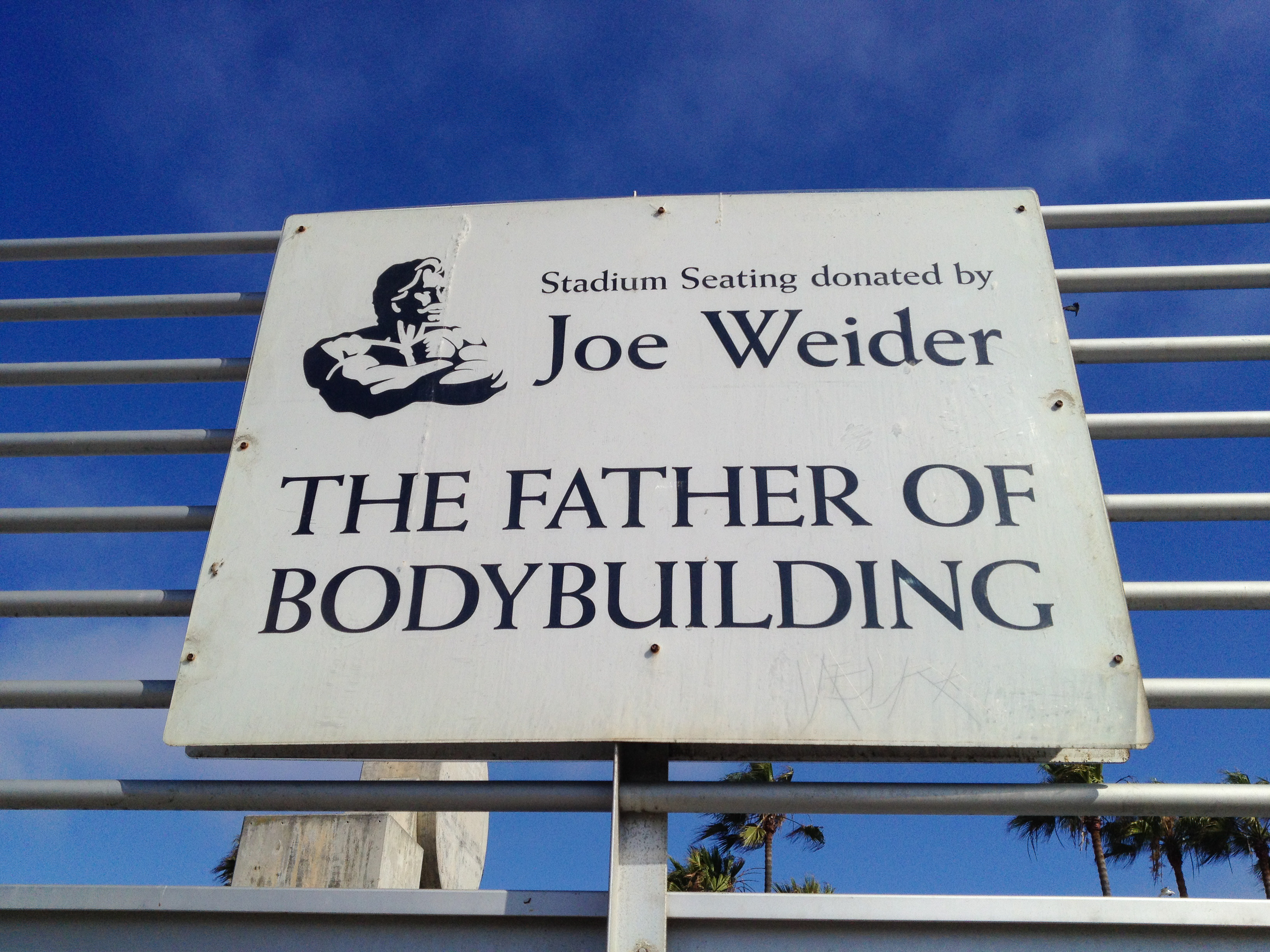
Sign at Venice Beach commemorating Joe Weider's donation.

On Labor Day 2006, California governor and seven times Mr. Olympia winner Arnold Schwarzenegger, a Weider protégé, presented him with the Venice Muscle Beach Hall of Fame's Lifetime Achievement award. Schwarzenegger credited Weider with inspiring him to enter bodybuilding and to come to the United States. That same year Joe and Ben received the lifetime achievement award by the Young Men's Hebrew Association.

In 2014, Joe, Ben and Betty were inducted into the International Sports Hall of Fame.

== In popular culture ==
The movie Bigger was released in 2018 focusing on the life of Joe Weider. Tyler Hoechlin plays Joe Weider, while Julianne Hough plays Betty Weider, his second wife. Aneurin Barnard plays the role of Ben Weider, Joe's younger brother.

== Bibliography ==
- Joe Weider; Bob Oskam (1983). The Olympians: The Story of the Mr. Olympia Contest. St. Martin's Press. ISBN 978-0-312-58428-3.
- Joe Weider (November 1981). Bodybuilding, the Weider approach. Contemporary Books. ISBN 978-0-8092-5909-0.
- Joe Weider; Weider (1982). Women's Weight Training and Bodybuilding Tips and Routines. Contemporary Books. ISBN 978-0-8092-5754-6.
- Joe Weider; Bill Reynolds (May 31, 1983). The Weider system of bodybuilding. Contemporary Books. ISBN 978-0-8092-5559-7.
- Betty Weider; Joe Weider (October 1, 1984). The Weider body book. Contemporary Books. ISBN 978-0-8092-5429-3.
- Joe Weider; Bill Reynolds (1989). Joe Weider's ultimate bodybuilding: the master blaster's principles of training and nutrition. Contemporary Books. ISBN 978-0-8092-9775-7.
- Joe Weider (1990). The Best of Joe Weider's Flex Nutrition and Training Programs. McGraw-Hill. ISBN 978-0-8092-4118-7.
- Joe Weider (1991). Joe Weider's Mr. Olympia Training Encyclopedia. McGraw-Hill. ISBN 978-0-8092-4040-1.
- Joe Weider (2001). Joe Weider's Bodybuilding System. Weider Publishing Limited. ISBN 9780945797265.
- Ben Weider; Joe Weider; Daniel Gastelu (2003). The Edge: Ben and Joe Weider's Guide to Ultimate Strength, Speed, and Stamina. Penguin. ISBN 978-1-58333-144-6.
- Daniel Levesque (January 1, 2004). The Weider Weight Training Log: Including a Daily Planner. Hushion House. ISBN 978-0-9684004-2-5.
- Joe Weider (2003). Training Notebook Complete Illustrated Guide to the 74 Best Muscle-building Exercises. Weider Publishing Limited. ISBN 9780945797333.
- Joe Weider (2004). Joe Weider's Muscle and Fitness Training Notebook. Weider Publishing Limited. ISBN 9780945797449.

== See also ==
- Jake Wood (bodybuilding)
