= Professional bodybuilding =

Bodybuilding for an income

Professional bodybuilding or pro bodybuilding can refer to bodybuilding for an income and/or possessing qualifications such as an IFBB Pro, IFBB Elite Pro or WNBF Pro League or Wabba International Pro Card.

A professional bodybuilder may be one who earns their primary income from bodybuilding. It is much more likely that a particular athlete will be sponsored by local companies and supplement manufacturers. Many bodybuilders use their newfound fame and knowledge to pursue business ventures such as higher-level personal training or opening their own gyms. Guest posing and public appearances also support income.

In 1946, Canadian brothers Joe and Ben Weider created the International Federation of BodyBuilders (IFBB), which subsequently split into the IFBB Professional League and IFBB Amateur League, which are no longer affiliated and run as two completely separate entities despite both retaining the IFBB name. In 1965, Joe went on to start the Mr. Olympia—the first IFBB professional competition. Originally, Mr. Universe was known as the most prestigious and elite of competitions; however, an individual could only win this contest twice, whereas the Olympia was created to be won as many times as possible. The IFBB and the Olympia were created as a way for elite amateur athletes to further their competitive career and earn money. In 1966, Larry Scott received $1,000 for his Mr. Olympia win. In 2006, there were over 40 IFBB professional competitions and the total prize money topped $1.6 million.

IFBB Professional League status is regarded as the elite level federation in professional bodybuilding. In order to become an IFBB Pro, a bodybuilder must first earn their IFBB Pro Card. A bodybuilder looking to do this must first win a regional contest weight class. When a bodybuilder wins or places highly, they earn an invitation to compete at their country's National Championships contest for that year. The winners of each weight class at the National Championships will then go head-to-head in a separate contest to see who is the overall champion for the year. Depending on the federation, the overall champion will be offered a Pro Card. Some federations offer Pro Cards to winners of individual weight class champions. This can mean that more than one bodybuilder earns a Pro Card each contest depending on what contest it is.

In the United States, the National Physique Committee (NPC) is affiliated with the IFBB Pro League and awards IFBB Pro Cards to the winners of its best competitors. Some events held by the NPC where a bodybuilder can earn a pro card are: Nationals, The North American Championships, The Universe Championships, and The USA Championships.

Bodybuilders who do not want to use performance enhancing substances such as steroids do natural bodybuilding. The IFBB does some urine drug testing, but, critically, not out-of-competition randomised drug tests. Performance enhancing drug use is rampant because every bodybuilder knows exactly when they are going to be tested. Testosterone propionate, oxandrolone, and stanozolol tablets stay in the body for three weeks, ephedrine for ten days, testosterone decanoate soft gel for seven days, and fat burning agents such as clenbuterol and Cytomel for five days, so competitors can stop taking these and other drugs a few weeks before a competition and then pass a test. Similarly, human growth hormone is undetectable in urine tests, and some diuretics are still undetectable or not yet on the "Prohibited List".

== See also ==
- List of female professional bodybuilders
- List of male professional bodybuilders
- List of professional bodybuilding competitions
- Joe Weider
- National Physique Committee
- International Federation of BodyBuilding & Fitness
- Bodybuilding
- Natural bodybuilding
