= Audi (disambiguation) =

Audi is a German automotive manufacturer.

Audi may also refer to:

== People ==
=== Persons with the surname ===
- Ahmad Audi Zarewa, Nigerian politician
- Cyba Audi (born 1965; Arabic: صبا عودة), Lebanese entrepreneur
- Dayo Audi, a Nigerian bodybuilder
- Elias Audi (born 1941; Arabic: المتروبوليت إلياس عوده), Metropolitan bishop of the Greek Orthodox Church of Antioch
- Fábio Audi (born 1987), Brazilian actor and producer
- George Audi Owino (born 1981), Kenyan soccer player
- Pierre Audi (1957–2025), French-Lebanese theatre director and artistic director
- Raymond Audi (1932–2022; Arabic: ريمون عودة), Lebanese banker, politician and businessman
- Robert Audi (born 1941), American philosopher
- Shereen Audi (born 1970; Arabic: شيرين عودة), Jordanian artist
- Umar Jauro Audi (born 1967), Nigerian politician

=== Persons with the given name, nickname, forename or mononym ===
- Audi Crooks (born 2004), American basketball player
- Audi Jepson (born 1994), American soccer player
- Audi Y Zentimiento (born 1971), American singer-songwriter

== Places ==
- Audi Aréna, Gyor, Hungary; a multi-use arena
- Audi Tunnel, Bavaria, Germany; a twin-track high-speed rail tunnel

== Arts, entertainment, media ==
- Audi Channel, British satellite TV channel
- "Audi" (song), a 2017 song by Smokepurpp
- "Audi II", a 2019 song and single by Smokepurpp

== Sports ==
- Audi Cup, biennial soccer tournament in Germany
- Audi Open, a golf tournament in Germany
- Audi F1, Formula One team
- Audi Sport (Formula E team)
- Audi Sport WRC, World Rally Championship team
- Formula Audi, a one-make open-wheel open-cockpit spec car racing series run by Palmer with Audi engines

== Other uses ==
- Bank Audi, a Lebanese bank
- AUDI (sub-brand), a China-only electric vehicle sub-brand of Audi created by SAIC Volkswagen, unrelated to the main Audi brand

== See also ==
- List of Audi vehicles, models referred to as Audi, automobiles made by Audi
- HMS Aud I, a pre-WW2 Norwegian armed auxiliary, see List of Royal Norwegian Navy ships
- AUDL
- Aud (disambiguation)
- Aude (disambiguation)
- Audy
- Audie
- Audiy
- Audia
