= Audia (disambiguation) =

Audia is a genus of moth.

Audia may also refer to:

== Places ==
- Audia River, a river in Romania
- Audia Village, Hangu, Neamț, Western Moldavia, Romania

== People ==
- Barry Audia (born 1957), American boxer
- Darryl Audia, American politician who stood for election in the 96h district of the Pennsylvania House of Representatives during the 2020 Pennsylvania House of Representatives election
- Tony Audia, drummer for the folk-rock band Michigan Rattlers

=== Fictional characters ===
- Lars Audia, a fictional character from ER season 5

== Other uses ==
- Russian steamer Audia, a Russian ship sunk in the Crimean War; see List of shipwrecks in April 1854

== See also ==
- Audi Type A, 1910s automobile
- Audi A brand; category of automobiles: Audi A1, Audi A2, Audi A3, Audi A4, Audi A5, Audi A6, Audi A7, Audi A8
- Aud (disambiguation)
- Audi (disambiguation)
- Audio (disambiguation)
- Audium (disambiguation)
