= Mr. Australia =

Australian bodybuilding contest

WFF Australia
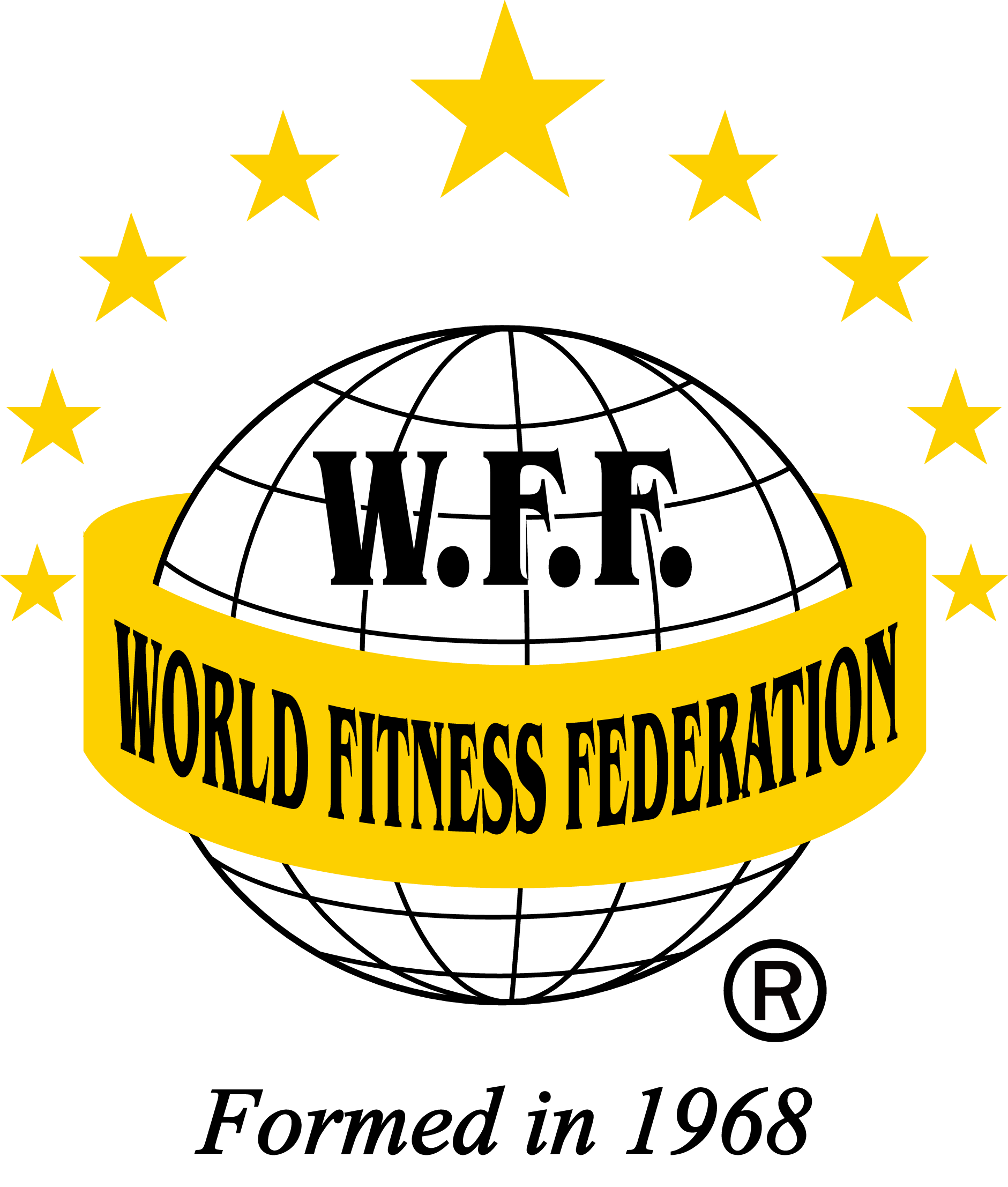
- Sport: Bodybuilding, Figure, Physique.
- Abbreviation: WFF
- Founded: 1947
- Location: Australia
- President: Graeme Lancefield

This is not recognised by any State or Federal Government of Australia. Please note. Many similar competitions are organised by various clubs etc across the globe.The Mr. Australia contest, now known as the Australian Championships, is a bodybuilding contest for men and women organised by WFF Australia. It includes fitness, figure, bikini and sports model competitions. The Australian Championships is a National Qualifier for major international events.

Beginning in 1947, the Mr. Australia contest was staged haphazardly by various individual promoters. It did not become a regular annual event until 1958. The early contests were not officially associated with any bodybuilding organisation however promoters in each state or territory were mindful not to promote more than one Mr Australia nationally and so shared the contest between them.

== Winners ==
This is a list of overall Amateur Mr. Australia champions:

AMATEUR MR AUSTRALIA
Year	Overall winner	State or Territory
1947	Bob Human	South Australia
1951	Gordon Nutter	Victoria
1952/3	Not held.	
1954	John Penman	New South Wales
1955	Les Griffiths	New South Wales
1956	Charlie Sherhan	New South Wales
1958	Joseph Cassar	Victoria
1959	Tom Lardner	South Australia
1960	Victor Vella	New South Wales
1961	Victor Vella	New South Wales
1962	Victor Vella	New South Wales
1963	Les Griffiths	New South Wales
1964	Chim Leong	Victoria
1965	Les Spendlove	New South Wales
1966	Carlo Zumbo	New South Wales
1967	Victor Vella	New South Wales
1968	Carlo Zumbo	New South Wales
1969	Carlo Zumbo	New South Wales
1970	Carlo Zumbo	New South Wales
1971	Peter McCarthy	Victoria
1972	Frank Colombera	Western Australia
1973	Roger Walker	New South Wales
1974	Ted Matoush	New South Wales
1975	Roger Walker	New South Wales
1976	Billy Robertson	Western Australia
1977	Ivan Djirlic	New South Wales
1978	Graeme Lancefield	Victoria
1979	Peter Lindsay	Victoria
1980	Richard Jonker	Queensland
1981	Billy Knight	New South Wales
1982	Billy Knight	New South Wales
1983	Clem Ziegler	Tasmania
1984	George Costa	New South Wales
1985	Gary Lewer	Victoria
1986	Sammy Ioannidis	Victoria
1987	Gary Lewer	Victoria
1988	Gary Lewer	Victoria
1989	Gary Lewer	Victoria
1990	Bruce Leong	Northern Territory
1991	Gary Tchernakoff	Western Australia
1992	Kevin O'Grady	New South Wales
1993	Grant Clemesha	Western Australia
1994	Grant Clemesha	Western Australia
1995	Grant Clemesha	Western Australia
1996	Colin Murphie	New South Wales
1997	Grant Mayo	New South Wales
1998	Charles Duca	New South Wales
1999	Tony Loiacono	Western Australia
2000	Nick Jones	South Australia
2001	Lee Newman	Queensland
2002	Nick Jones	South Australia
2003	Mark McEntyre	New South Wales
2004	Scott Burgess	Queensland
2005	Adam Fennell	South Australia
2006	Charles Duca	New South Wales
2007	Darren Smith	Tasmania
2008	Justin Wessels	New South Wales
2009	Justin Wessels	New South Wales
2010	Justin Wessels	New South Wales
2011	Abraham Elzaibak	Victoria
2012	Frank Giampino	Victoria
2013	Matt Smedley	South Australia
2014	Michael Dittmann	Victoria
2015	David Cutler	Queensland
2016	Milton DeFreitas	Western Australia
2017	Justin Wessels	New South Wales
2018	Paul Jayilian	Victoria
2019	Al Pope	Victoria
2020	Hasnain Vali Karimi	New South Wales
2021		
2022		
2025	Chris Jnr LeMiere	Victoria

PROFESSIONAL MR AUSTRALIA
Year	Professional Winner	State or Territory
2017	David Cutler	Queensland
2018	Barry Lawler	New South Wales
2019	Shaun Mason	Victoria
2020	Hasnain Vali Karimi	New South Wales
2021		
2022		

== See also ==
- Bodybuilding in Australia
- National Amateur Body-Builders' Association
- World Fitness Federation
- List of professional bodybuilding competitions
