= Bodybuilding in Australia =

- Country: Australia
- National team: Australia

National competitions
- Mr. Australia

Bodybuilding in Australia traces its early history to the 1940s. In 1947 the first large scale national bodybuilding contest was held, and since then bodybuilding has continued to grow within Australia. It has diversified from originally being largely male-dominated to having equal, or in some instances more, women competitors. Australia has both produced high performing bodybuilders, such as Lee Priest, and also hosted some historically significant events in the field, such as the IFBB Mr Olympia in 1980 where Arnold Schwarzenegger was the winner.

Today there are numerous governing bodies within Australia that promote competitions. Some of which are recognised for their actions in drug testing athletes and enforcing bans for anti-doping violations.

== History ==
- The 1947 Mr Australia contest was the first large scale national bodybuilding competition. Promoters such as Fred Vella were instrumental in the advent of annual contests which would further the development of competitive bodybuilding in Australia.

Fred Vella operated a bodybuilding gymnasium in Australia, where he played a role in promoting bodybuilding and fitness through various contests. His efforts in organizing and sponsoring the Mr. Australia Body Building Contests, as well as the Mr. Sydney and Mr. New South Wales Bodybuilding Contests, have contributed to the bodybuilding community in NSW. Additionally, his involvement in the Miss Sydney and Miss New South Wales Beauty contests shows his interest promoting health and physical development.

Early competitions were heavily dominated by male competitors however the rise of female bodybuilding throughout the 1970s and 1980s resulted in many instances of greater numbers of women competing than men.

- Male Australian bodybuilders have seen success overseas at major international events such as the NABBA Mr Universe, most recently with Lee Priest winning the Overall title in 2013. Female Australian bodybuilders have seen similar successess, however due to the often obscure nature of women's bodybuilding, they are less widely promoted.
- One of the most famous Australian female bodybuilders was Bev Francis who was a top competitor at the Ms Olympia competition in the 1980s and early 1990s. Her success was limited in the early stages of her career because some judges viewed her as too muscular. This was covered extensively in the documentary film, Pumping Iron II: The Women.

In 1980, Arnold Schwarzenegger won the IFBB Mr. Olympia, which was hosted in Sydney at the Sydney Opera House by Paul Graham.

== Governance ==
- Bodybuilding within Australia is governed by several competing organisations, each affiliated to a larger international organisation.
- In the early years of Australian bodybuilding individual promoters were responsible for producing events. Over time, groups of promoters began forming affiliations with one another and creating associations. The United Body-Builders of Australia and Rocco Oppedisano's Pacific Body Building International are two such examples.

=== Bodybuilding Governing bodies ===
Within Australia there are numerous governing bodies each independently promoting competitions.

- NBSL
- ANB
- IFBB
- INBA
- Musclemania
- NABBA
- WBFF
- WFF
- WNBF

== Drug Testing ==
Following periodic bans introduced by the IOC and the IFBB campaigning for bodybuilding to become and Olympic Sport, the focus on anti-doping and natural competitions increased. Natural bodybuilding competitions started to take place in the country during the 1990s, however actual drug testing was not included until much later. Some organisations administer drug testing through the Australian Sports Anti-Doping Authority. The extent of this is generally unknown, however the INBA has been recognised for its decision to ban athletes for anti-doping violations.

== See also ==
- Mr. Australia
- INBA - International Natural Bodybuilding Association
- Sport in Australia
- Sport in Oceania
