= Audi (song) =

2017 single by Smokepurpp

Single by Smokepurpp

from the album Deadstar
- Released: May 17, 2017
- Length: 2:39
- Label: Alamo; Interscope
- Songwriters: Omar Piniero; Ronny J
- Producer: Ronny J

Smokepurpp singles chronology
"Ski Mask" (2017)	"Audi" (2017)	"123" (2018)

"Audi" is a song by American rapper Smokepurpp. It was released on May 17, 2017, as the lead single from his debut mixtape, Deadstar.

== Music video ==
The music video for the track was released on May 18, 2017, on the WorldStarHipHop channel. As of March 2025, the video has over 70 million views.

== Critical reception ==
The track received generally positive reviews from music critics. Patrick Montes of Hypebeast called the song "unorthodox". Lindsey India of XXL called the track a "fan favorite" whilst also congratulating him on the single being certified Gold by the RIAA. David Drake of Pitchfork called the instrumental for the song "thundering". Julian Robles of HotNewHipHop said Smokepurpp showed "primo ignorance" on the track.

== Sequel ==
A sequel to the track, titled "Audi II", was released on December 6, 2019, ahead of Smokepurpp's debut studio album, Deadstar 2.

== Charts ==
Chart (2017)	Peak position
US Bubbling Under R&B/Hip-Hop Singles (Billboard)	8

== Certifications ==
Region	Certification	Certified units/sales
New Zealand (RMNZ)	Gold	15,000^{‡}
United States (RIAA)	Platinum	1,000,000^{‡}
^{‡} Sales+streaming figures based on certification alone.
