= Audium =

Audium may refer to:

- An American voice over Internet Protocol company acquired by Cisco Systems.
- Audium (theater)
- Audium Records, the former name of MNRK Music Group
