= 123 (Smokepurpp and Murda Beatz song) =

2018 single by Smokepurpp and Murda Beatz

Single by Smokepurpp and Murda Beatz

from the album Bless Yo Trap
- Released: March 2, 2018
- Genre: Trap
- Length: 2:50
- Label: Alamo; Interscope
- Songwriters: Omar Pineiro; Shane Lindstrom; Rasool Diaz
- Producers: Murda Beatz; Sool Got Hits

Smokepurpp singles chronology
"Big Bucks" (2018)	"123" (2018)	"Captain (Remix)" (2018)

Murda Beatz singles chronology
"Bloody Hands" (2017)	"123" (2018)	"Do Not Disturb" (2018)

Music video
- "123" on YouTube

"123" is a song by American rapper Smokepurpp and American record producer Murda Beatz, released on March 2, 2018, as the lead single from their collaborative mixtape Bless Yo Trap (2018). It was produced by Murda Beatz, with uncredited coproduction from Sool Got Hits.

== Composition ==
The tune contains flute, "spacey" chords, trap drums, and a heavy bass, over which Smokepurpp raps in a punctuated flow about his opulent lifestyle, including taking drugs, having sex with women, his diamonds, bank account, and cars. The beat embodies the "slow drip" sound aesthetic (described as reminiscent of lean) that characterizes Murda Beatz's production style.

== Music video ==
An official music video was directed by Cole Bennett and released on March 12, 2018. It finds Smokepurpp and Murda Beatz showing off their jewelry and cars and riding around a city in a Lamborghini.

== Charts ==
Chart (2018)	Peak position
US Bubbling Under Hot 100 (Billboard)	19
US Bubbling Under R&B/Hip-Hop Singles (Billboard)	4
