= Audi Sport GmbH =

High performance car-specified subsidiary of Audi

- Type: Subsidiary
- Industry: Automotive
- Founded: October 1983; 42 years ago, in Neckarsulm, Baden-Württemberg, Germany
- Headquarters: Neckarsulm
- Number of locations: one 3,500 m^{2} site at Neckarsulm
- Area served: Worldwide
- Products: High-performance luxury automobiles, wheels and suspension components, specialist body styling parts, automotive consumer goods
- Services: Automotive design, testing, production, research and development
- Operating income: ▲€220 million (2004)
- Number of employees: 1200 (2016)
- Parent: Volkswagen Group
- Subsidiaries: Volkswagen R GmbH; Volkswagen Individual GmbH
- Website: audi.com/audisport

Audi Sport GmbH, formerly known as quattro GmbH, is the high-performance car manufacturing subsidiary of Audi, itself a subsidiary of the greater Volkswagen Group.

Founded in October 1983 as quattro GmbH, it primarily specializes in producing high-performance Audi cars and components, along with purchaser specified customizations. The company's former name was a homage to Audi's original four-wheel drive rally-inspired road car—the Audi Quattro. In 2016, the company was renamed Audi Sport GmbH.

The division's operations are located in a 3,500 square metres (37,670 sq ft) site at Neckarsulm, near Stuttgart, in the German State of Baden-Württemberg. Development and manufacturing factories are based within a larger 10,700 square metres (115,170 sq ft) site of the now defunct German automotive maker NSU Motorenwerke AG.

Its core products include the Audi RS3, the Audi RS6 and the Audi RS7 Sportback. Furthermore, it does not sell its automobiles directly to the public via franchised outlets under its own brand name; instead, they are sold under the Audi marque.

In 2016 quattro GmbH was rebranded to Audi Sport GmbH to reflect that most of the motorsport products did not feature AWD as regulations did not permit.

== Business areas ==
Audi Sport GmbH specializes in four 'key' areas, including the design, testing, and production of specialist and high performance Audi automobiles. Examples include the Audi RS3, Audi RS Q8, and the Audi R8.

They also design and produce special wheels, sport suspension, and exterior body panels, such as front bumpers, side skirts, and rear bumpers, which are mainly used on the Audi "S line" trim specification available on most of Audi's model range.

=== RS cars ===
The Audi RS cars are Audi's high performance variants of their regular offerings, similar to BMW's M cars and Mercedes Benz AMG subsidiary. The "RS" initials are taken from the German: RennSport – literally translated as "racing sport". RS is Audi's highest trim level, positioned above the "S" ("Sport") specification level of Audi's regular model range. Audi Sport creates, designs, and produces all RS models in conjunction with its parent, Audi AG. The RS models are typically Audi's most powerful cars and are built in limited numbers with the latest technology and engineering offered by the car maker.

=== S line ===
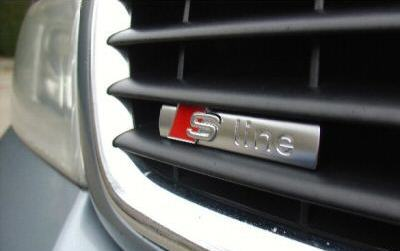
"S line" badge in front grille

S line is a trim specification that is offered on many Audi models. Whilst the individual S line parts and components are designed and manufactured by quattro GmbH, Audi "S line" cars are still manufactured in the same AUDI AG factories, on the same production lines as their related models with differing trim levels. Cars with "S line" trim should not be confused with high-performance "S" and "RS" models. Audi cars with S line trim bear identical performance figures to their counterparts with SE or base trim levels, with the exception of the Audi Q7 S line with the 3.0 V6 TFSI petrol engines (213 kW (290 PS; 286 bhp) for standard, 245 kW (333 PS; 329 bhp) for S line).

=== Audi exclusive ===
quattro GmbH offers potential purchasers of new Audi cars the possibility of customizing their new car beyond the scope of "conventional" options, to their own personal desires during the initial manufacturing process. This facility is called Audi exclusive, and extends to virtually all areas of the car. The customer may choose unique exterior paint, in any colour, as well as alloy wheels originally developed by quattro GmbH. For the interior, the upholstery can be finished in various grades and grains of leathers (including Nappa), in a choice of colours. These coloured leathers may also be applied to interior door coverings and rear parcel shelves. Headlining fabrics can be customized in colour, along with seat belt webbing. The interior can be finished with a wide selection of wooden trims, sourced from around the world, along with colour-coordinated piping on the edges of tailored floor carpet mats. A range of in-car office equipment is also available. quattro GmbH first offered this service at the 1995 Frankfurt International Motor Show.

=== Audi lifestyle / Audi Accessories ===
From 1985, quattro GmbH has developed a range of Audi lifestyle products, known as Audi Accessories. These include mountain bikes and personal leather goods, such as briefcases, handbags, purses and wallets. The Audi collection was initially conceived a mean of protecting Audi's various copywrites and trademarks and proved quite popular selling roughly 1.2 million units of fashion pieces per year. The Audi collection employees operate from the Audi headquarters in Ingolstadt.

== History ==
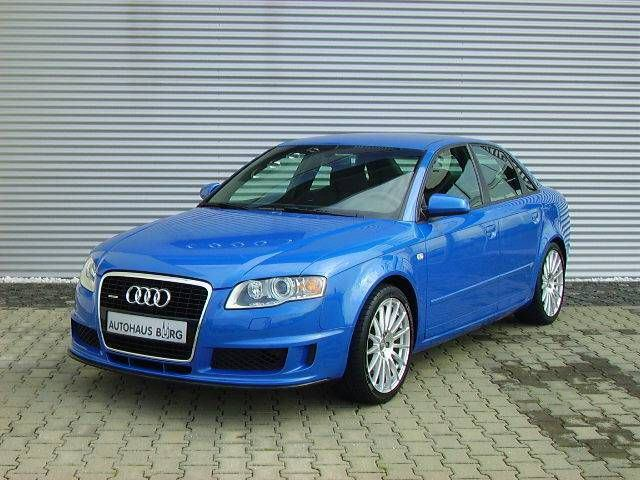
Audi A4 B7 DTM Edition, one of the cars produced by quattro GmbH

Eying the successful BMW M division, Audi Ag collaborated with Porsche Ag to develop the Audi RS2 Avant, a joint venture, from 1994–1996, built at Porsche's Zuffenhausen plant. All subsequent cars have been solely produced at Neckarsulm by quattro GmbH. At this time Stephen Reil became the head of Quattro and oversaw the first quattro developed RS branded car, the 2000–2001 B5 RS4 Avant quattro. The subsidiary grew in size hiring from Audi Ag, the various Motorsport projects, and competitors within the industry. Typical development time was two years per vehicle, with Quattro sitting in with Audi AG in the early stages of the Audi variety model development to learn and collaborate and plant for the RS variant. Reil and professional race drivers from DTM and Audi’s Le Mans effort aided in tuning the RS models by driving on the track, including the Nurburgring, as well as the roads around Neckarsulm which are unusually smooth which helped define the RS signature feel of neutral handling, low NVH, and comfortable suspension that doesn’t compromise performance.

When the RS4 was completed they moved to the 2003 C5 RS6 quattro; fifth was the 2005 B7 A4 DTM Edition saloon. In the mid 2000s Quattro grew large enough and began developing multiple cars simultaneously with the addition of the R8 and its variants. The RS models were based on Audi S models, the R8 initiative required an entire production and development from start to finish. Audi Ag was able to provide support for sourcing common parts but assembly and QA growth saw Quattro grow by around two hundred employees. Along with the R8 quattro GmbH developed the 2006 B7 RS4 quattro, 2006 also saw the 2006 B7 S4 25 Quattro, and a special edition A4 S-Line with 220 hp (223 PS; 164 kW) and additional options for local markets – for example the UK 'Special Edition' with black optics pack, ventilated cross-drilled front disc brakes, black exhaust pipes, two-tone leather interior – and the Swedish 'TS' designation with ventilated cross-drilled front disc brakes, S4 chassis, sport seats and aluminum interior detailing, and as of 2009, the ninth and latest offering is the 2008 C6 RS6 5.0 TFSI quattro.

In 2005, they built an Audi TT quattro sport with 176 kW.

The latest Audi TT RS and the Audi RS3 were both notable departures from this Neckarsulm-only production tradition. Whilst the TT RS and RS3 were wholly designed, developed and engineered at Neckarsulm by quattro GmbH, they were manufactured alongside the non-RS Audi models, with the TT RS being manufactured at Győr, Hungary, by AUDI AG subsidiary Audi Hungaria Motor Kft.

quattro GmbH-produced cars from Neckarsulm can be identified by their specific 2nd and 3rd digit of the World Manufacturer Identifier section of the vehicles' Vehicle Identification Number (VIN) – quattro GmbH manufactured cars begin with 'WUA....', whereas cars produced by AUDI AG in Germany begin with 'WAU....'. The is variation between RS models in how many parts they share with the Audi range. wThe B8.5 RS5 sharing only a hood, roof, and doors with the A5. Likewise the race variants of Audi Sport vehicles are produced on the same line as the street variants with few modifications aside from safety features such as roll cage and other Motorsport necessities. The race car chassis are finished by hand in a separate facility five miles away. The R8 and R8 LMS race car share over fifty percent of their parts. The R8 engines are nearly 100% identical, meaning customers could race an entire season and be brought to a facility for revision and likewise the street cars were built to the same standard. Until the rebrand of Quattro gmbh into Audi Sport there existed a clear division in the companies handling of Motorsport. The factory efforts at Le Mans and DTM were handled by Audi Sport and the customer racing was managed by quattro gmbh. These two entities collaborated on the race cars in a technical and development sense but the work was done separately.

=== Audi R8 ===
The Audi R8 two-seat mid-engined sports car was exclusively designed and developed and is produced by quattro GmbH. An old factory on the Audi Neckarsulm site was redeveloped, and €28 million was invested in the new R8 production line. Around 250 employees work on this car.

The longitudinally oriented 4.2 litre Fuel Stratified Injection (FSI) V8 engine used in the R8, rated at 309 kW (420 PS; 414 bhp) and 430 N⋅m (317 lbf⋅ft) of torque, is shared from the B7 RS4 quattro, but modified to use a dry sump lubrication system and induction system.

A subsequent V10 engined version of the R8 is also available, using a de-tuned version of their sister company's 5.2-litre FSI V10, used in the Lamborghini Gallardo LP560-4. This variant produces 386 kW (525 PS; 518 bhp) and 530 N⋅m (391 lb⋅ft) of torque.

Furthermore, quattro GmbH unveiled a diesel engined R8 concept, the "R8 V12 TDI" (later renamed "R8 TDI Le Mans"). This was to use a 6.0-litre V12 engine, utilising Volkswagen Group's long-established Turbocharged Direct Injection (TDI) turbodiesel technology. This engine was rated at 368 kW (500 PS; 493 bhp) and 1,000 N⋅m (738 lbf⋅ft) of torque.

=== Audi Q7 V12 TDI quattro ===
quattro GmbH has developed the most powerful diesel powered sport utility vehicle (SUV) in its class. The Audi Q7 V12 TDI quattro is fitted with a V12 Turbocharged Direct Injection (TDI) internal combustion engine. A world first, this all new diesel engine displaces 6.0 litres, generating a motive power output of 368 kW (500 PS; 493 bhp) (measured according to Directive 80/1269/EEC) at 4,000 rpm, and 1,000 N⋅m (738 lbf⋅ft) of torque at 1,750–3,000 rpm. This allows it to accelerate from 0–100 km/h (0–62 mph) in 5.5 seconds. Top speed is electronically limited to 250 km/h (155.3 mph). quattro GmbH has developed this new engine using existing technology from Audi's Le Mans endurance racing program – the Audi R15 TDI.

== Motorsport ==
Audi re-entered motorsport for the first time since the Auto Union days in the 80s competing with success in Rally, IMSA, and DTM. Audi established quattro GmbH in 1983. Because Group B rally required homologation with road cars Audi created quattro GmbH to concept and help engineer ideas. The result of this was the Audi Sport Quattro, dubbed S1 in race trim. Audi AG produced the race variant, and the 200 street units required to compete in Group B. It wasn't until the 90s this responsibility was spun off into the quattro division in Neckersulm. quattro GmbH was responsible for the customer racing projects which built and sold racecars to professional and amateur racing teams and Audi Sport was responsible for factory efforts seen at Le Mans as well as providing support for special case customer teams such as WRT.

In 1988 Audi Sport produced the Audi 200 Trans Am to expose the brand to the wealthy US market where it had little presence. When it dominated the field and the governing body banned AWD, Audi Sport moved to IMSA and made the 700hp Audi 90 IMSA GTO. The following year Audi contracted Quattro to develop a DTM car to refocus on selling vehicles in Germany. The result was the Audi V8 DTM based on the Audi flagship model.

=== Audi RS3 TCR LMS ===
The entry level racecar beginning in 2016 was based on the Audi RS3. The RS3 LMS TCR features the EA888 2.0T engine largely unchanged from the Audi S3 and other models. This is due to engine regulations in the TCR which limits displacement. The LMS version has 350hp, 420N, and weighs 1245kg. The mk1 was available with an S-tronic dual clutch gearbox also featured largely unchanged from the street variant. In addition customers could opt for a straight cut sequential gearbox. The S-tronic proved very reliable and owners could expect to go several seasons between rebuilds, although the cost of the rebuild offset the easier to maintain and adjust SEQ box. In addition, the S-tronic had an inherent weight disadvantage, and in order to take advantage of BOP allowances S-tronic RS3 owners would often have to remove metal from the floor panel in the rear to offset the extra weight of the DCT. The S-tronic was discontinued for the second generation. The model was available for roughly $110k USD.

=== Audi R8 LMS GT3 ===
Audi Sport began to sell customers a 580hp GT3 variant of the R8. The model enjoyed great success until it was discontinued in 2024, while Audi Sport promised support for the model through 2030 the number of active R8s in GT3 series dwindled as Audi Sports logistical support, formerly one of the best in the scene suffered dramatically due to changes in company philosophy regarding electrification. R8s disappeared from the US racing scene in the early 2020s and soon numbers dwindled in Europe and Asia as well. Despite this the R8 won the pole position in the 2025 Nurburgring 24h.

The R8 V10 engine is almost completely unchanged from the street variant and over 50% of the parts of the vehicle as a whole are shared with the road model. By contrast the B8.5 RS5 shares only the hood, doors and roof with the Audi S4 and A4 its based on demonstrating the racing DNA present in the Audi Sport models. The R8 begins production in Neckarsulm and after all common parts are assembled they are loaded on to a flatbed and moved to a special AS facility 5 miles away for assembling the final motorsport touches such as roll cage and seats. Because the R8 V10 engines between street and race models are nearly 100% identical, customers could race an entire season and be brought to a facility for revision at a very reasonable price and likewise the street cars were built to the same standard meaning the R8 was more than capable of handling amateur track events.

As of 2025, it is unknown if the R8 will return to GT3 racing, but a third generation featuring a high revving 4.0T V8 engine is possible but unconfirmed.

== See also ==
- Audi in Formula One
- Audi A8 W12
- Audi Sport WRC results
- Ehra-Lessien – site of the Volkswagen Group proving ground
- Abt Sportsline, an independent tuning and motor racing company, specializing in Audi and other Volkswagen Group products
- List of German cars
