= Lost Planet 2.0 =

EP by Smokepurpp
- Released: May 10, 2019
- Length: 23:00
- Label: Alamo; Sony
- Producer: A-Lau; BHUNNA; Boys Noize; JetsonMade; Keith Allen; Kenny Beats; Lionel Nealy; Phlexnproductions; Rex Kudo; Smokepurpp; Thank You Fizzle; TM88; Tony Seltzer; TrePounds

Smokepurpp chronology
Lost Planet (2019)	Lost Planet 2.0 (2019)	Florida Jit (2020)

Lost Planet 2.0 is the extended version of the EP Lost Planet by American rapper Smokepurpp. It was released on May 10, 2019, by Alamo Records and Sony Music Entertainment.

It features guest appearances from frequent collaborator Lil Pump, NLE Choppa and Gunna.

== Background ==
In May 2019, Smokepurpp released Lost Planet 2.0, an extended version of his debut project Lost Planet. According to Revolt, the re-release included additional tracks and served as a continuation of the original project, showcasing Smokepurpp's versatility and growth as an artist.

Smokepurpp previously announced Lost Planet would arrive before he released DeadStar 2 but before we get the sequel for his debut project, he has something else in store. The rapper dropped off the visual for "Repeat" which revealed the release date for Lost Planet 2.0.

In addition to eight tracks from Lost Planet, three more were added: "Walk On Water", "Gucci Goggles", and "Type To".

== Track listing ==
No.	Title	Writer(s)	Producer(s)	Length
1.	"Baguettes" (featuring Gunna)	Omar Pineiro; A-Lau; Tony Seltzer; Gunna	Smokepurpp; Tony Seltzer; A-Lau	2:46
2.	"Repeat"	Omar Pineiro; Kenny Beats; Boys Noize	Boys Noize; Kenny Beats	2:01
3.	"3-8 Hot"	Pineiro; Lionel Nealy; Keith Allen; TrePounds	Lionel Nealy; Keith Allen; TrePounds	1:34
4.	"Chandelier" (featuring Lil Pump)	Thank You Fizzle; Smokepurpp; Lil Pump	Thank You Fizzle	2:26
5.	"Remember Me"	Siviwe Mngaza; Rex Kudo; TM88; Smokepurpp	Rex Kudo; TM88	2:24
6.	"Weapon"	JetsonMade; Smokepurpp	JetsonMade	1:53
7.	"Throw Away"	A-Lau; Kenny Beats; Smokepurpp	Kenny Beats; A-Lau	2:06
8.	"Double" (featuring NLE Choppa)	A-Lau; Tony Seltzer; NLE Choppa; Smokepurpp	A-Lau; Tony Seltzer	2:35
9.	"Walk on Water"	BHUNNA; Smokepurpp	BHUNNA	1:46
10.	"Gucci Goggles"	BHUNNA; Smokepurpp	BHUNNA; Phlexnproductions	2:17
11.	"Type To"	Tony Seltzer	Tony Seltzer; Smokepurpp	1:50
Total length:				23:00
