= Bless Yo Trap =

2018 collaborative mixtape by Smokepurpp and Murda Beatz

Mixtape by Smokepurpp and Murda Beatz
- Released: April 13, 2018
- Genres: Hip-hop; trap
- Length: 25:00
- Labels: Alamo; Interscope
- Producers: Murda Beatz (also exec.); Cubeatz; Felix Leone; Keanu Beats; OZ; Sool Got Hits; The Wave Beats

Smokepurpp chronology
Deadstar (2017)	Bless Yo Trap (2018)	Lost Planet (2019)

Murda Beatz chronology
Keep God First (2016)	Bless Yo Trap (2018)	Keep God First 2 (TBA)

Alternate cover
- Original album artwork, later replaced

Singles from Bless Yo Trap
- 1. "123" Released: March 2, 2018; 2. "Do Not Disturb" Released: March 28, 2018

Professional ratings
Review scores
Source	Rating
Pitchfork	4.8/10
HipHopDX	3.5/5 stars
Exclaim!	3/5 stars

Bless Yo Trap is a collaborative mixtape by American rapper Smokepurpp and Canadian record producer Murda Beatz, released on April 13, 2018, by Alamo and Interscope Records. The album features guest appearances, from Lil Yachty, Offset, and ASAP Ferg. It was supported by two singles: "123" and "Do Not Disturb".

== Track listing ==
Credits adapted from Tidal and BMI.

No.	Title	Writer(s)	Producer(s)	Length
1.	"123"	Omar Pineiro; Shane Lindstrom; Rasool Diaz	Murda Beatz; Sool Got Hits^{[a]}	2:50
2.	"Big Dope"	Pineiro; Lindstrom; Ozan Yildirim	Murda Beatz; OZ^{[a]}	2:35
3.	"Do Not Disturb" (featuring Lil Yachty and Offset)	Pineiro; Lindstrom; Diaz; Miles McCollum; Kiari Cephus	Murda Beatz; Sool Got Hits^{[a]}	2:37
4.	"Pockets"	Pineiro; Lindstrom; Keanu Torres; Jagraj Singh	Murda Beatz; Keanu Beats^{[a]}; The Wave Beats^{[a]}	3:13
5.	"Good Habits"	Pineiro; Lindstrom; Torres	Murda Beatz; Keanu Beats^{[a]}	1:18
6.	"Mayo"	Pineiro; Lindstrom; Diaz	Murda Beatz; Sool Got Hits^{[a]}	2:47
7.	"Pray" (featuring ASAP Ferg)	Pineiro; Lindstrom; Darold Brown	Murda Beatz	2:36
8.	"Bumblebee"	Pineiro; Lindstrom; Diaz	Murda Beatz; Diaz^{[a]}	2:00
9.	"Way"	Pineiro; Lindstrom; Kevin Gomringer; Tim Gomringer	Murda Beatz; Cubeatz^{[a]}	1:54
10.	"For the Gang"	Pineiro; Lindstrom; K. Gomringer; T. Gomringer	Murda Beatz; Cubeatz^{[a]}	1:39
11.	"Wokstar"	Pineiro; Lindstrom; Donald Patron	Murda Beatz; Felix Leone^{[a]}	1:29
Total length:				25:00

Notes

- ^{^[a]} signifies an uncredited co-producer.

== Charts ==
Chart (2018)	Peak position
Belgian Albums (Ultratop Flanders)	193
Canadian Albums (Billboard)	30
New Zealand Heatseeker Albums (RMNZ)	4
US Billboard 200	40
US Top R&B/Hip-Hop Albums (Billboard)	22
