= Deadstar (mixtape) =

2017 mixtape by Smokepurpp

Mixtape by Smokepurpp
- Released: September 29, 2017
- Genre: Hip-hop; trap
- Length: 48:16
- Label: Alamo; Interscope
- Producer: Frank Dukes; Harry Fraud; Ice Bream (Soundboi); Lowtone; Lusi; Nova; Ronny J; Slight; TM88

Smokepurpp chronology
Up Now, Fuck Next (2016)	Deadstar (2017)	Bless Yo Trap (2018)

Singles from Deadstar
- 1. "Audi." Released: May 19, 2017; 2. "Different Color Molly" Released: May 26, 2017; 3. "To the Moon" Released: June 2, 2017; 4. "OK" Released: July 28, 2017; 5. "Bless Yo Trap" Released: September 15, 2017

Deadstar is the debut commercial mixtape by American rapper Smokepurpp. It was released on September 29, 2017, by Alamo Records and Interscope Records. The mixtape features guest appearances from frequent collaborator Lil Pump, alongside Chief Keef, Yo Gotti, Juicy J, Travis Scott, and DRAM.

It was supported by five singles – "Audi.", "Different Color Molly", "To the Moon", "OK", and "Bless Yo Trap". In December 2019, a sequel to the mixtape was released, Deadstar 2.

== Artwork ==
A friend of Smokepurpp came up with the idea for the album art from infamous punk rock artist GG Allin. On Purpp's album cover, he's seen in a coffin, surrounded by newspapers, photos of himself, alcohol, and a lean bottle. This mimics an infamous photo of the punk rocker at his 1993 funeral.

== Singles ==
The lead single, "Audi.", was released on May 19, 2017. The second single, "Different Color Molly", was released on May 26, 2017. The third single, "To the Moon", was released on June 2, 2017. The fourth single, "OK", was released on July 28, 2017. The fifth and final single, "Bless Yo Trap", was released on September 15, 2017.

== Commercial performance ==
Deadstar debuted at number 42 on the US Billboard 200.

== Track listing ==
Credits were adapted from Tidal.

No.	Title	Writer(s)	Producer(s)	Length
1.	"I Don't Know You" (featuring Chief Keef and Yo Gotti)	Omar Pineiro; Keith Cozart; Mario Mims; Ronald Spence, Jr.	Ronny J	3:41
2.	"Drop"	Pineiro; Spence, Jr.	Ronny J	1:34
3.	"Audi."	Pineiro; Spence, Jr.	Ronny J	2:39
4.	"OK" (featuring Lil Pump)	Pineiro; Spence, Jr.; Gazzy Garcia	Ronny J	2:06
5.	"Streets Love Me" (featuring Juicy J)	Pineiro; Kamil Boguski; Jordan Houston	Ice Bream (Soundboi)	3:16
6.	"No Safety"	Pineiro; Spence, Jr.	Ronny J	2:06
7.	"Bless Yo Trap"	Pineiro; Boguski	Ice Bream (Soundboi)	1:55
8.	"Fingers Blue" (featuring Travis Scott)	Pineiro; Spence, Jr.; Jacques Webster II; Adam Feeney	Ronny J; Frank Dukes	3:14
9.	"Nose"	Pineiro; Spence, Jr.	Ronny J	1:34
10.	"Krispy Kreme"	Pineiro; Boguski	Ice Bream (Soundboi)	2:35
11.	"Topic"	Pineiro; Kyle Resto; Luis Cano	Lowtone; Lusi	2:00
12.	"Hold It"	Pineiro; Bryan Simmons	TM88	1:54
13.	"Count Up" (featuring DRAM)	Pineiro; Shelley Massenburg-Smith; Rory Quigley	Harry Fraud	3:35
14.	"Different Color Molly"	Pineiro; Mark Anderson	Slight	3:05
15.	"To the Moon"	Pineiro; Jeryn Peters	Nova	2:59
16.	"Phantom"	Pineiro; Spence, Jr.	Ronny J	2:25
17.	"RIP Max"	Pineiro; Peters	Nova	4:26
18.	"Purgatory"	Pineiro; Peters	Nova	3:12
Total length:				48:16

== Charts ==
Chart (2017)	Peak position
US Billboard 200	42
US Billboard Top R&B/Hip-Hop Albums	24
US Billboard Top Rap Albums	16
Billboard Canadian Albums	77
