= Dayo Audi =

English bodybuilder

- professional bodybuilder

Personal info
- Full name: Dayo Audifferen

Best statistics

Professional (Pro) career
- Best win: 2008 WBBF Mr Universe

Ekundayo Audifferen, better known as Dayo Audi, is a Nigerian-born British bodybuilder. He is a former NABBA International Mr World and won the WBBF Mr Universe title in 2008. He has lived in Doncaster, England.

== Early life and education ==
Audifferen grew up in Lagos, Nigeria, with an older brother and younger sister. In 1982, he moved to the UK for postgraduate studies in politics at the University of Aberdeen. His PhD thesis focused on the role of the Organisation of African Unity in regional conflict management. He later told The Daily Telegraph that he got into the sport of bodybuilding by chance.

== Career ==
In 1996, Audi took the NABBA Overall Mr Britain title. He went on to finish third in Men's Class 1 at the 1996 NABBA Mr Universe competition, only one point behind Sergei Ogorodnikov in second. By 1997, he was regarded as one of the top bodybuilders in the UK.

In August 2003, Audi competed at the Masters Olympia in the United States, representing England, and placed 11th. In 2008, he took the World Body Building Federation (WBBF) Overall Mr Universe title.

Dayo organised the 2009 England's Strongest Man event which took place in May at the Doncaster Dome.
