= Smokepurpp =

American rapper (born 1997)

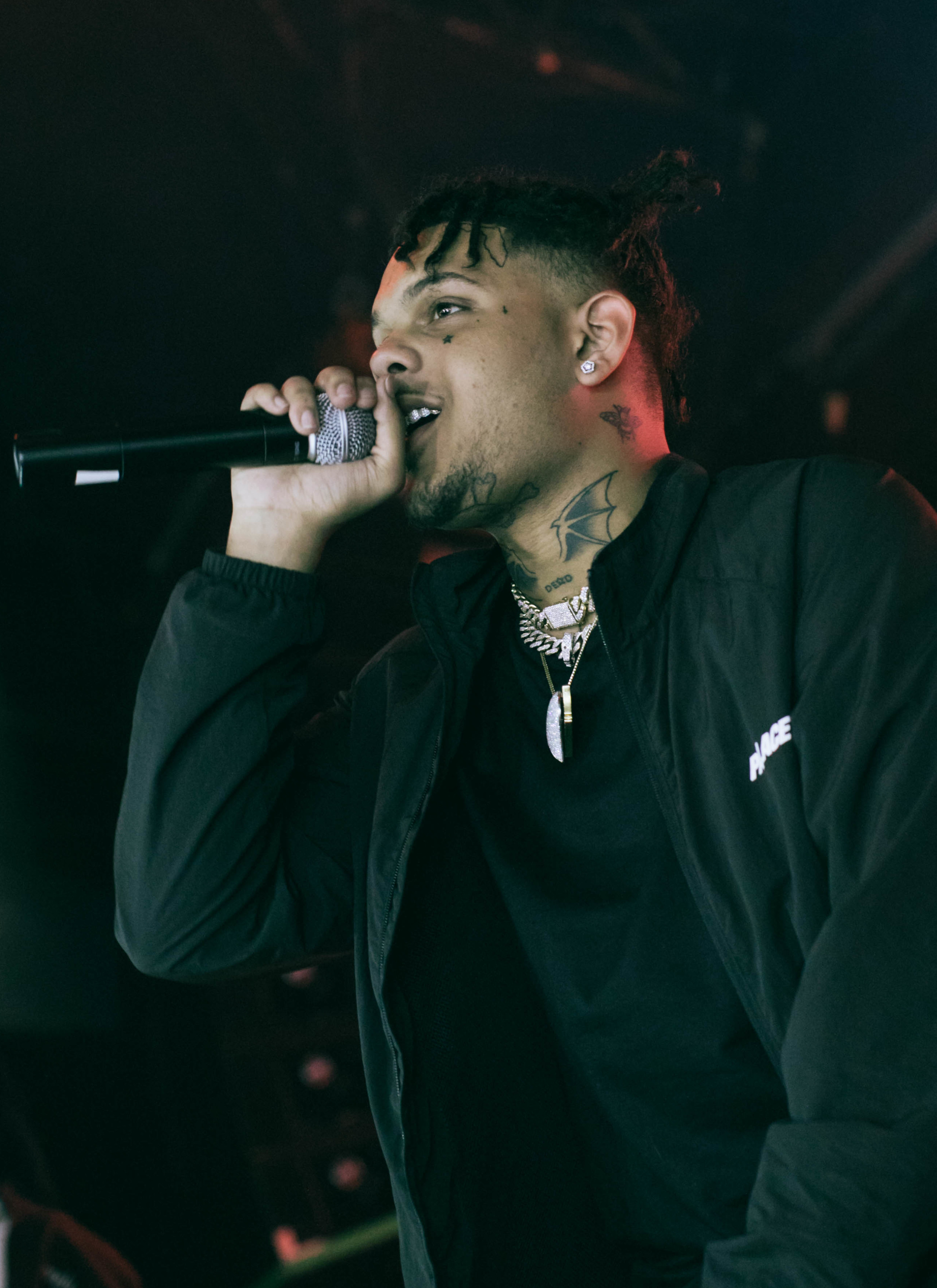
- Smokepurpp in 2018

Background information
- Also known as: Lil Home Invasion; Lil Purpp; Lil Water; Yung West
- Born: Omar Jeffery Pineiro; May 15, 1997 (age 29); Chicago, Illinois, U.S.
- Origin: Miami, Florida, U.S.
- Genres: Trap; punk rap; SoundCloud rap
- Occupations: Rapper; songwriter; record producer
- Years active: 2010–present
- Labels: Alamo; Geffen; Interscope; Cactus Jack (former)
- Website: deadstar2.com

Omar Jeffery Pineiro (born May 15, 1997), known professionally as Smokepurpp, is an American rapper, songwriter, and record producer. He rose to prominence through SoundCloud rap and released the single "Audi" in 2017, which was certified platinum by the Recording Industry Association of America (RIAA). In March 2017, he signed a recording contract with Alamo Records and Interscope Records. His debut commercial mixtape, Deadstar (2017), peaked at number 42 on the Billboard 200. His collaborative mixtape with Murda Beatz, Bless Yo Trap (2018), reached number 40 on the same chart. He was named to the 2018 XXL Freshman Class. His debut studio album, Deadstar 2 (2019), peaked at number 137 on the Billboard 200; his second studio album, Florida Jit, followed in 2020.

== Early life ==
Omar Jeffery Pineiro was born on May 15, 1997, in Chicago, Illinois, to Cuban parents. He and his family moved to Miami, Florida, when he was three years old. Speaking on his upbringing, Pineiro described himself during high school as a calm individual who surrounded himself with diverse groups of people.

His musical influences include Kanye West, Taking Back Sunday, Every Avenue, Young Thug, and Lucki.

== Career ==
=== 2014–2016: Early work ===
Pineiro began making music while in high school, initially producing instrumentals that he uploaded to SoundCloud. After finding little success selling his instrumentals, he began rapping and encouraged his friend and frequent collaborator Lil Pump to rap as well. Pineiro uploaded his first song to SoundCloud in 2015 but removed it soon afterward because he was dissatisfied with its quality. He subsequently uploaded "Live Off a Lick", featuring fellow Florida rapper XXXTentacion. Pineiro eventually dropped out of high school due to his budding music career. In November 2016, he released the EP Up Now Fuck Next.

=== 2017–2018: Breakthrough success and charting albums ===
In March 2017, Pineiro signed a recording deal with Alamo Records and Interscope Records. He announced plans for his debut commercial mixtape on Twitter on March 8, 2017. Five days later, Pineiro announced that the mixtape would be titled Deadstar.

Pineiro released his commercial debut single, "Audi", in May 2017. By October 2017, "Audi" had accumulated more than 25 million plays on SoundCloud and 122 million streams on Spotify. In September 2017, Pineiro announced that the release date for Deadstar was September 22, releasing the single "Bless Yo Trap" following the announcement. Pineiro announced later on that Deadstar would be delayed.

On September 29, 2017, Deadstar was released commercially. The mixtape includes features from artists such as Chief Keef, Juicy J, and Travis Scott. The mixtape debuted at number 42 on the Billboard 200. On November 8, 2017, Pineiro appeared on MTV's Total Request Live, where he announced a collaborative mixtape with Murda Beatz titled Bless Yo Trap. He later released two singles from the mixtape called "123" and "Do Not Disturb", the latter of which features Lil Yachty and Offset. The mixtape was released on April 13, 2018. In June 2018, Pineiro was included in the XXL Freshman Class.

During an interview with Nardwuar the Human Serviette at South by Southwest in March 2018, Pineiro discussed plans for projects titled Sound of Space (later retitled Lost Planet) and Deadstar 2.

=== 2019–2021: Deadstar 2, Florida Jit, and Psycho ===
On April 19, 2019, Pineiro released his EP Lost Planet via Alamo Records. The EP includes guest appearances from Gunna, Lil Pump, and NLE Choppa. On December 13, he released his debut studio album, Deadstar 2, after many delays. The album peaked at number 137 on the Billboard 200 and number 86 on the Canadian Albums Chart.

Pineiro released his second studio album, Florida Jit, on June 19, 2020. On February 10, 2021, he released the six-track EP Psycho (Legally Insane), featuring Lil Mosey.

=== 2022–present: Anti and later releases ===
In February 2023, Pineiro released the three-track EP Anti, comprising "Draco", "Chop Off the Top", and "Out My Body".

On June 14, 2025, Pineiro and Lil Pump performed at MTS Live Hall in Moscow, Russia.

In 2026, he released the singles "7am in Broward", "SH00T M3", and "She Da Birthday" through Alamo Records .

== Discography ==
=== Studio albums ===
Studio albums and selected details
Title	Album details	Peak chart positions	
Title	Album details	US	CAN
Deadstar 2	Released: December 13, 2019; Label: Alamo, Interscope; Format: Digital download	137	86
Florida Jit	Released: June 19, 2020; Label: Alamo, Interscope; Format: Digital download	—	—
"—" denotes a recording that did not chart or was not released in that territory.

=== Extended plays ===
List of extended plays and selected details
Title	Extended play details
Up Now Fuck Next	Originally released: November 22, 2016; Digital reissue: May 12, 2017; Reissue label: Alamo, Interscope; Format: Digital download
Lost Planet	Released: April 19, 2019; Label: Alamo, Interscope; Format: Digital download
Lost Planet 2.0	Released: May 10, 2019; Label: Alamo, Sony Music Entertainment; Format: Digital download
PSYCHO (Legally Insane)	Released: February 10, 2021; Label: Alamo, Interscope; Format: Digital download
Anti	Released: February 7, 2023; Label: Alamo, Sony Music; Format: Digital download

=== Mixtapes ===
List of mixtapes, with selected details
Title	Album details	Peak chart positions					
Title	Album details	US	US R&B/HH	US Rap	BEL (FL)	CAN	NZ Heat.
Deadstar	Released: September 29, 2017; Label: Alamo, Interscope; Formats: Digital download	42	24	16	—	77	—
Bless Yo Trap (with Murda Beatz)	Released: April 13, 2018; Label: Alamo, Interscope; Formats: Digital download	40	22	17	193	30	4
"—" denotes a recording that did not chart or was not released in that territory.

=== Singles ===
==== As lead artist ====
Title	Year	Peak chart positions				Certifications	Album
Title	Year	US Bub.	US R&B/HH Bub.	CAN	NZ Hot	Certifications	Album
"Glock In My Benz"	2017	—	—	—	—		Non-album singles
"Ski Mask"	2017	—	—	—	—		Non-album singles
"Audi"	2017	—	8	—	—	RIAA: Platinum; RMNZ: Gold	Deadstar
"123" (with Murda Beatz)	2018	19	4	—	—		Bless Yo Trap
"Do Not Disturb" (with Murda Beatz featuring Offset and Lil Yachty)	2018	—	—	—	—	RIAA: Gold	Bless Yo Trap
"Nephew" (featuring Lil Pump)	2018	5	1	96	—	RIAA: Gold	Non-album single
"Remember Me"	2019	—	—	—	—		Lost Planet
"Stevie"	2019	—	—	—	—		Deadstar 2
"Dirty Dirty" (featuring Lil Skies)	2019	—	—	—	37		Deadstar 2
"Audi II"	2019	—	—	—	—		Deadstar 2
"What I Please" (featuring Denzel Curry)	2019	—	—	—	30		Deadstar 2
"Off My Chest" (featuring Lil Pump)	2020	—	—	—	—		Florida Jit
"Big Dawg" (featuring Rick Ross)	2020	—	—	—	—		Florida Jit
"Said a Lotta Things"	2020	—	—	—	—		Non-album singles
"Gelato" (with Eladio Carrión and Duki, featuring Hide Miyabi)	2020	—	—	—	—		Non-album singles
"Birdz" (with Wuki)	2021	—	—	—	—		Non-album singles
"Mosh" (with Nghtmre)	2021	—	—	—	—		Non-album singles
"Tesla" (with Lil Pump)	2023	—	—	—	—		Lil Pump 2
"She Da Birthday"	2026	—	—	—	—		Non-album single
"—" denotes a recording that did not chart or was not released in that territory.

==== As featured artist ====
Title	Year	Peak chart positions							Certifications	Album
Title	Year	US	US R&B/HH	CAN	IRE	NZ Hot	SCO	UK	Certifications	Album
"KILO" (Lil Pump featuring Smokepurpp)	2016	—	—	—	—	—	—	—		Non-album singles
"Johnny" (Lil Pump featuring Smokepurpp)	2016	—	—	—	—	—	—	—		Non-album singles
"Bullshit (Kickstand)" (Lil Pump featuring Smokepurpp and Warholss)	2016	—	—	—	—	—	—	—		Non-album singles
"Broke My Wrist" (Lil Pump featuring Smokepurpp)	2016	—	—	—	—	—	—	—		Non-album singles
"Movin" (Lil Pump featuring Smokepurpp)	2017	—	—	—	—	—	—	—		Non-album singles
"OK" (Lil Pump featuring Smokepurpp)	2017	—	—	—	—	—	—	—		Non-album singles
"Bankteller" (Lil Pump featuring Desto Dubb, Lil Uzi Vert, 03 Greedo, and Smokepurpp)	2018	—	—	—	—	—	—	—		Non-album singles
"Purpple Hearts" (Diablo featuring Lil Xan and Smokepurpp)	2019	—	—	—	—	—	—	—		Non-album singles
"Costa Rica" (Dreamville featuring Bas, JID, Mez, Buddy, Jace, Reese Laflare, Ski Mask the Slump God, Guapdad 4000, and Smokepurpp)	2019	75	30	71	—	—	—	—	RIAA: Platinum; RMNZ: Gold	Revenge of the Dreamers III
"Body Bag" (Ricky Remedy featuring Smokepurpp and Zay27)	2019	—	—	—	—	—	—	—		Non-album single
"Poppin" (KSI featuring Lil Pump and Smokepurpp)	2020	—	—	—	52	13	25	43		Dissimulation
"On Go" (Scru Face Jean featuring Smokepurpp and DizzyEight)	2021	—	—	—	—	—	—	—		Village Boy
"Pizzeria" (Yuno Miles featuring Smokepurpp)	2024	—	—	—	—	—	—	—		Non-album single
"UCHIDA1" (Ginta, ODAKEi, DJ Ricky Luna featuring Smokepurpp)	2024	—	—	—	—	—	—	—		Non-album single
"—" denotes a recording that did not chart or was not released in that territory.
