= Audi Sport WRC results =

The table below shows results of Audi Sport during their time in the World Rally Championship.

== Group B era (1981–1986) ==
Year	Car	Driver	1	2	3	4	5	6	7	8	9	10	11	12	13	WDC	Points	WMC	Points
1981	Audi Quattro	(Finland) Hannu Mikkola	MON; Ret	SWE; 1	POR; Ret	KEN	FRA; Ret	GRC; Ret	ARG	BRA	FIN; 3	ITA; 4	CIV	GBR; 1		3rd	62	5th	63
1981	Audi Quattro	(France) Michèle Mouton	MON; Ret	SWE	POR; 4	KEN	FRA; Ret	GRC; Ret	ARG	BRA	FIN; 13	ITA; 1	CIV	GBR; Ret		8th	30	5th	63
1981	Audi Quattro	(Austria) Franz Wittmann	MON	SWE	POR	KEN	FRA	GRC; DSQ	ARG	BRA	FIN; Ret	ITA	CIV	GBR		-	0	5th	63
1981	Audi Quattro	(Italy) Michele Cinotto	MON	SWE	POR	KEN	FRA	GRC	ARG	BRA	FIN	ITA; Ret	CIV	GBR		-	0	5th	63
1982	Audi Quattro	(France) Michèle Mouton	MON; Ret	SWE; 5	POR; 1	KEN	FRA; 7	GRC; 1	NZL; Ret	BRA; 1	FIN; Ret	ITA; 4	CIV; Ret	GBR; 2		2nd	97	1st	116
1982	Audi Quattro	(Finland) Hannu Mikkola	MON; 2	SWE; 16	POR; Ret	KEN	FRA; Ret	GRC; Ret	NZL; Ret	BRA; Ret	FIN; 1	ITA; 2	CIV; Ret	GBR; 1		3rd	70	1st	116
1982	Audi Quattro	(Italy) Michele Cinotto	MON; Ret	SWE	POR	KEN	FRA	GRC; Ret	NZL	BRA	FIN	ITA; 6	CIV	GBR		33rd	6	1st	116
1982	Audi Quattro	(Sweden) Stig Blomqvist	MON	SWE; 1	POR	KEN	FRA	GRC	NZL	BRA	FIN; 2	ITA; 1	CIV	GBR		4th	58	1st	116
1982	Audi Quattro	(Austria) Franz Wittmann	MON	SWE	POR; 3	KEN	FRA; Ret	GRC	NZL	BRA	FIN	ITA; Ret	CIV	GBR		15th	12	1st	116
1982	Audi Quattro	(Germany) Harald Demuth	MON	SWE	POR	KEN	FRA	GRC	NZL	BRA	FIN	ITA; Ret	CIV	GBR; 5		26th	8	1st	116
1983	Audi Quattro A1	(Finland) Hannu Mikkola	MON; 4	SWE; 1	POR; 1	KEN; 2										1st	125	2nd	116
1983	Audi Quattro A2	(Finland) Hannu Mikkola					FRA; Ret	GRC; Ret	NZL; Ret	ARG; 1	FIN; 1	ITA; Ret	CIV; 2	GBR; 2		1st	125	2nd	116
1983	Audi Quattro A1	(France) Michèle Mouton	MON; Ret	SWE; 4	POR; 2	KEN; 3										5th	53	2nd	116
1983	Audi Quattro A2	(France) Michèle Mouton					FRA; Ret	GRC; Ret	NZL; Ret	ARG; 3	FIN; 16	ITA; 7	CIV	GBR; Ret		5th	53	2nd	116
1983	Audi Quattro A1	(Sweden) Stig Blomqvist	MON; 3		POR; Ret	KEN	FRA									4th	89	2nd	116
1983	Audi 80 Quattro	(Sweden) Stig Blomqvist		SWE; 2												4th	89	2nd	116
1983	Audi Quattro A2	(Sweden) Stig Blomqvist						GRC; 3	NZL; DSQ	ARG; 2	FIN; 2	ITA; Ret	CIV	GBR; 1		4th	89	2nd	116
1983	Audi Quattro A1	(Kenya) Vic Preston jr.	MON	SWE	POR	KEN; Ret	FRA	GRC	NZL	ARG	FIN	ITA	CIV	GBR		-	0	2nd	116
1983	Audi Quattro A2	(Kenya) Shekhar Mehta	MON	SWE	POR	KEN	FRA	GRC	NZL	ARG; 4	FIN	ITA	CIV	GBR		9th	26	2nd	116
1983	Audi Quattro A2	(Argentina) Luis Di Palma	MON	SWE	POR	KEN	FRA	GRC	NZL	ARG; Ret	FIN	ITA	CIV	GBR		-	0	2nd	116
1983	Audi Quattro A2	(France) Bernard Darniche	MON	SWE	POR	KEN	FRA	GRC	NZL	ARG	FIN	ITA; 9	CIV	GBR		50th	2	2nd	116
1983	Audi Quattro A2	(Finland) Lasse Lampi	MON	SWE	POR	KEN	FRA	GRC	NZL	ARG	FIN	ITA	CIV; Ret	GBR		8th	26	2nd	116
1984	Audi Quattro A2	(Sweden) Stig Blomqvist	MON; 2	SWE; 1	POR; Ret	KEN; Ret	FRA; 5	GRC; 1	NZL; 1	ARG; 1	FIN; 4					1st	133	1st	120
1984	Audi Sport Quattro	(Sweden) Stig Blomqvist										ITA; Ret	CIV; 1	GBR		1st	133	1st	120
1984	Audi Quattro A2	(Finland) Hannu Mikkola	MON; 3	SWE	POR; 1	KEN; 3	FRA	GRC; 2	NZL; 3	ARG; 2			CIV; 2	GBR; 2		2nd	133	1st	120
1984	Audi Sport Quattro	(Finland) Hannu Mikkola									FIN; Ret	ITA				2nd	133	1st	120
1984	Audi Quattro A2	(Germany) Walter Röhrl	MON; 1	SWE	POR; 6	KEN			NZL; Ret	ARG	FIN					11th	26	1st	120
1984	Audi Sport Quattro	(Germany) Walter Röhrl					FRA; Ret	GRC; Ret				ITA; Ret	CIV	GBR		11th	26	1st	120
1984	Audi Quattro A2	(France) Michèle Mouton	MON	SWE; 2	POR	KEN; Ret	FRA									12th	25	1st	120
1984	Audi Sport Quattro	(France) Michèle Mouton						GRC; Ret	NZL	ARG	FIN; Ret	ITA	CIV	GBR; 4		12th	25	1st	120
1984	Audi Quattro A2	(South Africa) Sarel van der Merwe	MON	SWE	POR; Ret	KEN	FRA	GRC	NZL	ARG	FIN	ITA	CIV	GBR		-	0	1st	120
1984	Audi Quattro A2	(Argentina) Jorge Recalde	MON	SWE	POR	KEN	FRA	GRC	NZL	ARG; 3	FIN	ITA	CIV	GBR		16th	12	1st	120
1985	Audi Sport Quattro	(Sweden) Stig Blomqvist	MON; 4	SWE; 2	POR; 4	KEN; Ret	FRA	GRC; 2	NZL; 4	ARG; Ret	FIN; 2	ITA	CIV	GBR		2nd	75	2nd	126
1985	Audi Sport Quattro	(Germany) Walter Röhrl	MON; 2	SWE; Ret	POR; 3	KEN	FRA; Ret	GRC; Ret	NZL; 3	ARG	FIN	ITA; 1	CIV	GBR; Ret		3rd	59	2nd	126
1985	Audi Sport Quattro	(Finland) Hannu Mikkola	MON	SWE; 4	POR	KEN; Ret	FRA	GRC	NZL	ARG	FIN; Ret	ITA	CIV	GBR; Ret		22nd	10	2nd	126
1985	Audi Sport Quattro	(France) Michèle Mouton	MON	SWE	POR	KEN	FRA	GRC	NZL	ARG	FIN	ITA	CIV; Ret	GBR		-	0	2nd	126
1985	Audi Sport Quattro	(Germany) Franz Braun	MON	SWE	POR	KEN	FRA	GRC	NZL	ARG	FIN	ITA	CIV; Ret	GBR		-	0	2nd	126
1986	Audi Sport Quattro E2	(Germany) Walter Röhrl	MON; 4	SWE	POR; Ret	KEN	FRA	GRC	NZL	ARG	FIN	CIV	ITA	GBR	USA	22nd	10	4th	29
1986	Audi Sport Quattro E2	(Finland) Hannu Mikkola	MON; 3	SWE	POR	KEN	FRA	GRC	NZL	ARG	FIN	CIV	ITA	GBR	USA	18th	12	4th	29
1986	Audi 90 Quattro	(Sweden) Mikael Ericsson	MON	SWE; 4	POR	KEN	FRA	GRC	NZL	ARG	FIN	CIV	ITA	GBR	USA	8th	28	4th	29
1986	Audi Sport Quattro E2	(Sweden) Gunnar Pettersson	MON	SWE; 5	POR	KEN	FRA	GRC	NZL	ARG	FIN	CIV	ITA	GBR	USA	29th	8	4th	29
1986	Audi 80 Quattro	(Austria) Rudolf Stohl	MON	SWE	POR	KEN; Ret	FRA	GRC	NZL	ARG	FIN	CIV	ITA	GBR	USA	15th	16	4th	29

== Group A era (1987) ==
Year	Car	Driver	1	2	3	4	5	6	7	8	9	10	11	12	13	WDC	Points	WMC	Points
1987	Audi 200 Quattro	(Finland) Hannu Mikkola	MON	SWE	POR	KEN; 1	FRA	GRE; 3	USA	NZL	ARG	FIN; Ret	CIV	ITA	GBR	8th	32	2nd	82
1987	Audi 200 Quattro	(Germany) Walter Röhrl	MON; 3	SWE	POR	KEN; 2	FRA	GRE; Ret	USA	NZL	ARG	FIN	CIV	ITA	GBR	11th	27	2nd	82
1987	Audi Coupé Quattro	(Austria) Rudi Stohl	MON; Ret	SWE	POR; 7	KEN; 7	FRA	GRE; 9	USA	NZL	ARG	FIN	CIV; Ret	ITA; 16	GBR	30th	10	2nd	82
1987	Audi Coupé Quattro	(Italy) Paolo Alessandrini	MON	SWE	POR	KEN	FRA	GRE; Ret	USA; 5	NZL	ARG	FIN	CIV	ITA	GBR	29th*	10*	2nd	82
1987	Audi Coupé Quattro	(United Kingdom) David Llewellin	MON	SWE	POR	KEN	FRA	GRE	USA	NZL	ARG	FIN	CIV	ITA; 17	GBR; 6	31st	8	2nd	82
1987	Audi Coupé Quattro	(United States) John Buffum	MON	SWE	POR	KEN	FRA	GRE	USA; Ret	NZL	ARG	FIN	CIV	ITA	GBR	-	0	2nd	82
