= Aude (disambiguation) =

- Gender: Female
- Language: French

Aude is a department in south-central France named after the river.

Aude may refer to:

- Aude (river), a river of southwestern France, after which the department is named
- the former Catholic Diocese of Aude during the revolutionary republic
- Lac d'Aude, a lake of southwestern France

unrelated

- Aude, Estonia, a village in Saue Parish, Harju County, Estonia
- 9117 Aude, a main-belt asteroid discovered in 1997

== People ==
=== Given name ===
- Aude Massot (born 1983), French comic book author
- Aude Clavier (born 1999), French steeplechase runner

=== Surname ===
- Aude (writer) (1947–2012), the pen name of Canadian writer Claudette Charbonneau-Tissot
- Dave Audé (born 1969), American producer, house DJ and remixer
- Erik Audé (born 1980), American actor, stuntman, and professional poker player
- Jorge Aude (born 1946), Uruguayan former football player and manager
- Joseph Aude (1755–1841), French writer
- Julián Aude (born 2003), Argentine footballer
- Rich Aude (born 1971), American former Major League Baseball player
- Susan Audé (born 1952), American television news anchor

=== Fictional ===
- Aude (character), the sister of Oliver and betrothed of Roland in "The Song of Roland" and other chansons de gestes

== See also ==
- Audes, France
- Sapere aude ("dare to be wise"), a Latin phrase
