= Umar Jauro Audi =

Nigerian politician (1967–2020)

Reps, Bayo Constituency
- In office 2015–2020
- Constituency: Bayo
- In office 2015–2020

Personal details
- Born: 1967 Borno State
- Died: 2020 (aged 52–53) Maiduguri
- Party: All Progressive Congress (APC)
- Occupation: Politician

Umar Audi (born 1967) was a Nigerian politician and a former member Borno State House of Representatives representing Bayo constituency.

== Political career ==
Audi entered politics and became a member of the Borno State House of Assembly, where he represented Bayo State Constituency. He contested elections under the All Progressives Congress (APC). He served in the Borno State House of Assembly until his death in 2020.

== Death ==
He died of COVID-19 complications in May 2020.
