= Audium (theater) =

Sound art event in San Francisco

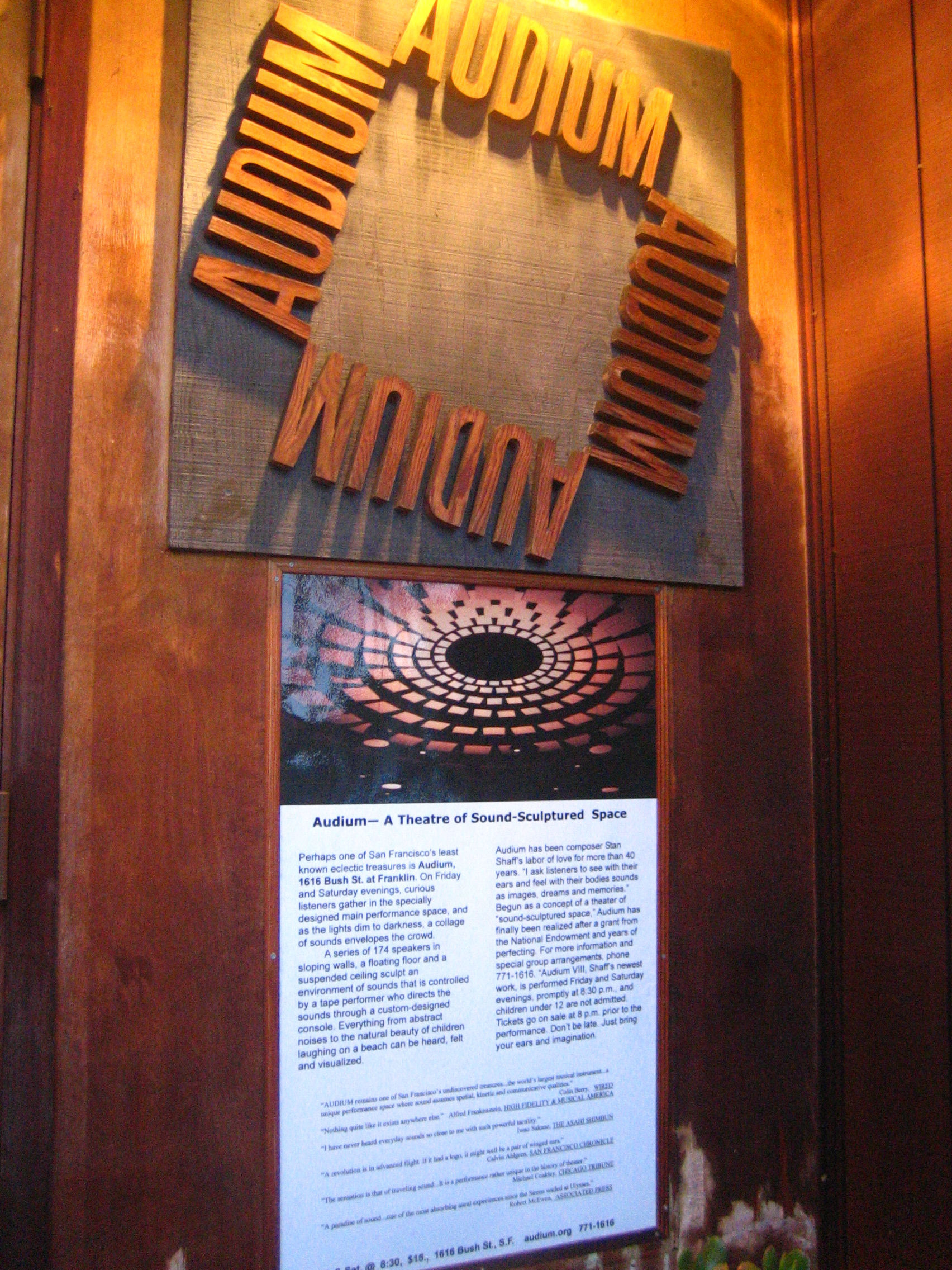
Sign outside the theater

Audium is a sound art event that has been presented weekly in San Francisco since 1967. Audium is a creation of composer Stan Shaff that is performed on original equipment designed by Doug McEachern. It is played in a completely dark theater designed to heighten the spatial effects of sound and for "choreographing sound in space." Compositions are developed from acoustic and electronic instruments and from sounds of the natural world used as metaphors. Works are "sculpted" in space through 176 speakers.

== Early development ==
The concepts gradually refined in Audium began with Shaff and McEachern's experimental electronic music performances in the late 1950s and early 1960s. In 1959, Stan Shaff met fellow musician and teacher Douglas McEachern, whose background in electronics enabled him to develop original equipment systems for live, spatial performances. Prior to Audium, Shaff and McEachern worked with Anna Halprin's Dancer's Workshop and Shaff worked with Seymour Locks, an artist and the originator of the overhead projected light show later used widely at rock concerts in the 1960s. Shaff was also associated with the Tape Music Center in San Francisco. Early presentations were done at University of California Extension (1960), San Francisco State College (1962) and San Francisco Museum of Art (1963, 1964). These early performances were done with "portable systems" that had about 8 to 16 speakers.

== The first theater ==
To proceed with experimenting and with exploring these ideas, McEachern and Shaff, in 1965, leased a hall at 309 4th Avenue in San Francisco and began adapting it to become the first Audium theater. It initially was outfitted with 44 speakers, and on May 26, 1967, the first public performance was held. By 1968 the number of speakers had increased to 61. Weekly performances were presented until October 1970. The theater had to close when the lease ended and the building was sold.

== The second theater ==
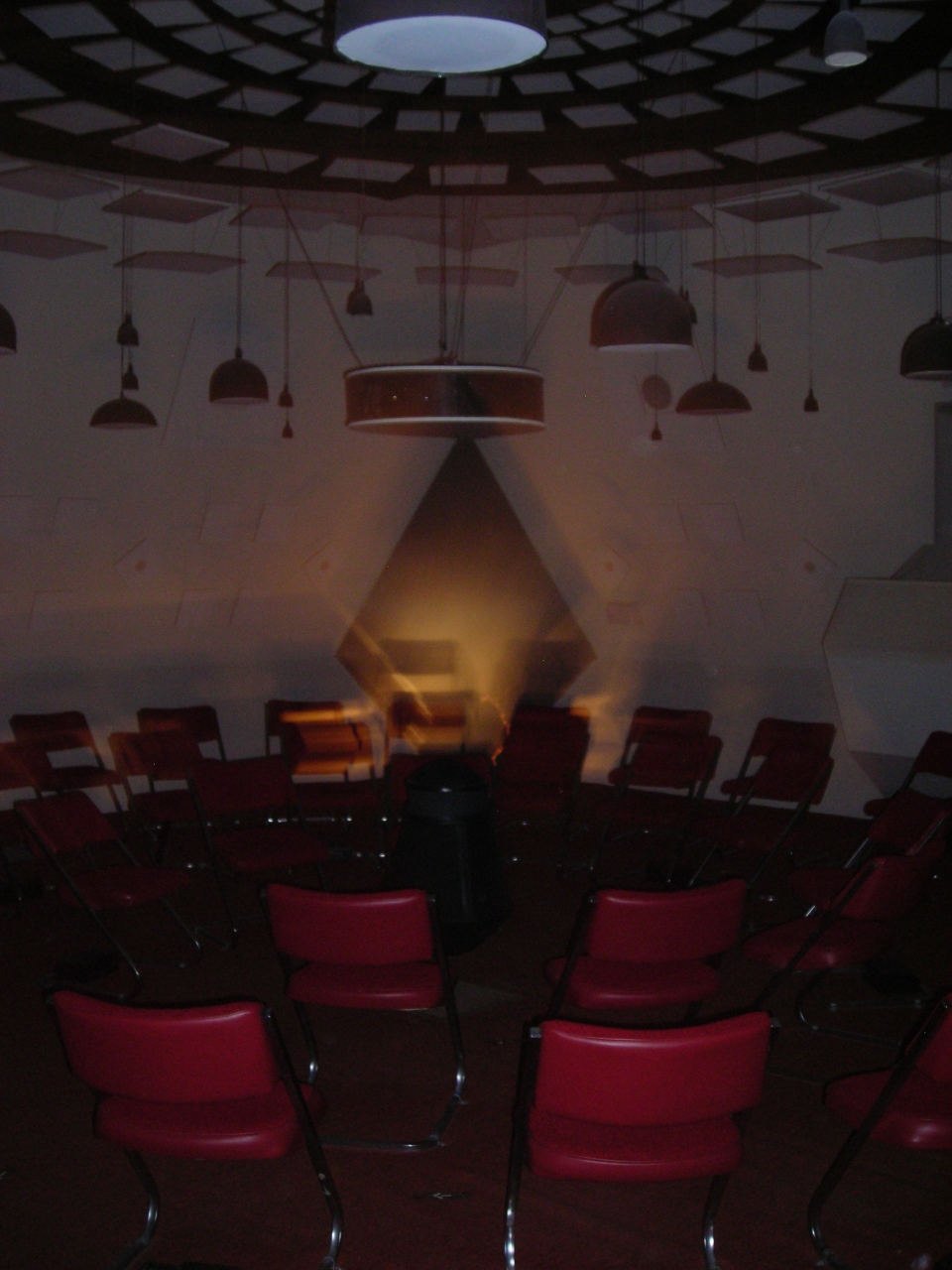
Theater with speakers

In 1972 Shaff received a grant from National Endowment for the Arts. A storefront, formerly a bakery, in downtown San Francisco was purchased and subsequently converted to a theater. The first public presentation was October 31, 1975, and weekend shows have continued since then. Beginning with 136 speakers, the phenomenon has gradually and unrelentingly grown and evolved. It now has over 176 speakers, and Stan Shaff presents his 11th opus with his son, David Shaff, every weekend, opening at 8 PM. Since 2021, Audium has provided yearly residency programs for composers and sound artists, primarily focusing on minority artists.

== Attendance & acclaim ==
The performances have been described as "surreal" and one piece as a "musique concrete of beach sounds, faintly overheard conversations and outdated Moog synthesizer whirls and chortles." Another author said that Audium harnesses "the primal essence of sound" and that after a performance "you'll emerge uncertain, excitable, outside of yourself." According to Shaff, Audium is periodically visited by members of Walt Disney Imagineering, the R&D arm of the Walt Disney Company, engineers from Dolby Laboratories, sound engineers from the film industry, the Audio Engineering Society, and composers from international universities. Shaff has done very little advertising, but after ongoing programs since 1967, Audium now attracts weekly listeners from around the world.
