= Audi Channel =

- Country: United Kingdom
- Broadcast area: UK; Ireland

Programming
- Language(s): British English
- Picture format: 4:3, 576i (SDTV)

Ownership
- Owner: Audi AG

History
- Launched: 30 September 2005
- Closed: 1 August 2009

The Audi Channel was a digital satellite television channel, launched in the UK in 2005 by the German car company Audi. It was broadcast free-to-air via Sky Digital, which is generally receivable in the United Kingdom, and Ireland (although the Sky Digital output is also receivable in many mainland European countries). The Audi Channel was broadcast in the 4:3 aspect ratio, in standard definition.

== History ==
The channel was developed by advertising agency Bartle Bogle Hegarty, and made Audi the first advertiser in Europe to launch a self-promotional channel.

== Programmes ==
The channel featured a variety of programmes, including "user-guide" information about Audi's vehicles, in-depth model profiles, test drives, celebrity interviews, historic features, new product launches, professional driving tuition, dealership profiles, coverage of sporting events sponsored by Audi, including the "science of sport", and each round of the DTM - the German Touring Car Championship.

== Channel closure ==
The channel closed at midnight on 1 August 2009.

== Similar channels ==
Audi Worldwide also have a web-only stream, called "Audi tv". It can be found at https://web.archive.org/web/20080507211746/http://tv.audi.com/.
