= Ahmad Audi Zarewa =

Nigerian politician

Member of the House of Representatives
- In office From 2007 to 2011 – 2011 to 2015
- Constituency: Kano state

Personal details
- Born: Kano State
- Occupation: Politician

Ahmad Audi Zarewa is a Nigerian politician from Kano State who represented the Karaye/Rogo constituency in the House of Representatives at the National Assembly. He was initially elected in 2007, serving until 2011, and then re-elected in 2011, holding office until 2015 as a member of the People's Democratic Party (PDP). He was succeeded by Usman Shehu in 2015.

== Early life ==
Ahmad Audi Zarewa was born in Kano State, Nigeria.

== Career ==
Zarewa was a member of Nigeria's National Assembly, serving in the House of Representatives from 2007 to 2011 and again from 2011 to 2015. He was succeeded by Usman Shehu after completing his term in 2015, having previously been preceded by Shehu Aliyu Yemmedi.
