= Graeme Lancefield =

Australian bodybuilder

Graeme Lancefield is a retired Australian bodybuilder best known for winning the 1991 NABBA Masters Mr Universe and the 1978 Mr Australia. He is no longer with NABBA International.

He is the current President of [Mr Australia - WFF Australia] and World President of [World Fitness Federation - WFF] International.
