= Audi Y Zentimiento =

American singer-songwriter

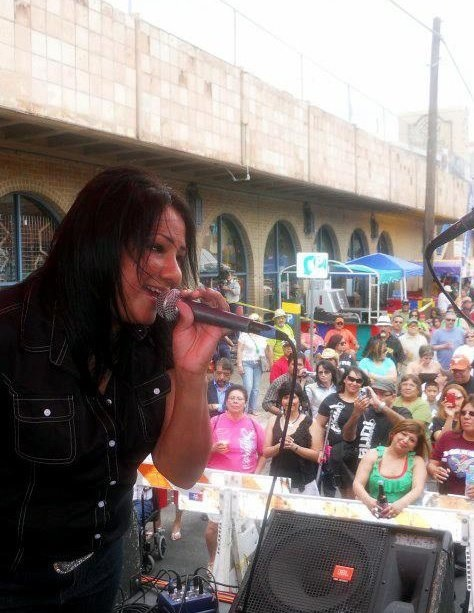
- Performing at Tejano Fan Fair

Background information
- Also known as: Audi Castillon Portales
- Born: Maria Concepcion Castillon; July 1, 1971 (age 54); Fort Collins, Colorado, United States
- Origin: Fort Collins, Colorado, United States
- Genres: Tejano
- Occupations: Singer, songwriter
- Instrument: Vocals
- Years active: 1990s–present
- Label: Audi Y Audi LLC
- Website: www.audiyzentimiento.com

Audi Castillon Portales (born July 1, 1971), known by her stage name Audi Y Zentimiento, is an American singer-songwriter. Starting in the early 2000s, Castillon was nominated for Tejano Music Awards for Best New Female Artist and Best New Group. She was also nominated for Tejano Globe Awards for Best New Female Artist, Best Online Popularity and Best New Group. She then started her own Record Company Audi Y Audi LLC. She has performed at multiple venues as an artist in, Nebraska, Texas, and Colorado.

== Career ==
"Maria Concepcion (Audi) Castillon" was born on July 1, 1971, in Fort Collins, Colorado. Audi and her brothers Eloy Castillon, Elias Castillon II, and Nephews Lonnie Castillon and Elias Castillon III, formed the group "Destino" in 1992. The following year, "Destino" had gone through Drummers and then after about 3 years the family decided to stop the band. Audi left in 1995, and continued with another band "Fifth Generation". The following year, Audi left the band in favor of playing with "Heavenbound" Christian Rock Latin Rock Band where Castillon stayed for about 15 years. Still having Tejano in her heart she decided to work on a project with Grupo Dominazion De Abdon Espinoza Jr, then came the opportunity for Audi to record her first Audi Y Zentimiento album with Grammy Award winners Max Baca Y Los Texmaniacs. She was then nominated in the first stages (public vote) for Tejano Music Awards for Best new Artist, Best Duo, Best New Group. In 2013, Castillon signed a recording contract with Escogido Records in hopes of a More Diverse, Latin, Tejano, Conjunto album / image. Castillon is currently working on her new album titled: " Este Amor Puro ".

Castillon also writes songs that are featured on her albums. In 2011, Max Baca Y Los Texmaniacs, Gabriel Zavala, Ram Herrera Josh Baca, Rick Fuentes, and Rebecca Valadez joined her in the recording of her album "Donde Andaras". 6 of her singles on, Donde Andaras (2011), peaked at number 1 on the Tejano Music Charts. Her newest album, Este Amor Puro (2014), will release early 2014, with producers such as Shelly Lares, Grammy Award Winners Max Baca Y Los Texmaniacs, Rick Fuentes & More. Her Ballada/Mariachi Rendition "Demasiado Tarde" featuring, Joanna Castillon peaked at number 1 on the Tejano Music Charts Her latest single, "Este Amor Puro", peaked at number 1 on the Tejano Music Charts. All of her single releases have been aired on Tejano Y Mas, Univision, Univision Radio, Tejano in the mixx, KXTN Tejano & Proud, Tejanosbestonline.com, BNET Radio, TejanoFM.com, Tejano Gold Radio, & More!

== Discography ==
- Donde Andaras (2011)
- Simplemente Audi (2014)
