= Michigan Rattlers =

American folk-rock band

- Origin: Petoskey, Michigan
- Genres: Folk Rock, Alt Rock
- Years active: 2016–2025
- Members: Graham Young (guitar); Adam Reed (bass); Christian Wilder (piano); Tony Audia (drums)
- Website: michiganrattlers.com

The Michigan Rattlers were an American folk-rock band originating from Petoskey, Michigan. The group consists of childhood friends Graham Young (guitar), Adam Reed (bass), Christian Wilder (piano), and Tony Audia (drums). Their music blends elements of country, folk, and rock, drawing inspiration from artists such as AC/DC, Creedence Clearwater Revival, Bob Seger and Bruce Springsteen.

== Formation and early years ==
Young and Reed began playing music together during high school, performing at local venues in their hometown. After graduation, they pursued separate paths but eventually reunited in Los Angeles to form the Michigan Rattlers. Their self-titled debut EP, released in 2016, garnered critical acclaim and was featured in Rolling Stone's "Ten New Country Artists You Need to Know" that same year.

== Musical style ==
Michigan Rattlers’ music is often characterized as folk-rock or Americana, with strong influences from country and classic rock. The band initially gained notice in the alt-country scene – their 2016 debut was rooted in acoustic Americana and earned them a Rolling Stone country accolade – but the members have stated they never set out to be a traditional country band. Bassist Adam Reed noted that the group “stripped down” their early sound and landed in the country/Americana genre almost by happenstance, thanks in part to the pairing of upright bass and acoustic guitar.

== Albums ==
In 2018, the band released their first full-length album, Evergreen, following performances at notable festivals such as Bonnaroo, Firefly, and Electric Forest. The album was described as rock and roll rather than country. During the COVID-19 pandemic, they collaborated with Kalamazoo State Theater for a virtual concert. Their second album, That Kind of Life, was released in 2021.

The band's third album, Waving From A Sea, was released on August 9, 2024. Produced by Dominic John Davis, bassist for Jack White's backing band The Buzzards, the album marks a shift in musical style away from acoustic arrangements to a synth rock musical aesthetic.

== Discography ==
=== Albums ===
- Evergreen (2018)
- That Kind of Life (2021)
- Waving From A Sea (2024)

=== EPs ===
- Michigan Rattlers (2016)
- Feel For Love (2024)

=== Singles ===
- Illinois Sky
- Sweet Diane
- Time to Move On
- Wasting the Meaning
- Just Good Night
- Didn't You Know
- Evergreen
- Desert Heat
- Like a Kid
- That Kind of Life
- Pure Resistance
- Heaven
- Gridlock (Just the Sky)
- Geranium Day
- Feel For Love
