= World Fitness Federation =

International bodybuilding organization

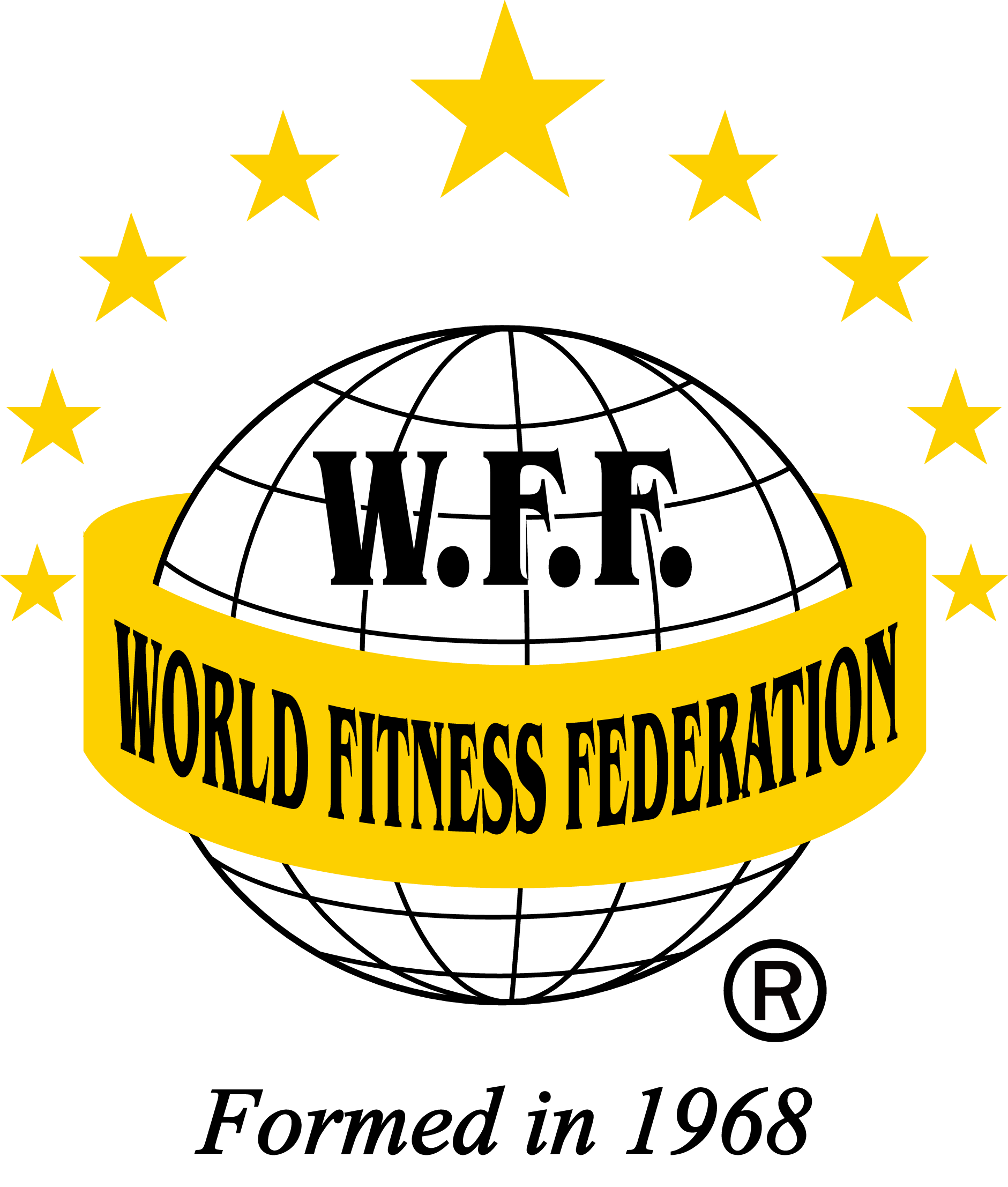
- Sport: Bodybuilding, Figure competition, Female bodybuilding
- Abbreviation: WFF
- Founded: 1968, Germany
- Headquarters: Melbourne, Australia
- President: Graeme Lancefield

Official website
- www.wff-international.com

The World Fitness Federation or WFF, is an international bodybuilding organisation formed in 1968. The WFF promotes classic or athletic bodybuilding with a focus on the aesthetic quality of the physique as opposed to just muscularity.

== History ==
The WFF was founded in 1968 in Germany by Klaus Hoffmann. The early WFF events were promoted within Eastern Europe, however throughout the 1990s international interest in WFF events drew support from far and wide and today the WFF is supported throughout every continent. Graeme Lancefield became the World President of WFF in 2013, taking over from Hoffmann upon his retirement.

In 2014 and 2015, major WFF events were staged outside of Europe for the first time with the 2014 WFF Universe being held in South Korea and the World Championships being hosted by Australia and South Africa in 2014 and 2015 respectively.

2016 saw WFF expand into the US with the WFF Universe being held in Orlando, Florida. In 2018, the WFF World Championships were held in Huntington Beach, California and were hosted by celebrity bodybuilder, Lauren Powers.

== Major events ==
The WFF currently stages two major international competitions each year. These events are Pro Qualifier competitions, where individuals are eligible to earn Professional Status within the WFF.

- The WFF Universe is usually held in June/July.
- The WFF World Championships is usually held in October/November.

Other Pro Qualifier events include the European Championships, Asia Pacific Championships, Pan-American Cup and others.

== Professional Classes ==
In 2014 the WFF Professional Division was created to provide an additional level of elite level competition. The first WFF Pro event was the 2015 WFF Universe held in La Ciotat, France.

WFF offers professional classes for men and women in bodybuilding, bikini and sports modelling. Class winners at WFF International major events and continental championships are offered pro status and the opportunity to compete for prize money.

WFF Pro qualifiers are open to all amateur competitors.

== See also ==
- National Amateur Body-Builders' Association
- International Federation of BodyBuilding & Fitness
