= Cyclomia =

Scientific classification
- Kingdom: Animalia
- Phylum: Arthropoda
- Class: Insecta
- Order: Lepidoptera
- Family: Geometridae
- Subfamily: Ennominae
- Genus: Cyclomia; Guenée, 1857

Synonyms
- Audia Walker, 1863

Genus of moths

Cyclomia is a genus of moths in the family Geometridae.

== Species ==
- Cyclomia alternata Warren, 1900
- Cyclomia amelia (Thierry-Mieg, 1915)
- Cyclomia castraria (Jones, 1921)
- Cyclomia disparilis Schaus, 1911
- Cyclomia epionaria (Guenée, [1858])
- Cyclomia faragita (Schaus, 1901)
- Cyclomia fidoniata Warren, 1901
- Cyclomia flavida Dognin, 1911
- Cyclomia fumaria (Jones, 1921)
- Cyclomia jaspidea Warren, 1897
- Cyclomia magata (Felder & Rogenhofer, 1875)
- Cyclomia minor (Felder & Rogenhofer, 1875)
- Cyclomia minuta Warren, 1900
- Cyclomia mopsaria Guenée, 1857
- Cyclomia ocana (Schaus, 1901)
- Cyclomia purpuraria (Hampson, 1904)
- Cyclomia rubida Warren, 1900
- Cyclomia sericearia (Schaus, 1901)
- Cyclomia sororcula Dognin, 1914
- Cyclomia strigifera Warren, 1906
- Cyclomia subnotata Dognin, 1914
- Cyclomia tumidilinea Warren, 1906
- Cyclomia uniseriata Dognin, 1911
- Cyclomia vinosa (Dognin, 1890)
