= Deadstar 2 =

2019 studio album by Smokepurpp

Studio album by Smokepurpp
- Released: December 13, 2019
- Recorded: 2018–2019
- Genre: Hip-hop; trap
- Length: 42:04
- Label: Alamo; Interscope
- Producer: Apex Martin; Bankroll Got It; Bans; ChaseTheMoney; D. A. Doman; Dez Wright; Diego Ave; DY; Go Grizzly; Jae Roc; JW Lucas; KBeazy; MariiBeatz; Mike Dean; Mike Hector; Murda Beatz; OJ Finessey; Pyrex; Quadwoofer; Rex Kudo; Ricky Remedy; Rico on the Keys; Ronny J; Shanks; Sool Got Hits; Stunner Samples; Thank You Fizzle; Tupun; Wallis Lane

Smokepurpp chronology
Lost Planet (2019)	Deadstar 2 (2019)	Florida Jit (2020)

Singles from Deadstar 2
- 1. "Stevie" Released: October 31, 2019; 2. "Dirty Dirty" Released: November 22, 2019; 3. "Audi II" Released: December 6, 2019; 4. "What I Please" Released: December 11, 2019

Deadstar 2 is the debut studio album by American rapper Smokepurpp. It was released on December 13, 2019, by Alamo Records and Interscope Records.

The album features guest appearances from frequent collaborator Lil Pump, as well as Denzel Curry, Ty Dolla Sign, Lil Skies, Moneybagg Yo, and Trippie Redd. Smokepurpp describes it as his "best body of work."

== Background ==
Smokepurpp released his debut commercial mixtape, Deadstar, in September 2017. He announced its sequel, Deadstar 2, in mid-2018. The initial track listing showed Lil Pump and Gunna as featured artists. The album was delayed and sometimes even scrapped multiple times due to being leaked online before its release. A track that was originally set to be on the album has also leaked, titled "No Problem", and features Kanye West. In an interview, Smokepurpp revealed he had to omit the track from the record due to Kanye West giving up on putting out secular music.

== Artwork ==
Smokepurpp revealed the album's cover art on November 3, 2019. It is inspired by a photograph of grunge icon Kurt Cobain, taken two months before his death. Similarly, the album's prequel, Deadstar, also references a rock artist on its cover artwork, GG Allin, particularly an image of his open casket.

== Track listing ==
No.	Title	Writer(s)	Producer(s)	Length
1.	"The Matrix"	Omar Pineiro; Michael Dean; Nima Jahanbin; Paimon Jahanbin	Mike Dean; Wallis Lane	2:02
2.	"Red Bottoms"	Pineiro; Dean; Asten Harris; Shankar Ravindran	Apex Martin; Dean; Shanks; Smokepurpp	2:41
3.	"Stevie"	Pineiro; Diego Avendano; Kevin Price; Rasool Diaz	Diego Ave; Go Grizzly; Sool Got Hits	2:01
4.	"What I Please" (featuring Denzel Curry)	Pineiro; Keegan Bach; Mike Hector; Gavin Valencia; Blair Reese; Denzel Curry	KBeazy; Hector; OJ Finessey; Quadwoofer	2:20
5.	"Ariba"	Pineiro; Price; Jamarii Massey	Go Grizzly; MariiBeatz	2:12
6.	"All for Me" (featuring Trippie Redd)	Pineiro; Michael Mora; Leonardo Mateu; Michael White IV	Bans; Stunner Samples	1:56
7.	"Past the Moon Interlude"	Pineiro; Dean; Richard Duran	Mike Dean; Ricky Remedy	2:21
8.	"Lightspeed"	Pineiro; Harris; Dean	Apex Martin; Mike Dean	2:29
9.	"Fill the Room Up" (featuring Ty Dolla Sign)	Pineiro; Price; Shane Lindstrom; Tyrone Griffin, Jr.	Murda Beatz; Go Grizzly	2:23
10.	"Reckless"	Pineiro; Adrienne Byrne; Justin Thomas; David Doman	D. A. Doman	1:46
11.	"Dirty Dirty" (featuring Lil Skies)	Pineiro; Avendano; Harris; Dylan Cleary-Krell; Kimetrius Foose	Diego Ave; Apex Martin; Dez Wright	2:24
12.	"Floor Seats – Yet"	Pineiro; Chase Rose; Kedrick Cannady; John Lucas	ChaseTheMoney; Pyrex; JW Lucas	4:21
13.	"Left Right" (featuring Lil Pump)	Pineiro; Joshua Goldenburg; Gazzy Garcia	Fizzle	2:13
14.	"On Purppose"	Pineiro; Sean Mula; Joel Banks; Taylor Banks; Germán Valdés	Bankroll Got It; Jae Roc	2:19
15.	"Robbin Robbin"	Pineiro; Masamune Kudo; Dwan Avery	DY; Rex Kudo	3:02
16.	"Pop 1" (featuring Moneybagg Yo)	Pineiro; Lindstrom; Demario White, Jr.	Murda Beatz	2:40
17.	"Audi II"	Pineiro; Edwin Morina; Eric Mullegger; Ronald Spence, Jr.	Ronny J; Tupun; Rico on the Keys	2:46
Total length:				42:04

Notes

- The track "All for Me" originally came from Trippie Redd's mixtape A Love Letter to You 4 and is an edited version of the same track, missing the original XXXTentacion voice recording.

== Charts ==
Chart (2019)	Peak position
Canadian Albums (Billboard)	86
US Billboard 200	137
