= Todd Smith =

Todd Smith may refer to:

== People ==
- Todd Smith (musician), American singer, songwriter and guitarist
- Todd Smith (American politician), American politician
- Todd Smith (Canadian politician), Canadian politician
- Todd Smith, American vocalist and member of Selah
- Todd Smith (wrestler), American wrestler
- Todd Joseph Smith, American bodybuilder
- Todd Smith, brother of musician Patti Smith
- James Todd Smith, birth name of American rapper LL Cool J
- Todd Smith (journalist), American journalist murdered in Peru

== Music ==
- Todd Smith (album), 2006 studio album of LL Cool J
- Todd Smith Pt.2: Back to Cool, alternative working name for Exit 13, 2008 studio album of LL Cool J
