= List of Livingston Award winners =

The following is a list of Livingston Award winners. The award is given for works published in the previous year.

Year	Recipient(s)	Recipient Age	Story	Award
2025	Jessika Harkay	24	"Aleysha Ortiz" for The Connecticut Mirror	Excellence in Local Reporting
2025	Esmy Jimenez	30	"Lost Patients" for The Seattle Times in partnership with KUOW Public Radio	Excellence in National Reporting
2025	Sydney Brownstone	34	"Lost Patients" for The Seattle Times in partnership with KUOW Public Radio	Excellence in National Reporting
2025	Nicole Sadek	26	"The Lost Village" for the International Consortium of Investigative Journalists	Excellence in International Reporting
2024	Samantha Hogan	30	"Maine's Part-Time Court" for The Maine Monitor	Excellence in Local Reporting
2024	Alison Behringer	33	"Bodies" for KCRW	Excellence in National Reporting
2024	Lila Hassan	28	"Bodies" for KCRW	Excellence in National Reporting
2024	Renata Brito	31	"Adrift/36 Days" for the Associated Press	Excellence in International Reporting
2023	Caitlin Dickerson	33	"We Need to Take Away Children: The Secret History of the U.S. Government's Family-Separation Policy" for The Atlantic	Excellence in National Reporting
2023	Vasilisa Stepanenko	22	"A Year of War: Adversity Taps Into Deep Skills of Young Ukrainian Journalist" for the Associated Press	Excellence in International Reporting
2023	Anna Wolfe	28	"The Backchannel: Mississippi’s Welfare Scandal" for Mississippi Today	Excellence in Local Reporting
2022	Erika Lantz		"The Turning: The Sisters Who Left" for Rococo Punch	Excellence in International Reporting
2022	Elin Lantz Lesser		"The Turning: The Sisters Who Left" for Rococo Punch	Excellence in International Reporting
2022	Jose A. Del Real		"Truth, Trust, and Conspiracy Theories in America" for The Washington Post	Excellence in National Reporting
2022	Alex Stuckey		"In Crisis" for Houston Chronicle	Excellence in Local Reporting
2021	Chao Deng		"On the Front Lines in Wuhan" for The Wall Street Journal	Excellence in International Reporting
2021	Hannah Dreier		"Trust and Consequences" for The Washington Post	Excellence in National Reporting
2021	Joshua Sharpe		"The Imperfect Alibi: The forgotten suspect, the DNA and the church murders that haunted a detective" for The Atlanta Journal-Constitution	Excellence in Local Reporting
2020	Assia Boundaoui		"The Feeling of Being Watched" for PBS's POV	Excellence in National Reporting
2020	Caroline Chen		"Heartless Hospital" for ProPublica	Excellence in Local Reporting
2020	Brett Murphy		"Show of Force" for USA Today	Excellence in International Reporting
2019	Lindsey Smith	34	"Believed" for Michigan Radio	Excellence in Local Reporting
2019	Kate Wells	31	"Believed" for Michigan Radio	Excellence in Local Reporting
2019	Chris Outcalt	34	"Murder at the Alcatraz of the Rockies" for The Atavist Magazine	Excellence in National Reporting
2019	Davey Alba	31	"How Duterte Used Facebook to Fuel the Philippine Drug War" for BuzzFeed News	Excellence in International Reporting
2018	Riham Feshir		"74 Seconds," for Minnesota Public Radio News	Excellence in Local Reporting
2018	Meg Martin		"74 Seconds," for Minnesota Public Radio News	Excellence in Local Reporting
2018	Tracy Mumford		"74 Seconds," for Minnesota Public Radio News	Excellence in Local Reporting
2018	Ronan Farrow	31	"Ronan Farrow’s Investigation of Harvey Weinstein" for The New Yorker	Excellence in National Reporting
2018	Emily Steel		"O’Reilly Thrives, Then Falls, as Settlements Add Up" for The New York Times	Excellence in National Reporting
2018	Michael S. Schmidt	35	"O’Reilly Thrives, Then Falls, as Settlements Add Up" for The New York Times	Excellence in National Reporting
2018	Christina Goldbaum		"Strong Evidence that U.S. Special Operations Forces Massacred Civilians in Somalia" for The Daily Beast	Excellence in International Reporting
2017	Claire Galofaro	34	"Surviving Appalachia" for Associated Press	Excellence in Local Reporting
2017	Brooke Jarvis	32	"Unclaimed" for The California Sunday Magazine	Excellence in National Reporting
2017	Ben Taub	25	"The Assad Files" for The New Yorker	Excellence in International Reporting
2016	Lisa Gartner	28	"Failure Factories" for Tampa Bay Times	Excellence in Local Reporting
2016	Michael LaForgia	32	"Failure Factories" for Tampa Bay Times	Excellence in Local Reporting
2016	Nathaniel Lash	24	"Failure Factories" for Tampa Bay Times	Excellence in Local Reporting
2016	Mike Baker	31	"The Mobile-Home Trap" for The Seattle Times, The Center for Public Integrity and BuzzFeed News	Excellence in National Reporting
2016	Daniel Wagner	34	"The Mobile-Home Trap" for The Seattle Times, The Center for Public Integrity and BuzzFeed News	Excellence in National Reporting
2016	Adrian Chen	31	"The Agency" for The New York Times Magazine	Excellence in International Reporting
2015	Kiera Feldman	29	"Sexual Assault at God’s Harvard" for The New Republic	Excellence in Local Reporting
2015	Shoshana Walter	29	"Hired Guns" for The Center for Investigative Reporting	Excellence in National Reporting
2015	Ryan Gabrielson	34	"Hired Guns" for The Center for Investigative Reporting	Excellence in National Reporting
2015	Matthieu Aikins	30	"Whoever Saves a Life" for Matter/Medium	Excellence in International Reporting
2014	Christopher Baxter	28	"Private Schools, Hidden Riches" for The Star-Ledger	Excellence in Local Reporting
2014	Ellen Gabler	33	"Deadly Delays" for Milwaukee Journal Sentinel	Excellence in National Reporting
2014	Allan James Vestal	24	"Deadly Delays" for Milwaukee Journal Sentinel	Excellence in National Reporting
2014	Luke Mogelson	29	"The Dream Boat" for The New York Times Magazine	Excellence in International Reporting
2013	Alexandra Zayas	29	"In God’s Name" for Tampa Bay Times	Excellence in Local Reporting
2013	Rachel Manteuffel	28	"The Things They Leave Behind" for Washingtonian Magazine	Excellence in National Reporting
2013	John D. Sutter	29	"Slavery’s Last Stronghold" for CNN Digital	Excellence in International Reporting
2013	Edythe McNamee	27	"Slavery’s Last Stronghold" for CNN Digital	Excellence in International Reporting
2012	Andrew McLemore	25	"Until Proven Innocent" for The Williamson County Sun	Excellence in Local Reporting
2012	Olga Pierce	32	"Redistricting: How Powerful Hands Are Drawing You Out of A Vote" for ProPublica	Excellence in National Reporting
2012	Jeff Larson	30	"Redistricting: How Powerful Hands Are Drawing You Out of A Vote" for ProPublica	Excellence in National Reporting
2012	Lois Beckett	25	"Redistricting: How Powerful Hands Are Drawing You Out of A Vote" for ProPublica	Excellence in National Reporting
2012	Mattathias Schwartz	32	"A Massacre in Jamaica" for The New Yorker	Excellence in International Reporting
2011	Sarah Fenske		"Mr. Big Stuff" for Phoenix New Times	Excellence in Local Reporting
2011	John Henion		"Rape on the Reservation" for Current TV	Excellence in National Reporting
2011	Mariana van Zeller	35	"Rape on the Reservation" for Current TV	Excellence in National Reporting
2011	Matt Katz	33	"Mired in Afghanistan" for The Philadelphia Inquirer	Excellence in International Reporting
2010	Mark Greenblatt		"Under Fire: Discrimination and Corruption in the Texas National Guard" for KHOU-TV	Excellence in Local Reporting
2010	David Nathaniel Philipps	33	"Casualties of War" for The Gazette (Colorado Springs)	Excellence in National Reporting
2010	Abbie Boudreau	32	"The Killings at the Canal: The Army Tapes" for CNN	Excellence in International Reporting
2009	John Dickerson	27	"The Doctor is Out" for Phoenix New Times	Excellence in Local Reporting
2009	Kate Kelly	34	"Lost Opportunities Haunt Final Days of Bear Stearns" for The Wall Street Journal	Excellence in National Reporting
2009	Lydia Polgreen	34	"The Spoils" for The New York Times	Excellence in International Reporting
2008	Dave Jamieson		"Letters From an Arsonist" for Washington City Paper	Excellence in Local Reporting
2008	Craig Kapitan		"The Long Road Home" for The Bryan-College Station Eagle	Excellence in National Reporting
2008	Mark Mazzetti	34	"C.I.A. Destroyed Two Tapes Showing Interrogations" for The New York Times	Excellence in National Reporting
2008	Christof Putzel		"From Russia With Hate" for Current TV	Excellence in International Reporting
2007	Joshua Boak	28	"Business as Usual" for The Blade (Toledo, Ohio)	Excellence in Local Reporting
2007	Jim Tankersley	29	"Business as Usual" for The Blade (Toledo, Ohio)	Excellence in Local Reporting
2007	Stella Chavez	34	"Yolanda's Crossing" for The Dallas Morning News	Excellence in National Reporting
2007	Paul David Meyer	29	"Yolanda's Crossing" for The Dallas Morning News	Excellence in National Reporting
2007	Evan Osnos	31	"The Price We Pay for China's Boom" for The Chicago Tribune	Excellence in International Reporting
2006	Peter Zuckerman	27	"Scouts Honor" for Post Register	Excellence in Local Reporting
2006	Robin Mejia	32	"Reasonable Doubt: Can Crime Labs Be Trusted?" for CNN	Excellence in National Reporting
2006	Edward Wong	34	"The Struggle for Iraq" for The New York Times	Excellence in International Reporting
2005	Pauline Arrillaga	34	"Doors to Death" for Associated Press	Excellence in Local Reporting
2005	Reese Dunklin	31	"Runaway Priests: Hiding in Plain Sight" for The Dallas Morning News	Excellence in National Reporting
2005	Sharmeen Obaid-Chinoy	27	"Reinventing the Taliban" for Discovery Times Channel	Excellence in International Reporting
2004	Cathy Frye	34	"Caught in the Web" for Arkansas Democrat-Gazette	Excellence in Local Reporting
2004	Nicholas Confessore	28	"G.I. Woe" for Washington Monthly	Excellence in National Reporting
2004	Julie Jargon	29	"The War Within" (series), "Honor Rolled", "Take These Wings" for Westword	Excellence in National Reporting
2004	T. Christian Miller	34	"Colombia's Children of War" (series), "A Family Undone by War", "A Piece of Boyhood is Stolen" for Los Angeles Times	Excellence in International Reporting
2003	Michael Luo	26	"Small Town Justice" for Associated Press	Excellence in Local Reporting
2003	Alix Spiegel	31	"81 Words: The Story of a Definition" for This American Life, WBEZ, Chicago Public Radio	Excellence in National Reporting
2003	Philip P. Pan	31	"High Tide of Labor Unrest in China" for The Washington Post	Excellence in International Reporting
2002	Patrick Healy	30	"Harvard's Quiet Secret" (series) for The Boston Globe	Excellence in Local Reporting
2002	Bob Norman	33	"Admitting Terror" for New Times Broward-Palm Beach	Excellence in National Reporting
2002	Sumana Chatterjee	30	"A Taste of Slavery" for Knight-Ridder News Service	Excellence in International Reporting
2002	Sudarsan Raghavan	34	"A Taste of Slavery" for Knight-Ridder News Service	Excellence in International Reporting
2001	Jennifer Gonnerman	29	"Riker's Island and Life on the Outside" for The Village Voice	Excellence in Local Reporting
2001	Edward Pinder	30	"Master Teacher"	Excellence in National Reporting
2001	Michael Finkel	32	"Desperate Passage" for The New York Times Magazine	Excellence in International Reporting
2000	Sean Patrick Lyons	28	"A System Padded with Patronage" for Waterbury Republican-American	Excellence in Local Reporting
2000	Ken Ward Jr.	32	"Mountaintop Removal" for The Charleston Gazette	Excellence in National Reporting
2000	Kevin Heldman	34	"Japanese Prisons: Brutality by Design" for APBnews.com	Excellence in International Reporting
1999	Jo Becker	31	"Trouble in Pasco County" for St. Petersburg Times	Excellence in Local Reporting
1999	Laura Meckler	30	"Organ Transplantation" (series) for Associated Press	Excellence in National Reporting
1999	Elizabeth Rubin	33	"Our Children Are Killing Us" for The New Yorker	Excellence in International Reporting
1998	J. R. Moehringer	33	"The Champ" for Los Angeles Times	Excellence in Local Reporting
1998	Lindsey Schwartz	26	"Probable Cause" for Dateline, NBC News	Excellence in National Reporting
1998	Patrick Weiland	34	"Probable Cause" for Dateline, NBC News	Excellence in National Reporting
1998	Alan Zarembo	26	"Judgment Day" for Harper's Magazine	Excellence in International Reporting
1997	Scott Glover	30	"Quick Cash: With Few Questions" for Sun-Sentinel	Excellence in Local Reporting
1997	Evelyn Larrubia	27	"Quick Cash: With Few Questions" for Sun-Sentinel	Excellence in Local Reporting
1997	Charles Sennott	34	"Armed for Profit" for The Boston Globe	Excellence in National Reporting
1997	C. J. Chivers	33	"Empty Nets: Atlantic Banks in Peril" (series) for The Providence Journal-Bulletin	Excellence in International Reporting
1996	Chris Adams	30	"Medicaid Madness" for The Times-Picayune	Excellence in Local Reporting
1996	Jim Lynch	34	"Angry Patriots" (series) for The Spokesman-Review	Excellence in National Reporting
1996	David S. Rohde	28	Bosnia Massacre Coverage for The Christian Science Monitor	Excellence in International Reporting
1995	Melinda Ruley	33	"Downeast" (series) for The Independent (Durham N.C.)	Excellence in Local Reporting
1995	Jeanmarie Condon	32	"Turning Point at Waco: The Untold Story" for ABC News	Excellence in National Reporting
1995	Mitchell Zuckoff	32	"Foul Trade" (series) for The Boston Globe	Excellence in International Reporting
1994	Mark Flatten	34	"Policing for Profits" (series) for Tribune Newspapers (Ariz.)	Excellence in Local Reporting
1994	Darcy Frey	32	"The Last Shot" for Harper's Magazine	Excellence in National Reporting
1994	Pamela Burdman	31	"Bitter Voyage" for San Francisco Chronicle	Excellence in International Reporting
1993	Celia W. Dugger	34	"When Abuse Turns Fatal" for The New York Times	Excellence in Local Reporting
1993	Bert Robinson	31	"Showdown in the West: The Endangered Species Act" for the San Jose Mercury News	Excellence in National Reporting
1993	Scott Thurm	34	"Showdown in the West: The Endangered Species Act" for the San Jose Mercury News	Excellence in National Reporting
1993	Christiane Amanpour	34	"Siege of Sarajevo" for CNN	Excellence in International Reporting
1992	Thomas French	34	"South of Heaven" for the St. Petersburg Times	Excellence in Local Reporting
1992	Leda Zimmerman		"Hard Lessons at Chelsea High" for WGBH-TV	Excellence in National Reporting
1992	Steve Coll	34	"Crisis and Change in South Asia" for The Washington Post	Excellence in International Reporting
1992	Eason Jordan	31	Coverage of the Gulf War, the Soviet crisis, and the African famine	Special Citation for Outstanding Enterprise
1991	David Isay	25	"Tossing Away the Keys" for NPR	Excellence in Local Reporting
1991	Jack Hitt	33	"Terminal Delinquents" for Esquire	Excellence in National Reporting
1991	Paul Tough	23	"Terminal Delinquents" for Esquire	Excellence in National Reporting
1991	David Remnick	32	"Millions of Soviet Lives Pervaded by Poverty" for The Washington Post	Excellence in International Reporting
1990	Michele Norris	29	"Six-Year-Old's Maryland Home was a Modern-Day Opium Den" for The Washington Post	Excellence in Local Reporting
1990	Tom Ashbrook	34	"A View From the East" for The Boston Globe	Excellence in National Reporting
1990	Peter Gumbel	31	"Gorbachev's Broken Economy" for The Wall Street Journal	Excellence in International Reporting
1990	Todd Smith	28	Reporter, The Tampa Tribune	Special Posthumous Citation
1989	Bonita Brodt	32	"Chicago Schools: Worst in America" for the Chicago Tribune	Excellence in Local Reporting
1989	David Von Drehle	28	"The Death Penalty: A Failure of Execution" for the Miami Herald	Excellence in National Reporting
1989	Anne Nelson	35	"In the Grotto of the Pink Sisters" for Mother Jones	Excellence in International Reporting
1988	Kevin Cullen	29	"Bad Boys" for The Boston Globe	Excellence in Local Reporting
1988	Deborah Blum	34	"California: The Weapons Master" for The Sacramento Bee	Excellence in National Reporting
1988	Ira Glass	28	"Radio in Vietnam" for NPR	Excellence in International Reporting
1988	Alexis Muellner	25	"Radio in Vietnam" for NPR	Excellence in International Reporting
1988	Jonathan Schwartz	31	"Radio in Vietnam" for NPR	Excellence in International Reporting
1987	Benjamin L. Weiser	32	"No Exit: Juvenile Justice in Washington" for The Washington Post	Excellence in Local Reporting
1987	Max Zieman	25	"Dirty Grain" for The Kansas City Star	Excellence in National Reporting
1987	Barbara Fischkin	32	"A Chronicle of Hope" for Newsday	Excellence in International Reporting
1986	Charles Ely	34	"Tulsa's Golden Missionary" for KTUL	Excellence in Local Reporting
1986	Jim Lyons		"Tulsa's Golden Missionary" for KTUL	Excellence in Local Reporting
1986	Gregg Easterbrook	32	"Making Sense of Agriculture" for The Atlantic	Excellence in National Reporting
1986	Blaine Harden	33	"Notes of a Famine Watcher" for The Washington Post	Excellence in International Reporting
1985	Tom Hallman	29	"Valsetz 1919–84" for The Oregonian	Excellence in Local Reporting
1985	Susan Milstein	27	"Lazy Justice" for The American Lawyer	Excellence in National Reporting
1985	Larry Tye	30	"America's Shame" for The Courier-Journal	Excellence in International Reporting
1984	Daniel Biddle	30	"Above the Law" for The Philadelphia Inquirer	Excellence in Local Reporting
1984	Barry Siegel	34	"El Nino: The World Turns Topsy-Turvy" for the Los Angeles Times	Excellence in National Reporting
1984	Rick Atkinson	31	"The Hunger Games: Our Wasted Foreign Aid" for the Kansas City Times	Excellence in International Reporting
1983	Mark Feldstein	26	"Prisoners of the Harvest" for WTSP-TV	Excellence in Local Reporting
1983	Jim Sutherland	26	"Prisoners of the Harvest" for WTSP-TV	Excellence in Local Reporting
1983	Edward Zuckerman	34	"How Would the U.S. Survive a Nuclear War?" for Esquire	Excellence in National Reporting
1983	Thomas Friedman	30	"The Beirut Massacre: The Four Days" for The New York Times	Excellence in International Reporting
1982	Eric Scigliano	28	"The Aleuts' Last Stand" for the Seattle Weekly	Excellence in Local Reporting
1982	H. G. (Buzz) Bissinger	28	"The Plane That Fell From the Sky" for the St. Paul Pioneer Press	Excellence in National Reporting
1982	Steven Erlanger	30	"Envy of the West Vies with Pride in Nation" for The Boston Globe	Excellence in International Reporting

== See also ==
- Richard M. Clurman Award — mentoring award presented during the Livingston Award ceremonies
