= Plantation, Florida =

City in the United States

- City
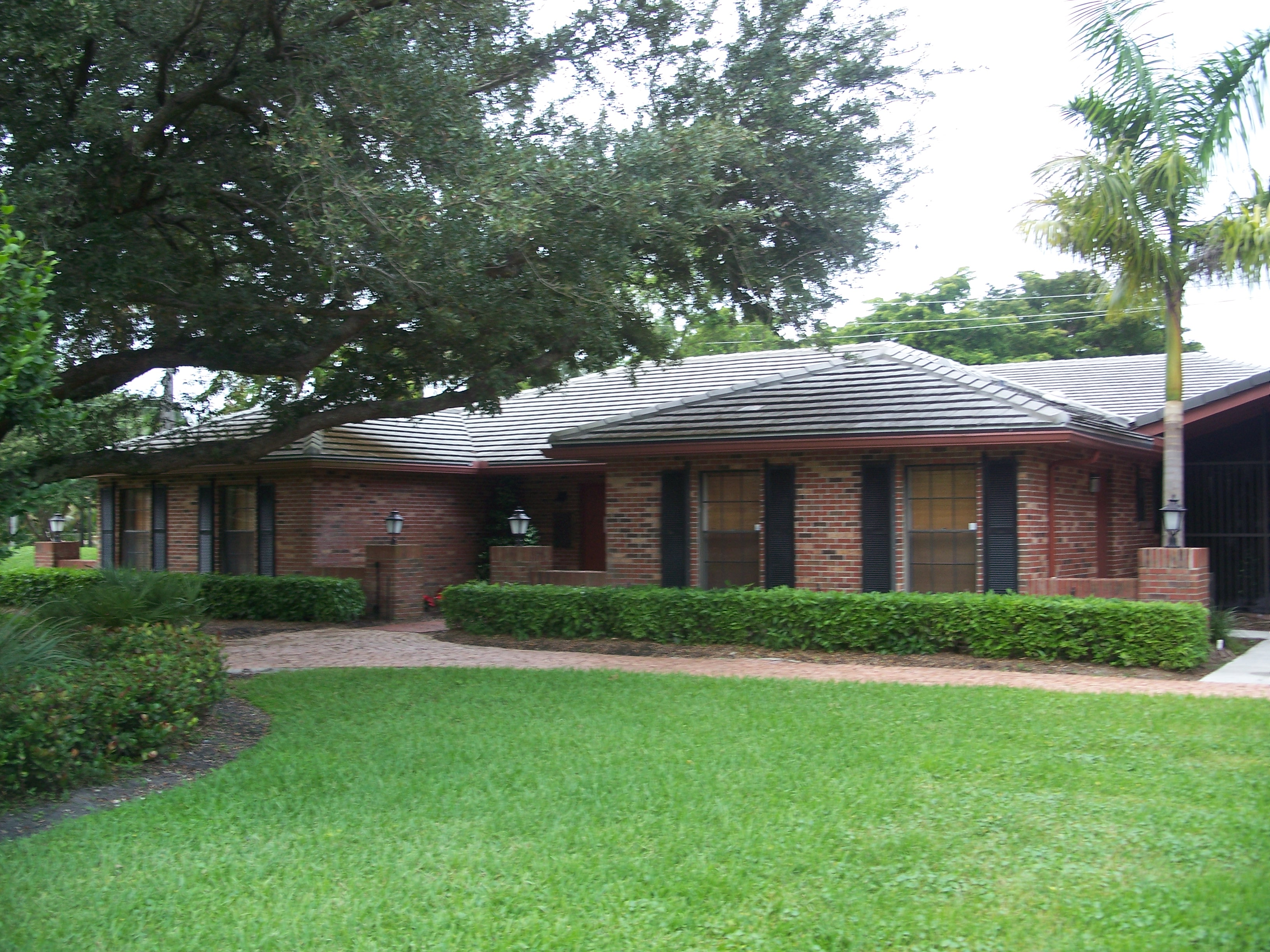
- Plantation Historical Museum

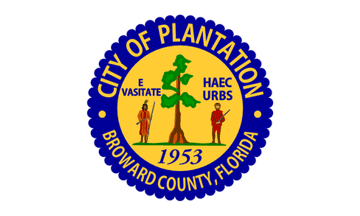
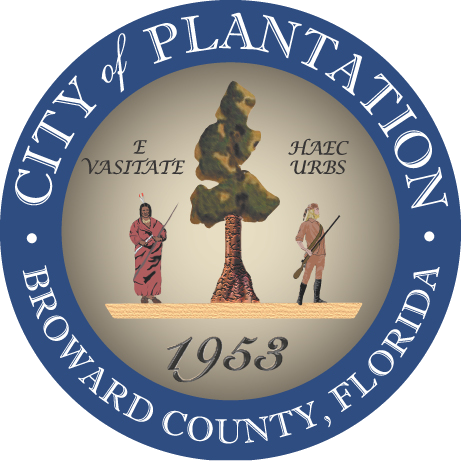
- Flag Seal
- Mottoes: "The Grass is Greener" and "E Vasitate Haec Urbs"
- Coordinates: 26°7′28″N 80°14′58″W
- Country: United States
- State: Florida
- County: Broward
- Incorporated: April 23, 1953

Government
  - Type: Mayor-Council
  - Mayor: Nick Sortal
  - Council President: Jennifer Andreu
  - Councilmembers: Erik Anderson, Denise Appleby Horland, Louis Reinstein, and Pro Tem President Timothy J. Fadgen
  - Chief Administrative Officer: Jason Nunemaker
  - City Clerk: April Beggerow

Area
  - City: 22.05 sq mi (57.12 km^{2})
  - Land: 21.75 sq mi (56.33 km^{2})
  - Water: 0.30 sq mi (0.78 km^{2}) 0.87%
- Elevation: 9.0 ft (2.75 m)

Population (2020)
  - City: 91,750
  - Estimate (2025): 99,183
  - Density: 4,218.2/sq mi (1,628.66/km^{2})
  - Metro: 6,166,488
- Time zone: UTC-5 (EST)
  - Summer (DST): UTC-4 (EDT)
- ZIP Codes: 33311, 33313, 33317, 33322-33325, 33388
- Area codes: 754, 954
- FIPS code: 12-57425
- GNIS feature ID: 2404536
- Website: www.plantation.org

Plantation is a city in Broward County, Florida, United States. It is a part of the Miami metropolitan area. The city's name comes from the previous part-owner of the land, the Everglades Plantation Company, and their unsuccessful attempts to establish a rice plantation in the area. As of the 2020 US census, the population was 91,750.

== History ==
=== Land acquisition and drainage (1855–1930) ===
Before the start of the 20th century, the area that became Plantation was part of the Everglades wetlands, regularly covered by 2–3 feet of water. In 1855, Florida state passed the Internal Improvement Act and established the Internal Improvement Trust Fund, the trustees of which act as a government agency to oversee the management, sale, and development of state land. In 1897, the Interior Department submitted 2.9 million acres to the Florida Land Office; however, the submission was revoked the following year, due to fears it would "impinge upon the rights and interests of the Seminole Tribes." The Seminole people regularly used the area for hunting, fishing, and camping, and also used the nearby Pine Island Ridge as a headquarters during the second and third Seminole Wars.

In 1899, Florida Governor William Sherman Jennings began an initiative to drain the Everglades. To establish Florida's entitlement to the land, Jennings obtained a new patent (known as the 'Everglades Patent') for land "aggregating 2,862,280 acres." Following his election in 1905, Jennings' successor, Napoleon Bonaparte Broward appointed Jennings as general counsel of the Internal Improvement Fund and continued the initiative for complete drainage of the Everglades (which was a core theme of his election campaign). Broward described the drainage as a duty of the trustees, and promised to create an "Empire of the Everglades".

The first attempts to drain the Everglades began in 1906, with the building and launching of two dredges into the New River: The Okeechobee (commanded by Captain Walter S. Holloway of the US Army Corps of Engineers) began cutting from the river's south fork (establishing the South New River Canal), and The Everglades began cutting from the north fork up to Lake Okeechobee (establishing the North New River Canal). The first waterway opened after the drainage attempts were named The Holloway Canal, after Captain Holloway.

Following a meeting at the 1908 Democratic National Convention, Broward and Jennings established a deal with Richard 'Dicky' J. Bolles: The fund trustees granted Bolles 500,000 acres (2,000 km^{2}) of overflowed state lands at $2 per acre, with an agreement for the State to use 50% of the $1 million proceeds purely for drainage and reclamation, and another agreement to establish 5 main canals. Following this, Bolles founded the Florida Fruit Lands Company, becoming the Everglades' first private developer.

The Everglades Plantation Company was established in January 1909, following entry into a 2-year contract with the Internal Improvement Fund trustees by Adam A. Boggs (attorney and vice president of the Miami Bank and Trust Company) and A.B. Sanders (engineer and later president of the Miami Engineering and Construction Company) to create a rice plantation in the Everglades. The agreement enabled Boggs & Sanders to rent a significant amount of land around the (then work-in-progress) North New River Canal, and also subsequently purchase the land for between $3 and $15 per acre.

It was later discovered that the area leased to Boggs & Sanders already belonged to Dicky Bolles, as part of the 500,000 acres he had purchased; however, the Everglades Plantation Company was able to retain the land, despite Bolles' claims. Sanders led further reclamation efforts for the area, including the digging of 60 miles of ditches. Boggs & Sanders were also granted extensions to their 2-year contract, on the grounds that the land remained underwater.

In 1911, Bolles held a land lottery (known as the Progresso Land Auction) at $20–24 per acre, granting residential lots in the Town of Progresso (now the area known as Wilton Manors) to anyone purchasing farmland of five acres or more in the drainage land; however, no auction actually took place and the purchased land remained under water. As a result, a lawsuit was brought against Bolles.

In 1912, the North New River Canal opened, and the Sewell Lock (also known as Lock No.1), the first lock in Florida, and one of the older remaining structures in Broward County, was built on it, just outside of what is now Plantation. The lock enabled access between the Everglades and Lake Okeechobee by water.

The lawsuit against Bolles was settled in November 1913, with Bolles retaining the $1.4 million already received, but prohibiting any further collection until the land was drained and surveyed. Bolles was also arrested in December of that year but was subsequently found innocent.

Drainage of the land largely failed, with most of it reverting to the state for taxes; however, two local farmers, O. L Daniel and Dewey Hawkins began buying it, acquiring approximately 6,000 acres and 4,000 acres respectively.

In the years following their original agreement, contract negotiation escalated into legal battles between the Everglades Plantation Company and the Internal Improvement Trustees. These disputes ended in 1914, in the company's favor. The Trustees no longer insisted on the continuation of the rice plantation attempts and, from this point, the company focused primarily on land sales.

Broward County (originally planned under the name Everglades County but ultimately named after former governor Broward) was created by the Florida legislature in 1915 by combining portions of Dade County and Palm Beach County.

Driven by the success of the drainage projects, the Florida Land Boom took place between 1920 and 1925, seeing rapid growth in population and land sales. The boom reached its peak in the fall of 1925 and subsequently collapsed in 1926.

The land boom was closely followed by two severe hurricanes striking the area, significantly impacting the established communities and killing thousands. The first, in September 1926 (known as the 1926 Miami hurricane), reached wind speeds of 140 miles per hour, and the second, in September 1928 (known as the 1928 Okeechobee hurricane), reached wind speeds of 135 miles per hour. In response, additional flood control laws were established, and millions of additional dollars were spent on drainage efforts across the Everglades in the subsequent decades.

=== Initial development (1931–1952) ===
Future Plantation founder, Frederick C. Peters, the millionaire heir to a shoe business, moved to Goulds, Florida in 1931 (following doctor's advice to seek a warmer climate for his son), beginning both potato and cattle businesses; however, in 1939, Peters received advice from Stephan Zacher (a ranch-owner) to find better land for his cattle in Davie, Florida. With most large tracts of land in Davie already established as groves, Peters (following extensive testing by the United States Soil Conservation Service) purchased 10,000 acres (40 km^{2}) further north for approximately $10–25 per acre, financed with a $350,000 mortgage. The land was previously owned by Dewey Hawkins (who held the majority) and by Boggs' and Sanders' Everglades Plantation Company.

With the aim to create a farming-cooperative-based, rural alternative to suburban Dade Country, Peters built the city's first ranch buildings, which were designed by Stephan Zacher. In 1942, he had Leslie E. Bitting (son of Ben Bitting, who worked at Peters' previous Dade County farm) begin moving Peters' cattle to the area, and look after the building.

Between 1944 and 1945, Peters shifted from the idea of building a farming cooperative, hiring architect Russell Pancoast to assist with the creation of the city master plan, and C. Kay Davis to establish a water control system. In 1946, a special-purpose local government, named the Old Plantation Water Control District, was also chartered by the state (led by civil engineer John Brendla) to commence drainage of the area previously intended for plantation development, and oversee its secondary canals.

Chauncey Clark Jr. (originally from Michigan, but living in Miami Beach) was told by Peters that, in exchange for an effective development plan, Peters would provide land options and complete drainage & access as needed. Clark Jr.'s plan for 40 acre ranches, clubs, golf courses and an airfield failed to attract investment, but his father, Chauncey Clark Sr., established an alternative plan for single-acre lots with 2-bedroom houses and a 20-tree orchard in each. Miami's Robert Law Weed designed the first homes, which were then built in 1947, on East Acre Drive under the name Plantation Homes Inc. The development's name (which went on to become the name of the entire city) came from that by which the area had become known, including its Water Control District subdivision, 'Plantation'.

Clark's advertising referred to Plantation as "the Dream City" with "Rich Living at Small Cost" and Peters' advertising described "A Full Acre with Every Home." A two-bedroom home with an acre of land and 20 fruit trees was sold for $10,241, and the property was valued at $200 per acre; however, early into construction, many of the homes were destroyed by flooding, caused by 93 consecutive days of rain and two hurricanes. Despite the setbacks, 15 houses were under construction at the time the hurricanes passed. Clark repaired and restored all of the homes damaged at his own personal expense. During this same year, road-builder Finley Smith began plans to expand Broward Boulevard from State Road 7 to the Holloway Canal.

In 1948, Chauncey Clark Jr.'s home was the first completed, and Clark moved into the house with his family. Construction operations expanded, alongside a dedicated sales group, with approximately three houses being completed and sold per week. A total of approximately 120 homes were built that year, and the city's population grew to 30 families in size. That year, Ann Carter (wife of Claude E, Carter) also gave birth to Eugene Carter, the first child born in the city. 1948 also saw the completion of new dikes and a pumping station on the East Holloway Canal, and formation of The Plantation Community Church (which held its first services in the construction trailer office of Frederick Peters).

In September and October 1948, two hurricanes impacted the area, causing flooding and the breakage of a work-in-progress dike during the second hurricane. Rapid repairs and extensions to the dikes, new cofferdams, and pumping were used to end the flooding; however, house sales halted in 1949 due to the repeated flooding. Although work continued on new roads, dikes, and houses, Clark's Plantation Homes Inc. was dissolved, and the assets went to Frederick C. Peters.

1949 also saw the opening of Plantation Pumping Station No. 2 (allowing the pumping of 126 million gallons per day into the North New River Canal), the founding of the Plantation Women's Club (by Mrs. Helen Hoffman), and the founding of the Plantation Homeowners' organization (by Dr. Abram Hoffman). At this time, there were 40 occupied homes in the area.

1950 then saw the completion of the Plantation Golf Course and Country Club, built with the intent to encourage the westward extension of Broward Boulevard.

=== City incorporation (1953–1963) ===
The city of Plantation was incorporated as a city on April 23, 1953 (with a population of 300 and a budget of less than $2,000 at the time). The Plantation Homeowners Association appointed Ellsworth D. Gage (then president of the Homeowners' Association) as the city's first Mayor, with Paul Stoner, Winslow Freeman, George Bartold, Walter Bartels, and Wilfred J. Perry Lohman elected to the City Council; however, none of these early city officials took any salary from the position. A building originally intended as a community center, but being used as a warehouse, was used for the first city council meeting, city hall, fire station, and police station. This building, originally known as the Hoffman Building, is now the kitchen area of Deicke Auditorium.

On August 1, 1954, the Miami Herald publicly unveiled the city plan, calling Plantation "The City of the Future".

In 1955, S. Robinson Estey was elected as the city's second mayor (and the first elected to the position). Plantation Police Dept. was organized in the same year, with the first police car and officer (Henry C. 'Hank' Donath), who ran the department alone for several years, on call 24 hours per day. At that time, the city population remained less than 800 people.

The city's fire department's barbecue fundraiser began in 1956 and remains one of the city's annual traditions. Plantation's Volunteer Fire Dept. was subsequently formed in 1957, with Richard Stephenson appointed as the first Fire Chief. The city's first industrial plant (Airpax Products, Co.) opened on Sunrise Blvd in 1957 (in what is now Plantation Technology Park), as did Plantation Community Church's first sanctuary (now known as Missions Prayer Chapel) and the Sunshine State Parkway (now known as Florida's Turnpike), which connected Miami and Fort Pierce, Florida. By 1958, construction was completed on the City Hall. A fire station was built on Broward Boulevard, with Frederick T. Peters (son of Frederick C. Peters) appointed as the city's fire chief.

Plantation's budget had grown to over $170,000 by 1959. That year, the city's first school was dedicated: Berenice Todd Peters Elementary School (named after the wife of city founder Frederick C. Peters; known today as Peters Elementary) was a 24-classroom, 725-child school, built on 10 acres of land given by Frederick Peters. Hank Donath was appointed as the city's first police chief, with the operating costs of the police department covered by cigarette taxes.

In 1960, the city adopted the slogan "The Dream City", including matching license plates.

The Plantation Library, based out of Peters Elementary School, was founded in 1961, with Helen B. Hoffman as chairwoman and members of the Plantation Woman's Club as volunteer workers. In 1962, Edwin Deicke donated $100,000 to the city for expanding and renovating the Hoffman Building (which was renamed to the Deicke Auditorium in 1973). Also in 1962, the city's chamber of commerce was founded and the Doctors General Hospital was opened.

The city's population reached 8,500 in 1963, and its original motto "From the Wilderness, This City" was made official, with the adoption of a corresponding city seal (designed by Mayor Robinson Estey and architect A.T. Hardel). The Latin translation of this motto was found to include a spelling error; however, future mayor, Frank Veltri opted not to change it. The city's community center, designed by original city master plan architect Russell Pancoast, was built in 1963, becoming the site of the first city library (which had been housed in Peters Elementary).

=== Gulfstream developments (1964–1979) ===
Following the death of Frederick C. Peters in July 1964, the Peters family sold 5,400 acres (22 km^{2}) of undeveloped land west of University Drive (originally named Annapu Road) at approximately $3,000 per acre to the Gulfstream Land Development Company, led by president John H. Cleary. The land is purchased for the development of the Jacaranda community, the intent of which was to build an equivalent to Coral Gables in Broward County.

Other expansions during this time included Plantation Elementary School in 1965, The Florida Air Academy in 1969, Plantation High School (the city's first high school) and Plantation General Hospital (at the time, a 264-bed hospital) in 1966, and a facility for the telecommunications company Motorola in 1969.

The city's population reached 23,523 by 1970, and in 1972, a $1.03 million construction bid was accepted for a new city hall, alongside groundbreaking for construction of the Deicke Auditorium.

Plantation Acres (which is designated a Special Public Interest Rural District to protect the natural landscape) and Melaleuca Isles were annexed into Plantation in 1973. Deicke Auditorium and the new Plantation City Hall were dedicated in May and December of that year respectively. Also in 1973, the Gulfstream consortium acquired the remaining land from the Peters family holdings. Moving away from Plantation's original rural direction, Gulfstream instead targeted commercial, industrial and home office establishments, beginning agreements with Motorola, American Express, and those who would build the Broward Mall. The Plantation Historical Society was founded the following year by Genevieve Veltri, Dorothy O'Hare, Lois Brickhouse, and Marilyn King, with their first meeting held in the Veltri home, and Veltri elected as the first president.

Frank Veltri was elected as the city's mayor for the first time in 1975. Veltri became the city's longest-serving mayor, completing six terms over 24 years. That same year, the financial services company, American Express moved its 'Southern Region Operations Center' to a newly constructed building in Plantation, beginning with 1,000 employees.

During the US bicentennial celebration in 1976, a 45-foot oak tree was planted in Plantation's Fifth Street Park to represent the Liberty Tree. The park was renamed Liberty Tree Park as a result. In 1977, the city and Broward County jointly acquired land which was previously a part of the Peters family farm, and began work on the Plantation Heritage Park, using a grant from the Land and Water Conservation Fund.

The Broward Mall opened in 1978, on what had previously been cow pasture land. At the time, it was the largest mall in the Southern United States, spanning 1 million square feet. 1978 was also the year of the city's silver anniversary, celebrated with three days of events and included the burying of a time capsule to be updated every 25 years.

In 1979, the Florida Air Academy closed, and the land was sold to the Jewish Community Center.

The final home of mobster John Roselli (born 1905), liaison and fixer for the Chicago Outfit in Hollywood, Los Angeles and the Las Vegas Strip was, until June 28, 1976, at his sister Enid and brother-in-law Joseph Daigle's residence at 5220 SW 10th Court, and his murdered body was found in a steel drum in Dumfoundling Bay in Miami on August 9.

=== Recent history (1980–present) ===
By 1980, Plantation's population had reached 48,653. This year is when the city was first designated as a 'Tree City' by the Arbor Day Foundation. The Plantation Library was renamed to the Helen B. Hoffman Plantation Library in the following year.

In 1983, the city opened Plantation Central Park: a 77-acre recreation complex, including an Olympic swimming pool, gym, and spaces for softball, football, soccer, tennis, and basketball. The same year, the former Plantation Chamber of Commerce (a 1,000-square-foot office building) was moved over one mile by truck to a new location. The intent was for the building to be used as a museum building by the Plantation Historical Society; however, it was vandalized and fell from its foundation, requiring demolition as a result. Instead, an alternative, Plantation Historical Museum (founded by Genevieve Veltri) is dedicated in June 1985.

The city's landscape department established the Plantation Landscaping Award for Nurturing our Town (PLANT) awards in 1984, developed as part of the Tree City USA program to reward outstanding landscaping and maintenance. The same year also saw the first opening of the Plantation Heritage Park to the public.

In 1988, 10 years after the opening of the Broward Mall, two new shopping malls were opened in the city: The Fountains Shopping Mall (450,000 square feet at a cost of $60 million) and the Fashion Mall at Plantation (660,000 square feet, featuring Macy's and Lord & Taylor as its anchor stores).

The population reached 66,116 by 1990. The following year, Plantation's PLANT awards recognized Marjory Stoneman Douglas (then 100 years of age) as the "First Lady of Conservation" for her efforts to preserve the Everglades.

The insurance company Kemper National Services first opened operations in Plantation in 1993, and in the following year, announced plans to double its office space in the city and hire up to 800 additional employees. At the time, the city's largest employers were American Express, followed by Motorola.

During the 100th anniversary of the modern Olympic Games in 1996, the relay run of the Olympic Flame passed through Plantation city center. In September of this year, a fire at the Plantation Towne Mall became the city's largest fire to date, impacting 56,000 square feet of the mall. Following the fire, the area was re-built as Plantation Towne Square, including a new Publix as its anchor store.

The year 2000 census established the city population at 82,934, spanning 15 distinct ethnic groups. New city developments around this time included the 11,500-square-foot (1,070 m^{2}) Volunteer Park Community Center (1999), the Park East Multicultural Garden (2001), the Community Bus Service (2001), Jim Ward 16,000 sq ft (1,500 m^{2}) Community Center (2002), Jack Carter Harmony Park (2002), Happy Tails Dog Park (2002), the Plantation Equestrian Center (2005), and the Plantation Preserve Golf Course and Club (2006).

Plantation celebrated its 50-year golden anniversary in 2003, with a one-week celebration and updating of the city's time capsule.

Hurricane Wilma hit Plantation on Monday, October 24, 2005, causing significant damage and power outages. The resulting damage led to the subsequent closure of the Fashion Mall in 2006.

In 2007, the Broward Mall was acquired by the Westfield Group, received a multimillion-dollar renovation, and was renamed to Westfield Broward.

The city was first named one as of the nation's "100 Best Communities for Young People" by America's Promise Alliance in 2008. It has won this award on other subsequent years, including 2010 and 2011.

The 2010 census established the city's population at 84,955 people. During this year, the vacant former Fashion Mall was planned for auction, but the auction was canceled after the property owner paid a court judgement.

In 2011, Diane Veltri Bendekovic, daughter of previous long-running mayor Frank Veltri, was elected as mayor of the city.

The city's 60th anniversary in 2013 saw the publication of a new book dedicated to its history: Images of America: Plantation.

The developers of the previously closed Fashion Mall filed for bankruptcy in October 2014. The property was then sold in a bankruptcy auction in April 2015 for $37.7 million. Demolition of the former Fashion Mall then began in 2016 (leaving the existing hotel, office and parking areas), to make way for Plantation Walk (previously known as 321 North): a $350 million complex including 700 apartments, 200,000 square feet of retail and restaurants, and remodeled versions of the existing 160,000-square-foot office tower and Sheraton hotel. In September 2018, a settlement was reached, dismissing legal conflicts between the area's bankruptcy trustee and other parties previously involved in the redevelopment. The development was targeting completion in 2021.

The American Express office in Plantation closed in 2017 when the company moved to a facility in neighboring Sunrise, Florida. In response to the move, committee review began on 'Plantation Midtown': a new 25-acre (0.10 km^{2}) mixed-use development, encompassing the site of the former American Express office.

On July 6, 2019, 23 people were injured, two seriously, by a gas explosion at the Market on University shopping plaza on South University Drive, which caused extensive damage to it and nearby buildings. The explosion occurred due to People's Gas, a division of TECO Energy, failing to close and lock a gas line after a customer request dating back to December 2018, in violation of Federal and Florida law.

In June 2020, following the George Floyd protests some residents called for the city, along with certain local schools whose names include the word "plantation", to be renamed due to the connotation of the word "plantation" with slavery in the American South. There were many suggestions for new names, one of the main suggestions being Jacaranda, the name of various plazas and neighborhoods in the city. Other suggestions included Evergreen, North Davie, Greene City, and Everglades City. The city's name has no direct links to slavery and other residents expressed opposition to renaming.

In 2021, Westfield Mall returned to its previous name of Broward Mall following the fall of the Westfield Group.

== Geography ==
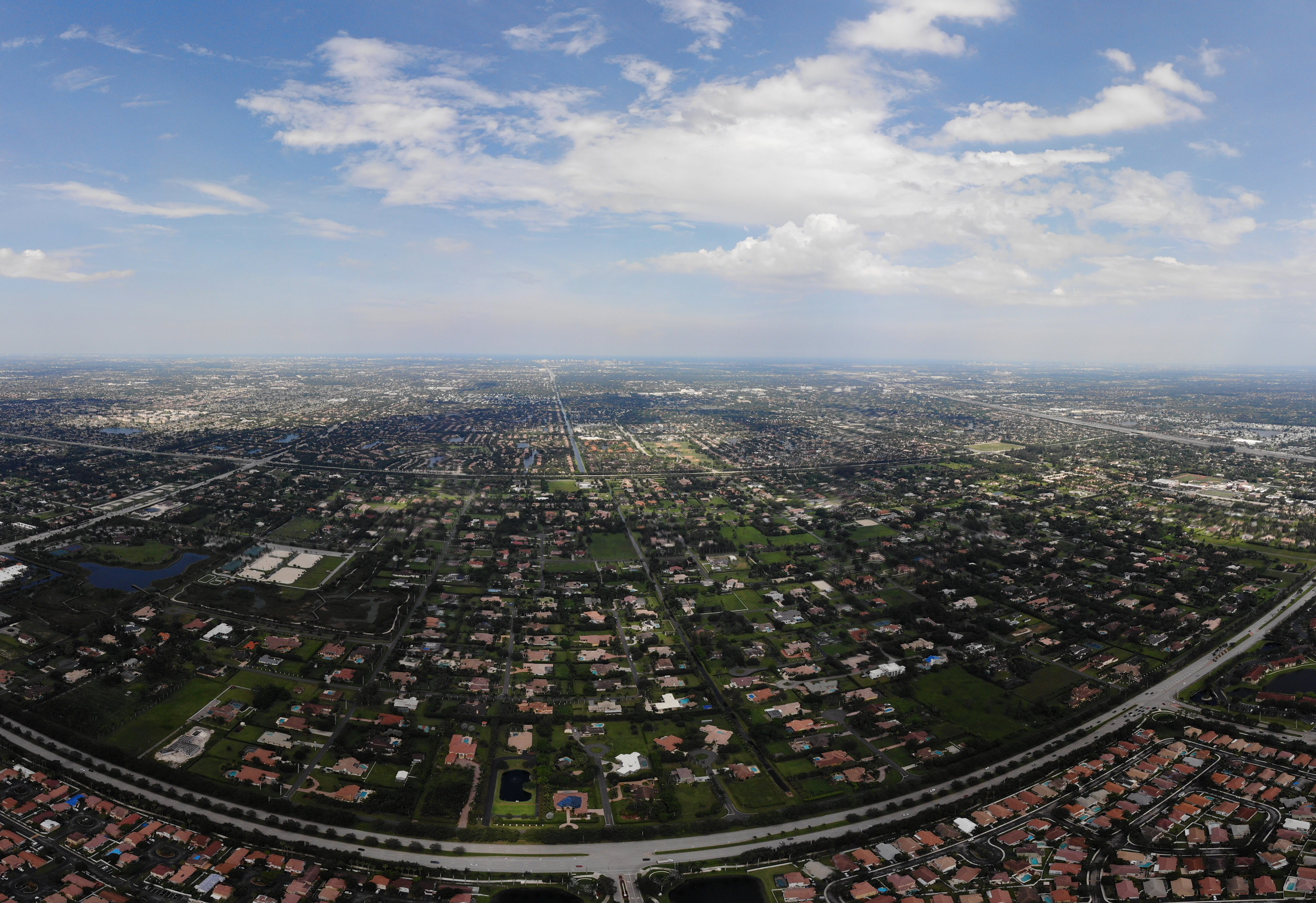
East-facing aerial photo of Plantation. Flamingo Road (bottom) separates Plantation from Sunrise.

=== Land size ===
As of the 2010 census, the city has a total area of 21.93 square miles (57 km^{2}), of which 21.74 square miles (56 km^{2}) is land and 0.19 square miles (0 km^{2}) (0.87%) is water.

=== Location and surroundings ===
Plantation is in central Broward County and is bordered by Lauderhill to the northeast, Sunrise to the north and west, Davie to the south, and Fort Lauderdale to the east.

=== Climate ===
Plantation has a tropical rainforest climate (Af), bordering a tropical monsoon climate (Am) due to the driest month of December's precipitation being near the 60mm threshold separating these categories.

On average, August is the hottest month, with an average high of 90.0 °F (32.2 °C), whilst January is the coolest month, with an average low of 57.0 °F (13.9 °C) and a record low of 28.0 °F (−2.2 °C).

Full monthly statistics for the city are as follows:

Climate data for Plantation, Florida
Month	Jan	Feb	Mar	Apr	May	Jun	Jul	Aug	Sep	Oct	Nov	Dec	Year
Record high °F (°C)	88.0 (31.1)	94.0 (34.4)	92.0 (33.3)	94.0 (34.4)	98.0 (36.7)	98.0 (36.7)	99.0 (37.2)	98.0 (36.7)	98.0 (36.7)	98.0 (36.7)	91.0 (32.8)	89.0 (31.7)	99.0 (37.2)
Mean daily maximum °F (°C)	75.0 (23.9)	77.0 (25.0)	79.0 (26.1)	82.0 (27.8)	86.0 (30.0)	89.0 (31.7)	90.0 (32.2)	90.0 (32.2)	89.0 (31.7)	86.0 (30.0)	81.0 (27.2)	77.0 (25.0)	83.4 (28.6)
Mean daily minimum °F (°C)	57.0 (13.9)	59.0 (15.0)	62.0 (16.7)	66.0 (18.9)	71.0 (21.7)	75.0 (23.9)	75.0 (23.9)	76.0 (24.4)	75.0 (23.9)	72.0 (22.2)	66.0 (18.9)	60.0 (15.6)	67.8 (19.9)
Record low °F (°C)	28.0 (−2.2)	31.0 (−0.6)	32.0 (0.0)	40.0 (4.4)	54.0 (12.2)	60.0 (15.6)	64.0 (17.8)	66.0 (18.9)	61.0 (16.1)	47.0 (8.3)	35.0 (1.7)	30.0 (−1.1)	28.0 (−2.2)
Average precipitation inches (mm)	2.62 (67)	3.36 (85)	3.58 (91)	3.52 (89)	6.20 (157)	9.81 (249)	7.41 (188)	8.00 (203)	9.45 (240)	6.40 (163)	3.90 (99)	2.39 (61)	66.64 (1,692)
Source: The Weather Channel (Monthly Forecast)

== Demographics ==
Historical population
Census	Pop.	Note	%±
1960	4,772		—
1970	23,523		392.9%
1980	48,653		106.8%
1990	66,692		37.1%
2000	82,934		24.4%
2010	84,955		2.4%
2020	91,750		8.0%
2025 (est.)	99,183	▲	8.1%
US Decennial Census

=== Racial and ethnic composition ===
Historical demographics	2020	2010	2000	1990	1980
White (non-Hispanic)	41.4%	53.7%	68.0%	84.0%	94.8%
Hispanic or Latino	28.0%	20.4%	13.1%	8.1%	3.5%
Black or African American (non-Hispanic)	20.7%	19.4%	13.4%	5.8%	0.9%
Asian and Pacific Islander (non-Hispanic)	4.5%	3.8%	2.9%	1.8%	0.8%
Native American (non-Hispanic)	0.1%	0.2%	0.1%	0.1%	0.8%
Some Other Race (non-Hispanic)	1.1%	0.5%	0.4%	0.1%	0.8%
Two or more races (non-Hispanic)	4.2%	2.0%	2.1%	N/A	N/A
Population	91,750	84,955	82,934	66,692	48,501

Plantation, Florida – Racial and ethnic composition Note: the US census treats Hispanic/Latino as an ethnic category. This table excludes Latinos from the racial categories and assigns them to a separate category. Hispanics/Latinos may be of any race.
Race / Ethnicity (NH = Non-Hispanic)	Pop 2000	Pop 2010	Pop 2020	% 2000	% 2010	% 2020
White (NH)	56,411	45,599	37,976	68.02%	53.67%	41.39%
Black or African American (NH)	11,101	16,470	18,961	13.39%	19.39%	20.67%
Native American or Alaska Native (NH)	107	146	135	0.13%	0.17%	0.15%
Asian (NH)	2,359	3,221	4,146	2.84%	3.79%	4.52%
Native Hawaiian or Pacific Islander alone (NH)	36	46	26	0.04%	0.05%	0.03%
Other race (NH)	337	422	1,003	0.41%	0.50%	1.09%
Mixed race or Multiracial (NH)	1,723	1,679	3,815	2.08%	1.98%	4.16%
Hispanic or Latino (any race)	10,860	17,372	25,688	13.09%	20.45%	28.00%
Total	82,934	84,955	91,750	100.00%	100.00%	100.00%

=== 2020 census ===
As of the 2020 census, Plantation had a population of 91,750. The median age was 41.3 years. 19.5% of residents were under the age of 18 and 17.6% of residents were 65 years of age or older. For every 100 females there were 89.6 males, and for every 100 females age 18 and over there were 86.8 males age 18 and over.

100.0% of residents lived in urban areas, while 0.0% lived in rural areas.

There were 36,653 households in Plantation, of which 28.9% had children under the age of 18 living in them. Of all households, 46.1% were married-couple households, 17.0% were households with a male householder and no spouse or partner present, and 29.8% were households with a female householder and no spouse or partner present. About 26.4% of all households were made up of individuals and 10.0% had someone living alone who was 65 years of age or older.

There were 22,738 families residing in the city.

There were 38,596 housing units, of which 5.0% were vacant. The homeowner vacancy rate was 0.9% and the rental vacancy rate was 6.8%.

Racial composition as of the 2020 census
Race	Number	Percent
White	43,919	47.9%
Black or African American	19,549	21.3%
American Indian and Alaska Native	246	0.3%
Asian	4,256	4.6%
Native Hawaiian and Other Pacific Islander	41	0.0%
Some other race	6,291	6.9%
Two or more races	17,448	19.0%

=== 2010 census ===
==== Households ====
As of the 2010 US census, there were 84,955 people, 34,211 households, and 22,156 families residing in the city.

Also as of 2010, 66.0% of the 34,190 total households were family households, 47.7% were husband-wife households, and 28.5% included a child under 18 years. 26.3% of all households were made up of individual householders living alone, and 8.3% had someone living alone who was 65 years of age or older. The average household size was 2.47 and the average family size was 3.01.

==== Age and gender ====
As of 2010, the median age of the city's population was 39.7 years, with the age distribution of 23.5% 19 years or younger (21.5% under the age of 18); 26.9% from 20 to 39 years; 30.0% from 40 to 59 years; 17.5% from 60 to 84 years; and 2.1% 85 years or older.

In 2010, the population was 52.6% female, with a 53.5% female population aged over 18 years.

=== Employment and income ===
According to a 2013–2017 American Community Survey estimate, the per capita income for the city (in 2017 inflation-adjusted dollars) was $35,897, the median household income was $69,531, and the median family income was $78,839. The median earnings for a full-time, year-round male worker was $54,188, compared to $44,537 for the female equivalent.

Between 2013 and 2017, the estimate also identified 9.0% of the city's population (6.7% of families) below the poverty line, including 11.8% of those under age 18 and 5.2% of those age 65 or over.

Between 2013 and 2017, he largest area of occupation (for civilians aged 16 and older) was in management, business, science, and arts occupations (43.4%), followed by sales and office occupations (28.9%).

=== 2000 census ===
==== Language ====
As of the 2000 census, first language distribution in the city was 78.01% English, 13.00% Spanish, 2.24% French Creole, 1.31% French, 0.72% Hebrew, 0.72% Portuguese, 0.59% Italian, 0.55% German, 0.46% Arabic, and 2.40% for all others.

== Economy ==
A 2012 survey of business owners identified a total of 13,674 companies within the city. An economic census, also from 2012, determined that total retail sales in the city amounted to $1.72 billion.

Specific companies with operations in Plantation include DHL (Express Head Office: United States), the University of Phoenix (South Florida Campus), and TradeStation. Companies with former locations in Plantation include American Express (1975 to 2017), and Motorola (1969 to 2015).

=== Malls ===
Plantation was home to two malls, situated across the street from one another: the Westfield Broward Mall (south of Broward Boulevard), and the Fashion Mall (north of Broward Boulevard); however, the Fashion Mall was closed in 2006 and is currently in the process of being re-developed for the Plantation Walk project.

=== Golf and country clubs ===
The oldest club in the city is the 293 acre Fort Lauderdale Country Club, which was first founded in 1926 (despite setbacks caused by the 1926 Miami hurricane). When first opened, the 6,661-yard course was known as the West Side Golf Course, and was owned by the city of Fort Lauderdale; however, the course was renamed in December 1928 when it was leased by Fort Lauderdale. In 1951, the club was expanded with a second 18-hole, 6,915-yard 'North Course'. Though originally a public club, it became a private club in 1957, when it was sold by the city of Fort Lauderdale. The club's original 'South Course' was designed by Joseph A. Roseman, Hebert Charles Tippet, and George Richardson Sr., and subsequently re-designed by Charles Ankrom (1991) and Kipp Schulties (2006). The North Course was designed by Robert 'Red' F. Lawrence, then re-designed by Tom Pearson (1999) and Kipp Schulties (2006).

The first club not owned by Fort Lauderdale, the Plantation Golf Course and Country Club, was designed by Robert 'Red' F. Lawrence and original city master plan architect Russell Pancoast, opening in 1950. Following discovery of a Native American burial mound on the site of the 14th hole during construction, each hole on the course was given a different Native American name to honor the area's previous Seminole and Tequesta residents. In addition to the golf course, the club included a swimming pool, tennis courts, and a clubhouse.

Another of the city's private golf courses is the 162 acre Lago Mar Country Club (not to be confused with Mar-a-Lago). Established in 1969, Lago Mar was purchased from its original builders in 1980 and re-designed in 2009 by Kipp Schulties, reopening on January 1, 2010. The club includes teeing grounds from 5,811 to 6,756 yards and other facilities such as private tennis courts.

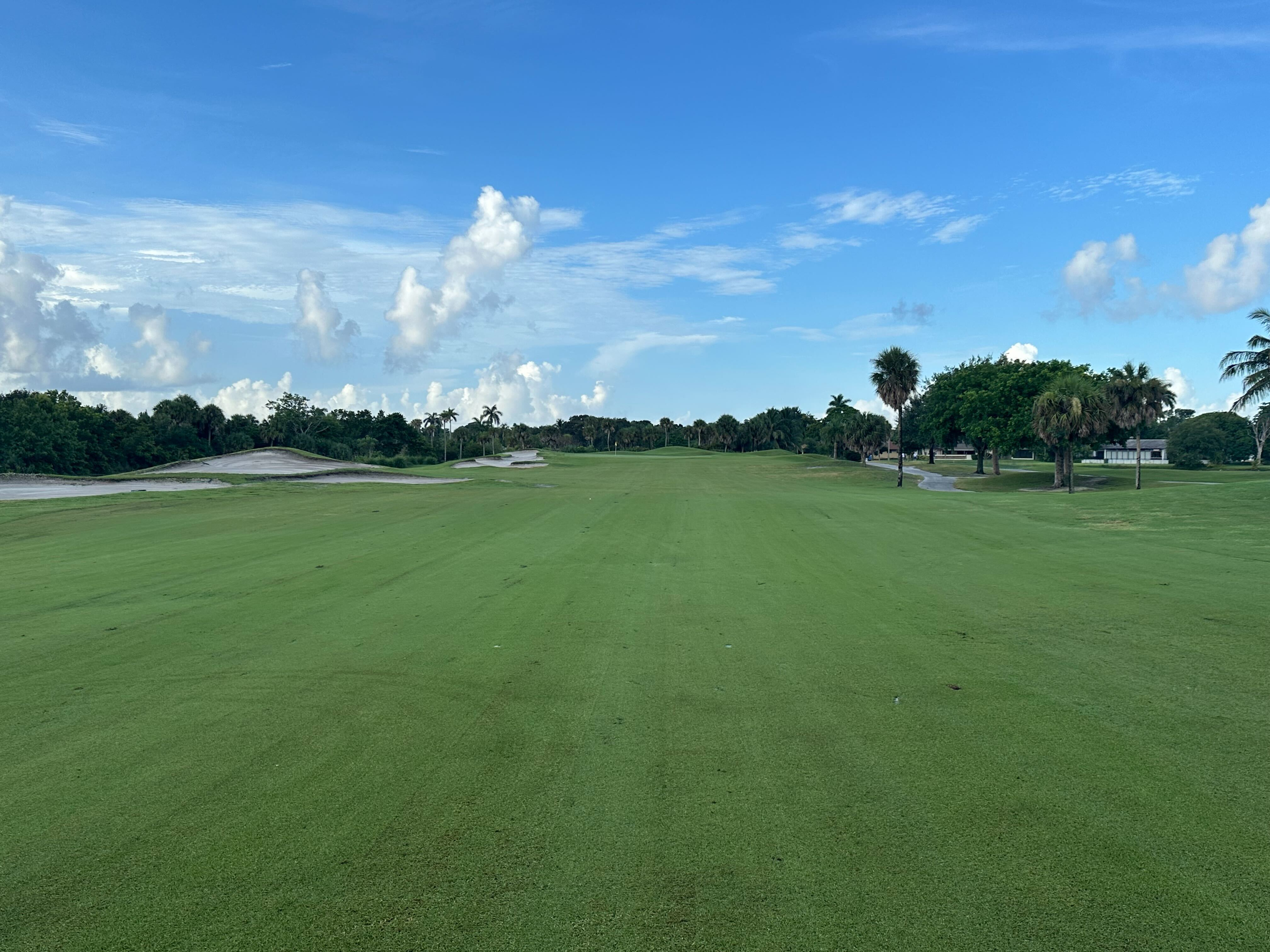
Plantation Preserve Golf Course & Club in July 2024

Another public (though privately owned) club within the city is the Jacaranda Golf Club: a 285-acre, 7,247 yard course designed by Mark Mahannah and built 1970, then redesigned by Bobby Weed in 2006.

Work on a new city-owned golf course began in 2002, when the city purchased the property of the original Plantation Golf Course and commenced the new 'Plantation Preserve' development. This development work resulted in the Plantation Preserve Golf Course and Club: a 214-acre, 7,148 yard course, designed by Robert von Hagge, Michael Smelek, and Rick Baril, which was dedicated in April 2006.

== Education ==
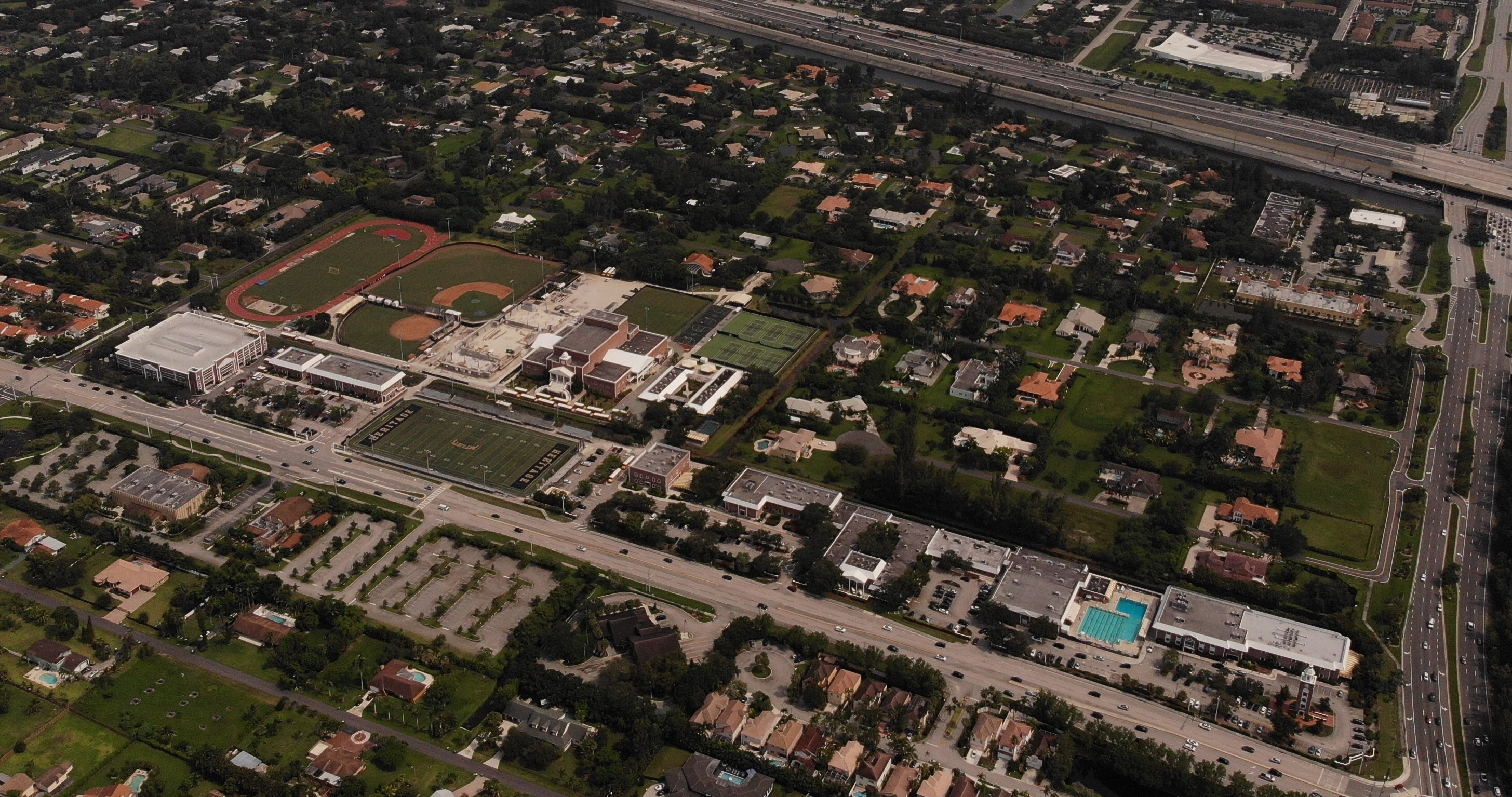
Aerial photo of American Heritage School

According to a 2013–2017 American Community Survey estimate, 93.4% of the city have attained high school graduation or a higher level of education. 25.4% have a bachelor's degree, and 17.4% have a graduate or professional degree.

Plantation is served by Broward County Public Schools.

Public high schools

- Plantation High School
- South Plantation High School

Plantation middle schools

- Plantation Middle School
- Seminole Middle School
- Bair Middle School in Sunrise, Florida (serves parts of Plantation)

Public elementary schools

- Central Park Elementary School
- Mirror Lake Elementary School
- Peters Elementary School
- Plantation Elementary School
- Plantation Park Elementary School
- Tropical Elementary School
- Sawgrass Elementary School in Sunrise (serves parts of Plantation)

Private schools

- American Heritage School and American Academy
- The Blake School
- Our Savior Lutheran
- St. Gregory's Parish School of the Roman Catholic Archdiocese of Miami

Higher education

- University of Phoenix

== Media ==
Plantation is part of the Miami-Fort Lauderdale-Hollywood media market, which is the sixteenth largest media market, the eleventh largest radio market, and the sixteenth largest television market in the United States.

The city's primary daily newspapers are the South Florida Sun-Sentinel and The Miami Herald, and their Spanish-language counterparts El Sentinel and El Nuevo Herald.

Plantation has also been used as a filming location for feature films, such as Caddyshack in 1980 (the Plantation Country Club was used for the film's pool scenes), and There's Something About Mary in 1998 (the film's high school is actually Plantation City Hall, located at 400 NW 73rd Avenue).

== Notable people ==
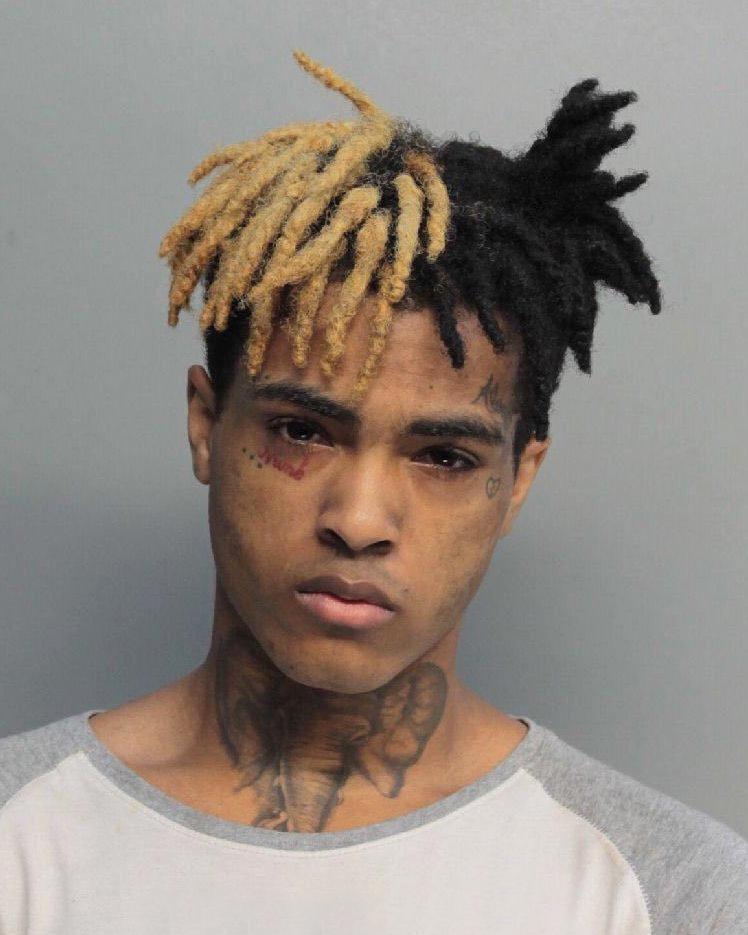
XXXTentacion

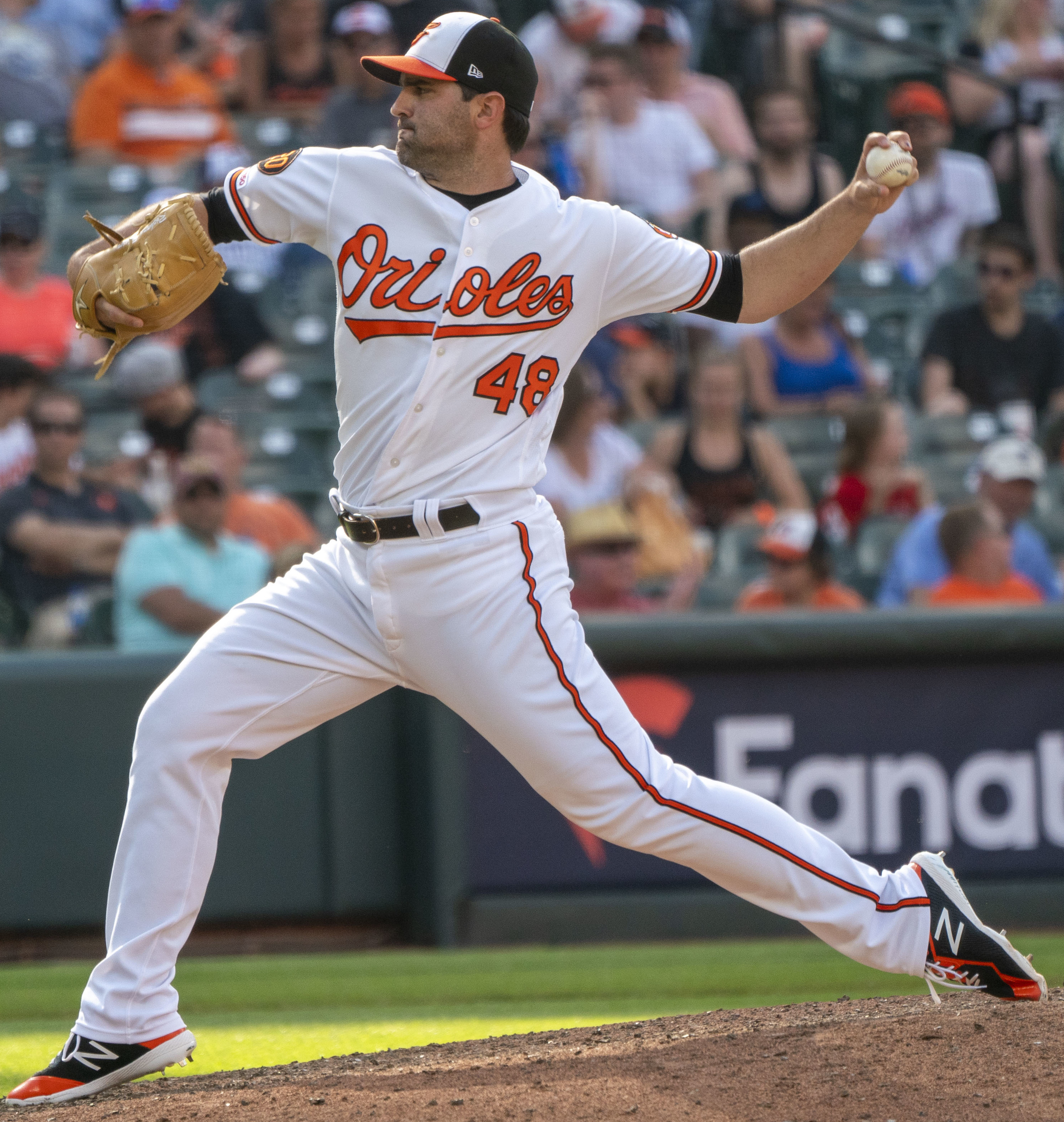
Richard Bleier

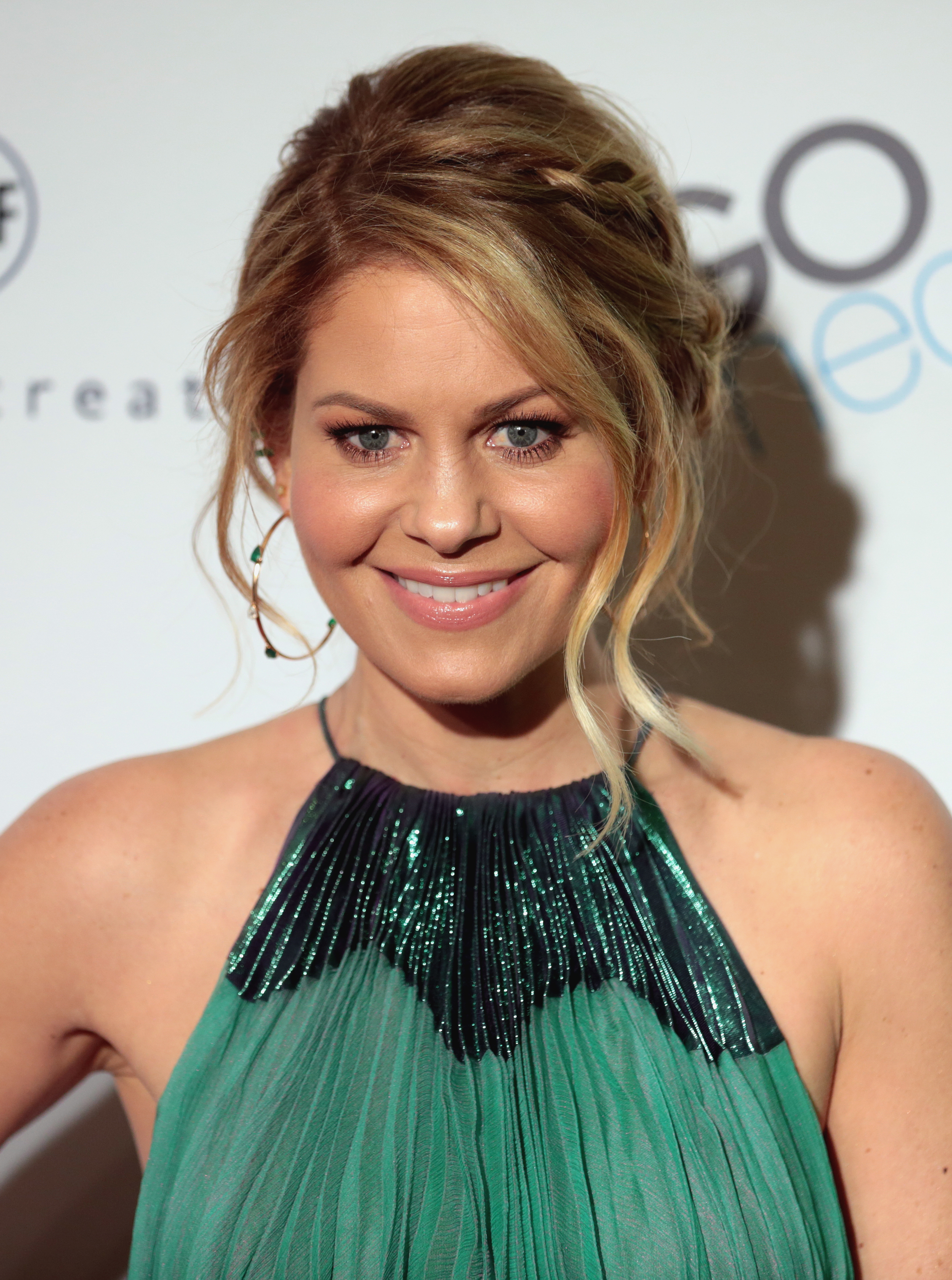
Candace Cameron

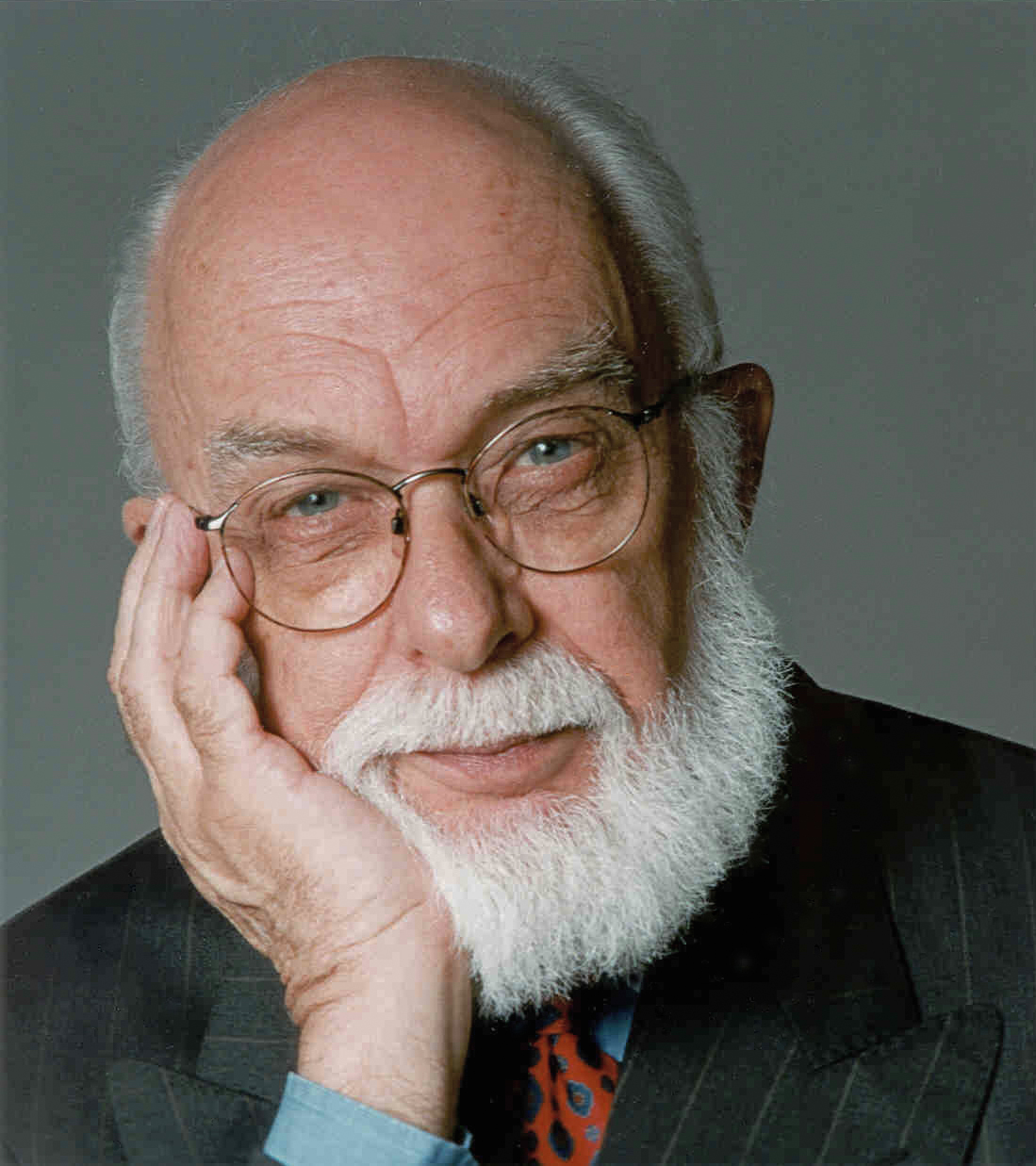
James Randi

- Somy Ali (born 1976), former Bollywood actress, writer, model, filmmaker, and activist
- Melanie Amaro (born 1992), singer, first season winner of The X Factor USA
- Daniel Berger (born 1993), professional PGA Tour golfer
- Randy Bernsen, guitarist and jazz composer
- Horatio Benedict "H.B." Blades Jr., NFL player
- Richard Bleier (born 1987), MLB pitcher with the Boston Red Sox
- Chris Britton, MLB player
- Valeri Bure, NHL player
- Candace Cameron, actress
- Luis Castillo, MLB player
- Audra Cohen, tennis player
- Kassidy Cook, Olympic diver
- Steve Curry, MLB player
- Alberto Cutié, Episcopal priest and pastor of St. Benedict's Parish
- Wayne Federman, actor, comedian, and biographer of Pistol Pete Maravich
- Blake Geoffrion, NHL player
- Mike Gioulakis, cinematographer
- Chad Henne, NFL player
- Carl Hiaasen, novelist and journalist
- Rob Hiaasen, journalist and editor
- Michael Hill, MLB executive
- Greg Ira, racing driver
- Tyler Kinley, MLB player
- Ty Law (born 1974), NFL player
- Barry Leibowitz (born 1945), American-Israeli basketball player
- Jonathan Lewis (born 1997), soccer player
- Jake Long, NFL player
- Jaycob Megna, ice hockey player
- Camila Mendes, actress
- Alicia Minshew, actress
- Bob Norman, journalist
- James Randi, stage magician and scientific skeptic
- Darrelle Revis, NFL player
- Josh Robinson, NFL player
- John Roselli (1905–1976), mobster
- Seymour Schwartzman, opera singer and cantor
- Ryan Shazier, NFL player
- Ski Mask The Slump God (legal name Stokeley Goulbourne; 1996), rapper
- Patrick Staropoli, ophthalmologist and professional stock car racing driver
- Sloane Stephens, professional tennis player
- Patrick Surtain, NFL player
- Zach Thomas, NFL player
- Allen West (born 1961), congressman
- XXXTentacion (full name Jahseh Dwayne Ricardo Onfroy, 1998–2018), rapper

== See also ==
- Florida land boom of the 1920s
- Broward County, Florida
- Everglades
