= Plantation Towne Mall =

Shopping mall in Plantation, Florida

Coordinates: 26.120966°N 80.239414°W

The Plantation Towne Mall was an enclosed shopping mall in Plantation, Florida, which was destroyed by a fire on September 6, 1996. The shopping mall originally opened in 1968 as an open-air shopping plaza with a Publix Supermarket on its west end, and a Rite Aid Drug Store (vacant space during the fire) and movie theater (called Towne Theatre, but later Art Towne Twin until closing) on its east. In 1971, the center was enclosed by a metal roof, while original roofing was not removed. By 1991, the mall had undergone both interior and exterior renovations, converting the vacant theater space into offices, and cladding the exterior in stucco with mansard mall entryways.

One of the major reasons why the fire was able to spread so quickly, and had been so difficult to extinguish was because flames were able to seep in between the roofs. In addition to this, the mall wasn't equipped with a sprinkler system.

The shopping mall was rebuilt as Plantation Towne Square, a strip mall anchored by a new Publix store.
