= Kyle Pope =

American editor and publisher

- Occupations: Editor; Publisher
- Known for: Editor and publisher of the Columbia Journalism Review
- Spouse: Kate Kelly
- Children: 3

Kyle Pope is an American journalist who is the editor and publisher of the Columbia Journalism Review.

== Biography ==
Pope has worked as editor of the New York Observer, the Wall Street Journal, Portfolio magazine and as editor in chief of Straus News. In 2016, he was hired by the Columbia Journalism Review as editor and publisher replacing Elizabeth Spayd, who accepted a position as public editor of The New York Times. In an interview with Brian Stelter of CNN, Pope stated that after the election of President Donald Trump, the news media needs to rethink how it covers the news in order to "retake the agenda from this man who so hungers for attention, and how do we tell stories in a way that reflects the scale and sweep of the moment we're in?"

On July 24, 2017, in Washington, D.C., Pope addressed the House Judiciary Committee bipartisan Forum on Press Freedoms regarding concerns that the actions of Donald Trump during his campaign for and following election as President of the United States undermine the constitutional freedom of the press.

== Personal life ==
Pope is married to investigative journalist Kate Kelly; they have three children together.
