= Kate Kelly (journalist) =

American journalist

- Born: February 24, 1975 (age 51)
- Education: Columbia University (BA)
- Occupations: Journalist; Writer
- Spouse: Kyle Pope
- Children: 3

Kate Kelly (born February 24, 1975) is an American reporter for The New York Times.

== Biography ==
Kelly was raised in Washington, D.C. She is a graduate of the National Cathedral School after which she attended Columbia University where she received a B.A. in history in 1997. After school, she worked for Time magazine and the New York Observer where she wrote a weekly residential real-estate column, "Manhattan Transfers." she then worked for The Wall Street Journal for ten years as an investigative journalist and then in 2010 she was hired by CNBC as an on-air reporter. In 2016, she was hired by The New York Times as their business reporter.

Kelly is also the author, with Robin Pogrebin, of The Education of Brett Kavanaugh: An Investigation with a publishing date in September 2019 from Portfolio Books, a division of Penguin Random House. Before publication, the Times published a widely criticised essay adapted from the book that primarily addressed accusations about an incident with Deborah Ramirez and another incident alleged by Max Stier, both of which occurred at Yale. Before Kavanaugh's confirmation in October, 2018, Pogrebin, also at the Times and a classmate of Kavanaugh at Yale, and Kelly, were featured in a podcast about what the then-judge's classmates were saying concerning his nomination to the Supreme Court.

== Personal life ==
Kelly is married to editor Kyle Pope; she has three daughters.

== Awards ==
- 2004 Gerald Loeb Award for Deadline Writing
- 2008 Gerald Loeb Award for Beat Writing
- 2009 Livingston Award for Excellence in National Reporting
