= Todd Joseph Smith =

American body builder

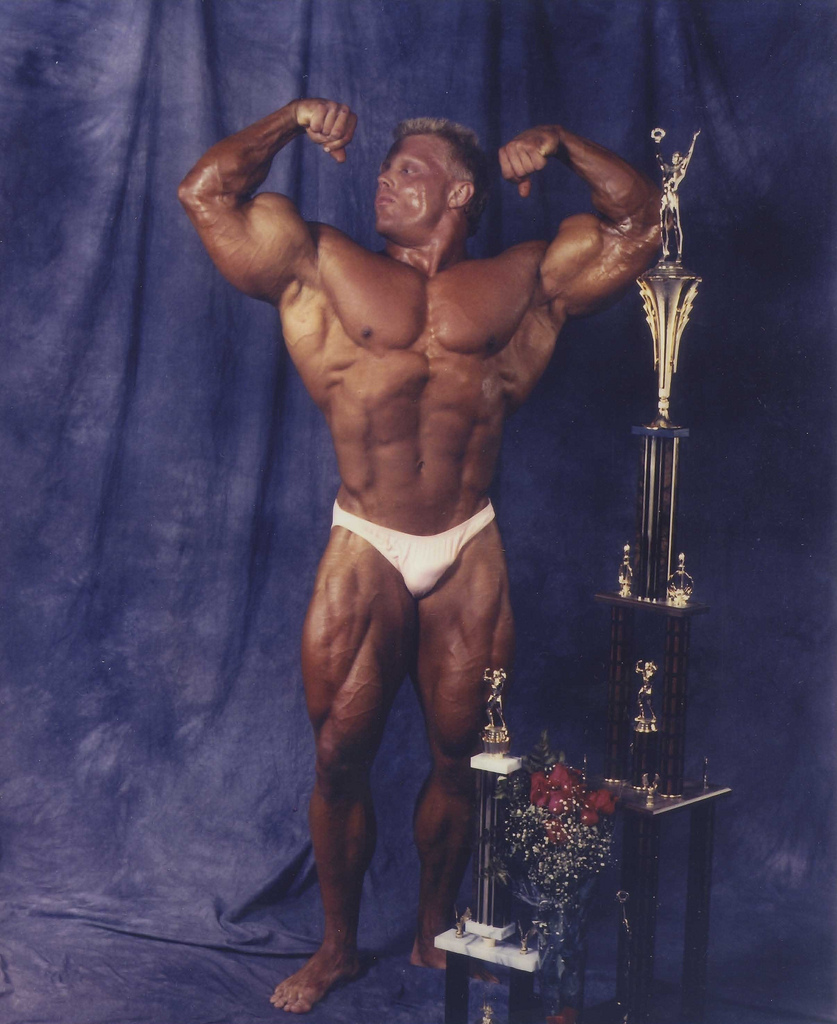

Todd 'The Bod' Smith is an American body builder, personal trainer, health and exercise writer, and businessman.

== Biography ==
Some of the mentors Smith studied under were:

1. Vince Gironda (The Iron Guru): Vince understood biomechanics and the role exercise has in sculpting the human body. Vince owned a gym in North Hollywood for over 40 years and helped many movie stars transform their bodies. Todd read all Vince's books and spent one-month training with him at his gym. While his training style was unorthodox, the results he delivered were unprecedented. Vince's philosophies have left a huge impact on Todd to this day.
2. Larry Scott: Larry was the first man to win bodybuilding's biggest title: Mr. Olympia. Larry was a disciple of Vince Gironda's but he was also a master in the science of nutrition. Larry understood the glycemic index and taught Todd the importance of supplementation to attain optimal results. Todd spent two weeks training with Larry in Utah in 1981, and utilized him as an advisor for many years.
3. Arthur Jones: He developed the Nautilus line of workout equipment, and was the first person to understand the role of muscle in stimulating the metabolic rate. Todd read all of his books and spent a week with him in Florida training under his guidance.
4. Bill Pearl: Bill was the greatest bodybuilder in the world during the 1950s and 1960s. Todd read all Bill's books and had the honor to speak at length with him on many occasions. Bill shared with Todd all his nutritional nuances and his incredible ability to overcome adversity in the pursuit of his dreams.

Smith was able to compete and take third in the 1986 Mr. USA. Once he had finished school he opened up his own gym. After five years it was purchased by 24 Hour Fitness. After two years of research Smith introduced “Todd Smith’s ‘I Can Do It’ Total Lifestyle Program.” He created an infomercial and successfully sold this program to over 70,000 participants. During that same span of time he won the 1999 National Steroid Free Bodybuilding Championship in Venice Beach, California. After winning the competition he became a contributing author to Ironman Magazine.

Then Todd traveled extensively as a management consultant for the health club industry. He was able to travel all around the USA helping club owners improve their bottom line as well as assist trainers to create better and more effective fitness and nutrition programs for their customers.

Currently Todd lives and works out of Omaha, Nebraska. He is still active with his online training courses. In addition he owns and operates a small fitness-training studio called Todd Smith Fitness. Established in 2013, Todd became a franchise owner of Nutrishop. Todd is also still competing and training. In 2010 he won the overall INBA United States Natural Bodybuilding Championship and Las Vegas Forever Natural

== Personal life ==
In 2002, Todd met and married his wife Carmen. A year later they had their first child, a daughter named Katie. In 2008 they had a son, J.T.f

== Bodybuilding titles and awards ==
- Mr. Phoenix
- Mr. Arizona
- Mr. Nebraska
- Mr. USA AAU
- NPC Natural Southern States
- NPC Ironman Natural Nationals
- NPC Iron Man National Camp
- INBA Over 40 Mr. America
- 2010 International Natural Bodybuilding Championship, INBA, Over 40 Mr. Universe, 2nd Place
- 2011 International Natural Bodybuilding Championship, INBA, Over 40 Mr. Universe, 1st Place
