= Murder of Todd Smith =

1989 murder of American journalist in Peru

Todd Smith, an American journalist, was killed in Peru in November 1989. Smith was the first foreign journalist to be killed in Peru's internal conflict.

== Life and career ==
Smith was born in Jacksonville, Florida. He graduated from Washington and Lee University with an English degree in 1983. He worked at the St. Petersburg Times and the Tampa Tribune, in addition to freelance reporting work. In 1987 he spent 10 weeks traveling with the Nicaraguan Contras, publishing a series in the St. Petersburg Times and the San Francisco Chronicle on his return.

== Murder ==
Smith's body was found near the town of Uchiza in the Upper Huallaga Valley. He had travelled there to investigate links between Shining Path guerrillas and cocaine traffickers, both of which were common in the area. He was 28. A wooden sign was found near his body reading: "In this way die North American spies linked to the Pentagon who are carrying out an anti-subversive plan in Latin America and especially in Peru. Death to the North American imperialism. Long live the Communist Party. Long live the war of the people."

Investigation by the Interior Ministry revealed that Smith was captured by the rebels and sold to drug traffickers for $30,000. Lima-based daily periodical Ultima Hora in its issue of February 1, 1992, claiming to have identified Smith's killers, reported that he had discovered a drug laboratory and a shipment of coca paste leaving an airport in a jungle, prior to his capture. The newspaper, however, denied any connection of Shining Path to his death.

== Aftermath ==
Washington and Lee University established a fellowship in Smith's name in 1990.

In April 1993, a secret counterterrorism court convicted Shining Path member José Manrique of taking part in the murder and sentenced him to 30 years imprisonment. Manrique was released early under unclear circumstances. Transcripts from the trial that were leaked in 2004 implicated the drug trafficker Fernando Zevallos in the killing.
