= Bob Norman =

American journalist

Bob Norman (born April 12, 1969) is a journalist in South Florida who serves as the news director for the Florida Center for Government Accountability (publisher of the Florida Trident) and as contributing writer for Columbia Journalism Review. He previously worked at WPLG-Channel 10 beginning in 2011 as an on-air investigative reporter. Norman worked for several years as a weekly newspaper and online columnist. He broke the corruption story of $1 billion Ponzi scheme operator Scott Rothstein's October 27, 2009 flight to Morocco under suspicious circumstances. Rothstein, who returned to face inquiries, is a former Fort Lauderdale attorney investigated by the Federal Bureau of Investigation and arrested on 1 December 2009. In 2008 Bob Norman reported an unusual circumstance following the murder of Melissa Britt Lewis, employee of Rothstein Rosenfeldt Adler (RRA) law firm, wherein the prosecuting attorney in the Lewis murder case came to work with RRA two months after the murder. Rothstein has not been connected to the murder, however murder victim Ms. Lewis had been close to Debra Villegas, RRA Chief Operating Officer, whose husband Tony Villegas was identified as the murderer by the City of Plantation Police represented by Scott Rothstein.

Norman, who has also exposed other public corruption such as illegal activities of Broward County, Florida public officials, formerly wrote for New Times Broward-Palm Beach, and browardpalmbeach.com as well as the Miami New Times, all owned by Village Voice Media. His work exposing wrongdoing at the North Broward Hospital District (Broward Health) prompted then-Gov. Jeb Bush to fire the CEO and General Counsel as well as remove six of seven members of the board from that agency. In the aftermath of the terrorist attacks on September 11, 2001, Norman reported on chronic failures of the federal Immigration and Naturalization Services departmen that led to Mohamed Atta being allowed into the U.S. The piece also detailed the undue influence and pressure on immigration agents by the airline industry to rush their work, sometimes at the expense of safety. For that reporting, Tom Brokaw presented Norman with the Livingston Award for Young Journalists in 2002. His reporting is also credited with leading to the criminal conviction of Hollywood City Commissioner Keith Wasserstrom, criminal corruption charges against Deerfield Beach Mayor Al Capellini, Broward County Commissioner Diana Wasserman-Rubin and the removal of Broward Circuit Judge Ana Gardiner for improper conduct and the resignation of Broward County Judge Claudia Robinson from the bench after Norman's work prompted a Judicial Qualifications Commission investigation into alleged favoritism on the bench.

Until 2006, Norman maintained his online column The Daily Pulp (former site). Norman then moved his posts to The Daily Pulp: Bob Norman's Blog on browardpalmbeach.com. Norman's blog remained with New Times Broward-Palm Beach until 2011, when his blog then became part of WPLG-Channel 10's website

A resident of Plantation, Florida, Bob Norman is married to South Florida Sun-Sentinel investigations editor Brittany Wallman. and is a graduate of the University of Kentucky. Bob Norman moved to Broward County in 1998, after working 5 years as a crime reporter in Fort Myers, Florida.

== Journalism awards ==
Bob Norman has won several journalism awards, for example, 1st Place in the National Association of Newspaper Columnists awards, 1st Place in the 2007 "Column-Political" by the Association of Alternative Weeklies, the Livingston Award for Young Journalists, in National Reporting, 2001, 1st Place in the Society of Professional Journalists in 2002 for Print Weekly/Monthly (Non-Deadline Reporting), and 1st Place in the National Association of Black Journalists, 2005.

== Bob Norman's blog: The Daily Pulp ==
Describing his blog in 2007 as doing "fair to middling", by 2009 it surged in reader engagement, based on the volume of online postings, over allegations of public corruption in Broward County School Board construction which preceded the arrest, removal from office and conviction on corruption charges of former School Board Members Beverly Gallagher and Stephanie Kraft.

The blog format allows online readers to publicly post inside information and diverse opinions. Readers interested in news stories can review original evidence with links to court filings, emails, and videos. In respect to technology, Bob Norman's blog, the Daily Pulp, is not novel compared with competing media which typically have blogs such as the Miami Herald, the South Florida Sun-Sentinel, and the Palm Beach Post. However, for those interested in politics and public corruption, in contrast to other local online media the Daily Pulp is only one click from the home page, and posting is not impeded by a registration process. Ease of blog use and focused community attention to current stories on politics and public corruption enabled Bob Norman's Blog to reach high frequency of public participation for the limited number of subjects covered. For example, in response to columns on Scott Rothstein's Ponzi scheme, readers often submitted 100-200 online postings within the first 24 hours.

According to Alexa, the weekly New Times Broward-Palm Beach's browardpalmbeach.com is ranked 7,917 in web traffic rank in the U.S., compared with newspapers that cover a wider variety of subjects, ranked 797 for the daily Miami Herald's miamiherald.com, 922 for the daily South Florida Sun-Sentinel's sun-sentinel.com, and 1,919 for the Palm Beach Post's pbpost.com

== Exposing Corruption ==
Bob Norman's articles have focused on public corruption, often with early and relentless pursuit of officials who are later arrested and removed from office, for example former Broward County Commissioner Josephus "Joe" Eggelletion and former City of Deerfield Beach Mayor Al Capellini.

Bob Norman has lamented staff downsizing and the weakening of traditional daily newspapers such as the South Florida Sun-Sentinel, the Miami Herald, and the Palm Beach Post, competitors to the New Times. He has offered congratulations to reporters in competing media outlets when they are prompt and accurate, and criticism when they are slow or inaccurate in exposing public corruption.

Bob Norman has criticized the connections between lobbyists and public officials, for example State Attorney Michael J. Satz, elected and reelected since 1976, for slow action in dealing with corrupt Broward County officials who are ultimately brought to justice by Federal investigators, including officials who have received campaign contributions from the same lobbyists as Mr. Satz.

== Books ==
Florida Pulp Nonfiction: True crime in the Sunshine State, 2006

== See also ==
- Jack Anderson (columnist)
