= Rasa von Werder =

German bodybuilder and author (born 1945)

- Born: Rasa Sofija Marija Jakstaite; July 16, 1945; Calw, Germany
- Died: June 5, 2026 (aged 80)
- Other name: Kellie Everts
- Occupations: Bodybuilder, stripper, religious leader, guru, author

Rasa Von Werder (July 16, 1945 – June 5, 2026) (also known as Kellie Everts; born Rasa Sofija Jakštaitė or Jakstas), was a German-born author, former stripper, female bodybuilder, photographer, activist, mystic, contemplative, and spiritual leader.

== Personal life ==
Rasa Von Werder, née Rasa Sofija Jakstaite or Jakstas, was born on July 16, 1945, in Calw, Baden-Württemberg, Germany. She is of Lithuanian, Russian and Mongolian descent. Her parents, Stasys and Regina Jakstas, had fled from Lithuania (then part of the Soviet Union) under Stalin. They briefly lived in a displaced persons camp before travelling to the USA aboard naval ship USS Heintzelman.

Von Werder's family settled in a Lithuanian community in Newark, New Jersey, where her father helped to found a Lithuanian school.

At sixteen she moved (with one of Marilyn Monroe's photographers) to Hollywood, California, where she began a career in show business. She married Stanley Everts in 1963 and had a daughter named Kellie. Stanley Everts died in 1966.

After ten years of living in California, she returned to the Williamsburg neighborhood of Brooklyn, New York, where she spent 17 years. She started a successful business and acquired $200,000 in savings, which she used to buy a house in Upstate New York, where she lived for the rest of her life.

She married Richard Allan Von Werder in 2000 after being engaged since 1986, and they remained married until his 2002 death. During her engagement and marriage, Rasa/Kellie maintained her celibacy, as their relationship was platonic, which Richard Von Werder understood was for the sake of God.

She then lived out the remainder of her life in the greater Binghamton, New York area, until she passed away in her home on June 5, 2026, at the age of 80.

== Career ==
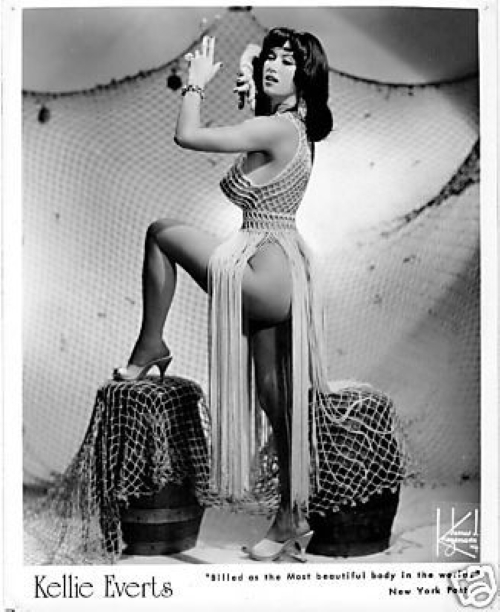
Kellie Everts, Melody Burlesque Theater, New York City, 1978

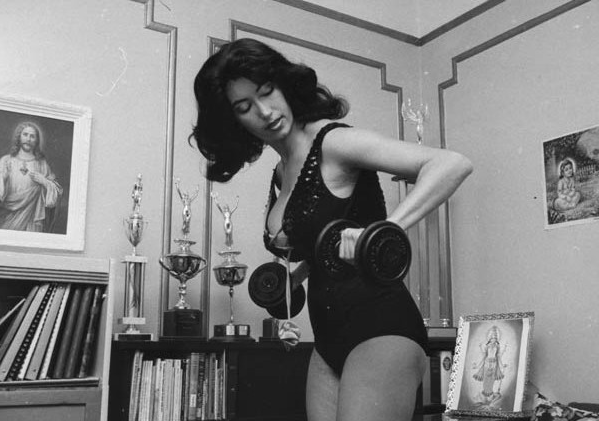
In 1979 Kellie Everts was the first female body building on national TV Show Real People - behind her some of her IFBB Miss Americana and WBBG Miss Body Beautiful trophies

=== Female bodybuilding and strip dancing ===
Everts helped popularise female bodybuilding. She began competing in beauty/fitness contests in New York City in 1972. Due to her work, which included a six-page layout in Esquire magazine in July 1975, television appearances on To Tell the Truth, The Mike Douglas Show and The Stanley Siegel Show, and inaugurating female bodybuilding in the May 1977 of Playboy magazine, serious female fitness and bodybuilding contests got started - the first of which occurred six months after her Playboy spread, "Humping Iron". She had apparently presented the article to Playboy many months before they used it, and they were uncertain if the idea of female body building would be acceptable. But when the film Pumping Iron came out, they parodied it. Kellie then asked Jean-Paul Goude to produce it and present it to Playboy - as he had done with his successful "Muscle and Grit - Religion and Tit - That's What Kellie Everts is Made of" article in Esquire - the first such appearance worldwide. To them it was a lark, tongue in cheek, but the public was apparently mesmerized and great attention was given it. Many interviews and TV shows thus followed, including a tour in Washington, D.C. When the furor had died down by 1976, Kellie had then suggested to Goude that they should do the same subject for Playboy. He predicted that Playboy would reject it, and suggested instead Oui magazine, but Kellie insisted on Playboy. Playboy had agreed to pay half and, in case they used it, the other half, and there it was in May 1977. Six months later, in November 1977, the first muscle contest for women was held. Henry McGhee of the Canton, Ohio YMCA could have seen the Playboy article stating "To the Barbells, Girls!" and held a serious muscle contest for women. Then they began; female bodybuilding shows here and there - some not so big, got bigger when the IFBB associates staged them. There was the IFBB Miss Fitness 1979, IFBB Ms. Olympia 1980. More shows followed and they were promoted in the Joe Weider publications, and hundreds, later thousands, of women began to train and compete. Kellie Everts elaborated on this in one of her many books, The Origin & Decline of Female Body Building (2011), and also in a 2019 interview with David Robson.

Everts had also apparently modeled for famed photographers Irving Penn and Helmut Newton as well. The first for Vogue magazine, 1980, featured her arm flexing a bicep pose, which was used in Vogue and the New York Times advertising the article. Helmut Newton photographed her in a layout for Oui, doing exercises in a white bikini and a white mink coat, but the article was not used because a male model in the spread - Jimmy the Greek - threatened to sue. He apparently said "the guys won't like it - you don't know these guys" and he threatened to punch Helmut Newton out.

Despite having been the catalyst for female bodybuilding and training hard for the event, she was barred from entering the 1981 Caesars Palace Boardwalk Regency IFBB in Atlantic City, apparently due to her controversial "Stripping for God" around that time. She had called the lady who was put in charge by phone to ask admittance to the contest, but the latter apparently rambled about other women and did not invite her, no reason given (likely instructions from the IFBB). However, by then, Everts had already accomplished her goal, which was changing the Overton Window for female body building. Encyclopædia Britannica names Abye "Pudgy" Stockton of the 1940s-1950s as the first female body builder, but she did not change the Overton Window. That is, she did not appear in national/international venues for the sport; she thus remained in the "underground". Universal female muscle shows did not follow her lead. No established bodybuilding organization except the WBBG has awarded any female body builder the title of 'first' except that which was bestowed on Everts.

Everts won the titles of Miss Nude Universe in July 1967, by strutting and bouncing around totally nude in front of a totally nude audience, Miss Americana 2nd place and Best Body in 1972 (on the same stage as Arnold Schwarzenegger), Miss Body Beautiful 2nd place in 1973, first place Miss Body Beautiful U.S.A. in 1974, and Miss Americana 2nd place & Best Body 1974 (the same stage as Arnold Schwarzenegger again). At the end of this show all the male winners posed on an elevated platform - Kellie had two trophies - Second place Miss Americana and Miss Americana Best Body so she felt she deserved to be there. She hopped onto the platform and posed with Arnold, but he maneuvered and moved closer and closer to her until she had to hop off the stage.

She had made nine appearances in Playboy, and was the first female bodybuilder to do so, in the "Humping Iron" edition, May 1977 (predating Lisa Lyon's appearance by three years). Later, she appeared in a three-page spread titled "Stripping for God". Previous to these, she had a six-page spread for the 'Miss Nude Universe Contest' as the winner, in February 1968. She also predated body builder Laura Combes, 1979, when she lifted weights on the Real People show. Maria Shriver produced the documentary on Kellie Everts in 1979 where she Stripped for God (preached and danced) at Harlow's Club in New York City and lifted weights at the Mid City Gym. Local TV shows where she presented female body building were AM New York, AM Washington, and the Stanley Seigel Show - prior to all other female body builders, the dates were 1975 to 1980.

In 1979 Maria Shriver, the future wife of Arnold Schwarzenegger, produced a nine-minute documentary on Kellie Everts, which featured her praying in a church, training in a gym, and preaching/strip teasing at a club. It was the most popular presentation of that month at the station in Baltimore, Maryland.

Of Everts' many books, there are three (all noted in the Bibliography section) that cover her bodybuilding days. They are:

1) The Man Whisperer (2024 page 110 with rare photos) – which gives a time table of her career. 2) I Strip for God part 9 – The Life in my Men (2022 page 124). It documents the relationships of Kellie Everts which were Mr. Universe, Mr. Americas: Mickey Hargitay, Vern Weaver, Harold Poole, Franco Columbu, Arnold Schwarzenegger, Dennis Tinerino, Boyer Coe, Chris Dickerson and Reg Lewis. 3) The Origin and Decline of Female Body Building (2009)

The latter book explains how the genre of female bodybuilding, from that time when it did not exist, how it got started, flourished, and began to decline after the year 2000, when men got frightened by Kim Chizevsky and changed the rules. Then when Weider sold out to AMI in 2003 it was relegated to a subculture.

Everts' dancing career went national from March 1966 to August 1987 and also included numerous shows in Canada. She quit to focus on producing dancing and female domination videos. She made enough money to purchase a 50-acre property in Upstate New York - a watery wilderness with a wide expanse of riverfront and a five-acre island with thirty trees she named "The Island of Mirth".

On February 2, 2007, the World Bodybuilding Guild (WBBG) named her "Progenitor" of Female Bodybuilding - "the Woman responsible for Modern Competitive Female Body Building" and, in August 2007, inducted her into their Hall of Fame.

==== Dan Lurie and Everts – the beginning ====
(From Dan Lurie's Book Heart of Steel Dan Lurie with Dave Robson, Author House 2009 – Page 313): "A young lady with a great physique, Kellie was as motivated to compete as any male bodybuilder I had worked with. I would promote her to the world and in doing this become the first publisher to profile a female bodybuilder."

"In 1974, I received a call from Esquire magazine photographer Jean-Paul Goude, asking me who I would recommend as a subject for an ‘Amazonian’ spread he was planning. I instantly told him, “Kellie Everts is your lady.” In my mind she was the only female bodybuilder around at the time. In fact she was the first real female bodybuilder ever, a fact not lost on me when I put her in my December 1974 MTI. That was the very first article any muscle magazine had done on a female bodybuilding up until then."

"To my mind, one thing is for sure: she was the first female to break through to make women's bodybuilding widely known to mainstream audiences."

=== Ministry ===
In September 1973, Everts gave her first religious talk after dancing at the Melody Theater in Times Square. This combination act of stripping and preaching led the press to dub her the "Stripper for God".

Everts traveled in the United States and Canada, giving over 1,000 sermons in burlesque theaters and nightclubs. "Stripping for God" created public debate about the coexistence of sexuality and spirituality, and conflicted with prevailing social norms and constructs at the time. The assertion of being an ordained minister while openly working in the adult entertainment industry was controversial.

In 1988 she appeared on The Morton Downey Jr. Show on an episode about strippers She filed a lawsuit against host Morton Downey Jr. and the television network WWOR-TV alleging libel.

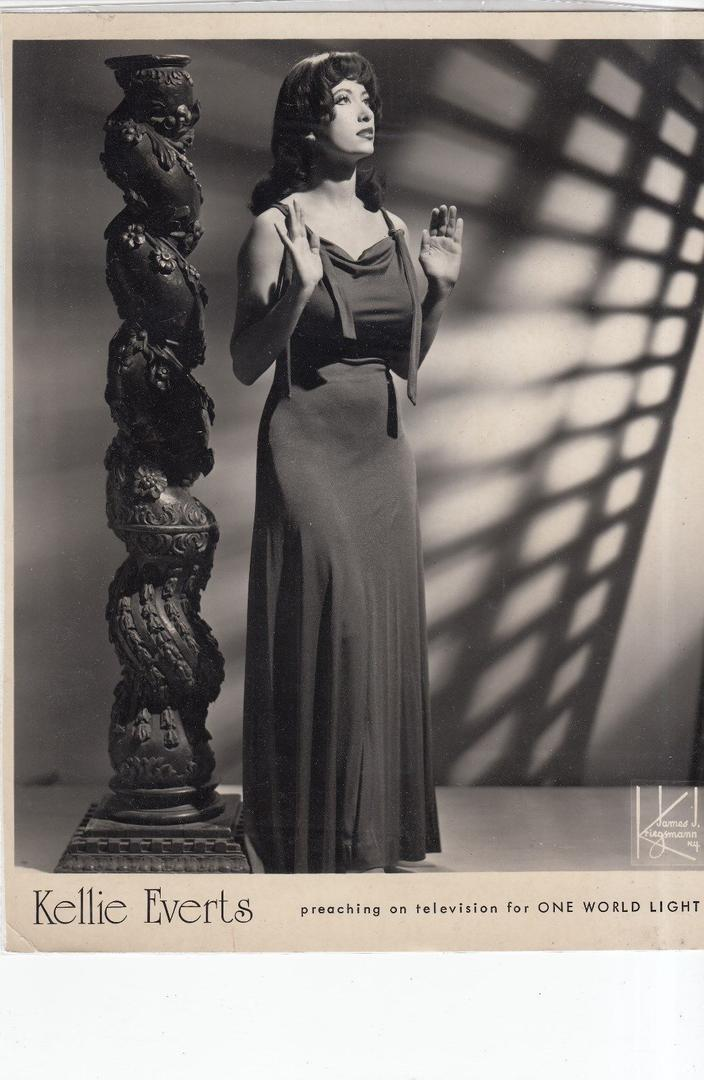
Kellie Everts, 1978 publicity photo by James J. Kriegsmann (1909-1994) preaching for One World Light

Everts later changed the emphasis of her mission to the return of matriarchy and the feminine divine. On June 16, 1978, she preached a message about Our Lady of Fátima in front of the White House in Washington, D.C., intending to bring about the conversion of Russia and, by extension, preventing a potential nuclear World War III. The gist of the message was, "Pray the Rosary for the conversion of Russia, or nations will be annihilated." Everts' acquaintance at the time, Betty Jane Allsup (better known as Honeysuckle Divine) who had first seen her on television, played a crucial role, and had arranged for the press conference and who initially applied for the permit for the event before Everts had even arrived in Washington. The event was documented by the Associated Press, and widely covered in the Washington Post, The Washington Star, Playboy Magazine, and elsewhere. She subsequently expanded her focus, founding "The University of Mother God Church", which became a distinct religion for women.

Rasa Von Werder was a minister to purgatory for many years as well. She said that Jesus Christ appeared to her in the form of a priest (i.e. his Spirit possessed the priest) in a church, where he called her behind the altar (there were no other people present), thereby ordaining her. This enabled Rasa to say the Holy Mass, which she celebrated daily for the Poor Souls, and this was the main way she helped them. Her experiences are outlined in three books: Theater of Justice - Celebrity Souls Appear, God Waits for Them, and Royals Ascend into Heaven.

Everts also did much unrelated activism, humanitarian and community work, primarily in Brooklyn, New York.

=== Author ===
On May 24, 2004, Everts, under her present name Rasa Von Werder or Guru Rasa of the Church of Mother God, started the Woman Thou Art God Website. She subsequently continued publishing online on her religious beliefs. She had 38 books published on female empowerment, her biography, matriarchy spirituality, and various other subjects. Since 2014, Rasa also had another main website, Embodiment of God, that further built on the first one.

She also collaborated with other authors as well in writing books and online articles, most notably including William Bond, who is also featured on that site.

=== Later years ===
In her later years, after 30 years of celibacy for spiritual purposes, beginning at age 63 in 2008 (according to her, God told her to stop suffering, quit celibacy and have fun – thus it was "the Will of God"), von Werder became a "cougar" and photographer of males, mainly in the college town of Binghamton, New York, to further the cause of female empowerment. At Binghamton University, she was popular overall and featured several times on the front page of their student newspaper, Pipe Dream. She has written about this experience in several of her books (see bibliography section).

Von Werder also expanded upon her new matriarchal religion for women, writing the book Woman, Thou Art God: The New Religion for Women in 2019–2020. She published several other books, including working on further volumes in her autobiographical I Strip For God book series and books containing all the guidelines, directions, doctrine, and suggestions for her Sisterhood and "New Religion for Women" that she founded.. Her final, completed full-length book was published in late 2025, and she had continued writing online articles into 2026 as well.

After she passed away on June 5, 2026, Binghamton University Pipe Dream continued to write about her.

== Filmography ==
=== Film ===
- She Did It His Way (1968)
- The Girls on F Street (1967)
- Dude Ranch (1966–1968)
- The Swinger (1966)

=== Television ===
- England documentary on people starting their own YouTube videos, and her dancing (2008)
- The Morton Downey Jr. Show (1988)
- National: Entertainment Tonight regarding The Morton Downey Jr. Show (1988)
- People Are Talking (1988, multiple times)
- The Sally Jessy Rafael Show (1988)
- Various international documentaries, including 60 Minutes Australia (1988) – and also appeared on shows & documentaries in Italy
- Geraldo (1987)
- Phil Donahue (1987)
- Regis Philbin & Kathie Lee (1986)
- San Francisco News (1984)
- Detroit TV (WXYZ Detroit) (1982)
- Tom Snyder (twice) – 1976 & 1981 – 1976 as ‘Stripper for God', and 1981 as Body Builder with Lisa Lyon, where Rasa spoke & posed in a white bikini
- To Tell the Truth (twice) – once as impersonating the "World's Yo-Yo Champion" and second, as herself, a minister and body builder doing some bench presses at the end (1978)
- Chicago: Warren Saunders' Common Ground (1978)
- Chicago – Ron Hunter Show (1978)
- AM Chicago (1978)
- Chicago – Friday Night Live with Jay Levene (1978)
- AM Washington (twice, 1974 and 1978)
- Inside Edition (Florida) (1978)
- The Bill Boggs Show (1976)
- Real People (5 times total) for all that she did – Stripper for God, Body Builder (1975–1981)
- Mike Douglas (1975)
- AM New York (many times, including once with Arnold Schwarzenegger) (1974)
- And various other TV news shows (many coast to coast in the US as well as in Canada) from 1972 to 2017 for her various activities, Stripping for God, Body Building, getting arrested in Ohio and Toronto, and her new church

=== Other video appearances ===
- Guru Rasa Von Werder: New Religion 4 Women, aka The Religion of Sex: Woman Thou Art God (channel formerly titled "Kellie Everts 48-28-38 Conducts Night Train"), various videos on YouTube (2018–2025)
- Army of Mother God, by Female Supremacy NOW, on YouTube (2015)

== In popular culture ==
As a result of her influence, von Werder made appearances in numerous forms of magazine prints, including The New York Post (1974), D-Cup (1989), The Examiner, and The Sun (1998), and was frequently portrayed in Playboy.

== Bibliography ==
- The Religion of Sex: The Kill Switch to Patriarchy (featuring William Bond and Pete Jackson) (2025)
- Royals Ascend Into Heaven: H.M. Queen Elizabeth II, Prince Philip, Lady Diana, Princess Margaret (2025)
- The Man Whisperer: How an Old Lady Snags Young Men for Sex (featuring William Bond and Pete Jackson) (2024)
- Can Female Power Save The Planet? Part 2, Women's Sexual Freedom (featuring William Bond, Pete Jackson, et al.) (2024)
- God Waits for Them: The Souls in Purgatory (featuring William Bond, et al.) (2024)
- I Strip for God, Part 10: Women's Sexual Freedom & Cougering (2023)
- I Strip for God, Part 9: The Life in my Men (2022)
- I Strip for God, Part 8: He Died to be with Me (2022)
- I Strip for God, Part 7: The Sisterhood (2022)
- I Strip for God, Part 6: Stars in my Eyes (2022)
- I Strip for God, Part 5: The Enigma - She Bared More Than Her Soul (2021)
- I Strip for God, Part 4: Woman with a Mission (2021)
- I Strip for God, Part 3: Early Life (2021)
- I Strip for God, Part 2: Life of Kellie Everts aka Rasa Von Werder (2021)
- Woman, Thou Art God: The New Religion for Women (2020)
- America's Most Beautiful Men (2019)
- Old Woman, Young Man: Why They Belong Together, Part II (2019)
- America's Most Beautiful Man (2016)
- Old Woman, Young Man: Why They Belong Together, Part I (2011)
- Theater of the Mind: Dreams, Symbols, & Meanings (2011)
- Guru Rasa and her Devotees (2011 and 2009)
- Secrets of Yoga and Christianity: Are They Compatible? (2011 and 2006)
- The Beatific Vision: Seeing God Face to Face (2011 and 2009)
- Theater of Justice: Celebrity Souls Appear (2011 and 2007)
- The Future of Male-Female Relationships (2011 and 2009)
- On the Attainment of the Divine Stigmata (2011)
- Worship of Beautiful Women Is Hunger for Mother God (2011 and 2009)
- Breastfeeding Is Lovemaking Between Mother and Child (2011)
- The Origin and Decline of Female Body Building (2009)
- I Strip for God, Part 1 (2009)
- It's Not Over Till the Fat Lady Sings: Mother God Strikes Back Against Misogyny (featuring William Bond, et al.) (2006 and 2007)
- Can Female Power Save the Planet? The Fate of the World Depends on Women (2006)

== See also ==
- Female empowerment
- Female bodybuilding
- Feminist spirituality
- Feminist theology
- Goddess movement
- Honeysuckle Divine
- Dan Lurie
- Matriarchy
- Matriarchal religion
- William Bond
- Three Secrets of Fatima
- Thealogy
