= William Bond (author) =

British author

- Born: May 7, 1946 (age 80); London, England
- Occupation: Author
- Writing career
- Period: 20th and 21st century
- Genres: Spirituality, Religion

William Bond is an English author. He was born in London, England in 1946. When he was four years old, his parents immigrated to Australia and lived in the state of Western Australia. In 1970, he returned to England, and has lived there ever since.

He has been writing since the late 1980s, and has written numerous published books, blog articles, and YouTube videos about several diverse topics, including philosophy, politics, economics, diet and nutrition, and even mermaids. But he is most well known for his writings on the topic of matriarchy along with matriarchal religion and spirituality, for which he is a strong advocate. His early inspirations in that regard included authors Elizabeth Gould Davis, Merlin Stone, and Marija Gimbutas since the 1970s.

William has been known to collaborate with fellow matriarchist author Rasa Von Werder (also known as Kellie Everts) since 2004 and right up until her passing in 2026. He has also collaborated with author Pamela Suffield as well to a lesser extent since his first published book (with Suffield as co-author) in 1994, Gospel of the Goddess: A Return to God the Mother, which they began writing in the late 1980s and self-published it in the early 1990s.

Most of his work to date is non-fiction, though he has also written several fictional novels as well, particularly in more recent years.

== Bibliography ==
- That Girl from the Malevolent Realm (2026)
- Mother God Hypothesis (2026)
- Why God Is A Woman (2024)
- Sisterhood-Sex-Dominance (as Fred Finley) (2024)
- The Hidden History of Mermaids (2024)
- Evolution (2024)
- Ravensaur: Dinosaur Resurrection (2024)
- 2084 (as Fred Finley) (2023)
- Femdom Christianity: Worshipping the Divine Female (2023)
- Femdom Witchcraft: The Female Goddess as Benign AND Malign (2023)
- Why Men Are The Submissive Sex (2022)
- The Origins of the Mermaid Myth (with Pamela Suffield) (2012)
- The Aquatic Ape Mystery (2012)
- Why Women Can Do a Better Job of Ruling the World than Men (2012)
- Sexual Evolution (2010 and 2011)
- Why Men Are the Submissive Sex (2009 and 2011)
- Femdom and Brainwashing Techniques (2008 and 2011)
- Femdom Witchcraft (2008 and 2011)
- Why Women Should Rule the World (2008 and 2011)
- Freemasonry and the Hidden Goddess (2008 and 2011)
- Mermaids, Witches, and Amazons (2007 and 2008)
- Naked Isis (2005)
- Make Love, Not War (2004)
- Gospel of the Goddess: A Return to God the Mother (co-written with Pamela Suffield) (1994) (re-released 2008 and 2011)

Also featured in:

- The Religion of Sex: The Kill Switch to Patriarchy, by Rasa Von Werder (2025)
- The Man Whisperer: How an Old Lady Snags Young Men for Sex, by Rasa Von Werder (2024)
- Can Female Power Save The Planet? Part 2, Women's Sexual Freedom, by Rasa Von Werder (2024)
- God Waits for Them: The Souls in Purgatory, by Rasa Von Werder (2024)
- Woman, Thou Art God: The New Religion for Women, by Rasa Von Werder (2020)
- It's Not Over Till The Fat Lady Sings: Mother God Strikes Back Against Misogyny, by Rasa Von Werder (2007)

== See also ==
- Matriarchy
- Matriarchal religion
- Mermaid
- Goddess Movement
- Feminist spirituality
- Rasa von Werder
- Thealogy
