= Al Goldstein =

American pornographer (1936–2013)

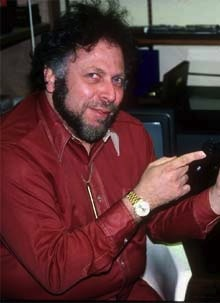
- Born: Alvin Goldstein; January 10, 1936; New York City, U.S.
- Died: December 19, 2013 (aged 77); New York City, U.S.
- Occupation: Publisher
- Spouses: Lonnie Leavitt (m. 1963; div. 1965); Mary Phillips (m. 1968; div. 1977); Gena Goldstein (m. 1978; div. 1991); Patricia Flaherty (m. 1994; div. 1999); Christina Ava Maharaj (m. 2004; div. 2006)
- Children: Jordan Goldstein

Alvin Goldstein (January 10, 1936 – December 19, 2013) was an American pornographer best known for publishing the sex newspaper Screw and normalizing hardcore pornography in the United States.

== Background ==
Goldstein was born in Williamsburg, Brooklyn to a Jewish family, one of two sons of newspaper photographer Sam Goldstein and his wife Gertrude Goldstein. He attended Boys High. He captained the debate team at Pace College and interviewed Allen Ginsberg for the college newspaper. He served in the Army in the Signal Corps as a photographer. He worked as a photojournalist, taking pictures of Jacqueline Kennedy on a 1962 state trip to Pakistan and spent several days in a Cuban jail for taking unauthorized photos of Fidel Castro's brother, Raúl. He also sold insurance, wrote freelance articles, ran a dime pitch game at the 1964-65 New York World's Fair, sold encyclopedias, rugs and his own blood, drove a taxi (he kept his taxi license active until his death), and landed a job as an industrial spy infiltrating a labor union, an experience that so appalled him he wrote an exposé about it for the radical newspaper New York Free Press, a weekly periodical.

== Career ==
=== Print publications ===
==== Screw ====
In November 1968, Goldstein and his partner Jim Buckley, investing $175 each (equivalent to $1,620 today), founded Screw, a weekly New York City tabloid. It featured reviews of porn movies, peep shows, erotic massage parlors, brothels, escorts and other local offerings of the adult entertainment industry. Such items were interspersed with news concerning sexual topics, critical reviews of sexual books, and hardcore "gynecological" pictorials. Goldstein regularly ran, without permission, photos and drawings of celebrities.

"Screw grew from a combination of many factors, chief of which was my own dissatisfaction with the sex literature of 1968 and my yearning for a publication that reflected my sexual appetites," Goldstein wrote. "I may be making a lot of money, but I really believe I'm doing some good by demythologizing a lot about sexuality", he said in a Playboy Interview. It was described as "raunchy, obnoxious, usually disgusting and sometimes political." The initial price was 25¢. At its peak, Screw sold 140,000 copies weekly.

Arrested 19 times on obscenity charges, he spent millions of dollars on First Amendment lawsuits, ultimately scoring a major victory when a federal judge dismissed an obscenity case in 1974. (Goldstein believed that the case began as a result of Screw's article, "Is J. Edgar Hoover a Fag?", the first published comment on Hoover's sexuality.) Venue-shopping prosecutors selected conservative Wichita, Kansas, to prosecute Goldstein for obscenity; when he was found not guilty, he flew the jury to New York to attend a party at the swing club Plato's Retreat. His long-term attorney was Herald Price Fahringer, a prominent criminal defense and First Amendment lawyer .

According to Will Sloan, "Goldstein was the first journalist to seriously review porn films. Had he not written a rave review of a low-budget film called Deep Throat ('I was never so moved by any theatrical performance since stuttering through my own bar mitzvah'), it would never have become a hit at New York's World Theater, would never have been targeted by the vice squad, would never have spawned a First Amendment cause célèbre, and might not have led to the modern porn industry."

==== Bitch magazine ====
In the March 11, 1974 issue of Screw, Goldstein ran an ad seeking subscribers to a new magazine, Bitch, which "brings women's sexuality out of the closet for the first time" and also "takes women out of politics and puts them back on their back where they belong." (Note: there have been several other magazines also called Bitch.) The first issue "contain[ed] an explosive symposium about blowjobs by four women who talk about giving head and what they like and don't like about it". Also included in the premiere issue was an interview with actor James Caan, and a centerfold of a man shot by a female photographer.

==== Smut Magazine ====
In the same March 11, 1974 issue of Screw, Goldstein also ran an ad seeking subscribers to Smut, a magazine "so filthy that not only do you have to wash after every page, but every reader must disinfect after reading! SMUT is so dirty, so scummy, that once you have it on your hands you can't get it off!" The magazine offered pornography in images and words, without the news articles found in Screw.

==== National Screw ====
In 1976-1977 National Screw was published; the place of publication was given as Secaucus, New Jersey. The June 1977 issue of the magazine contained, according to its cover, a new story by William Burroughs and an interview with Allen Ginsberg. It is known to have published at least nine issues (76–77), also containing original adult comic strip work from comic artist legends Wally Wood and Will Eisner.

==== Death magazine ====
In 1979, Goldstein began Death magazine. It lasted four issues. The February, 1980 issue had a picture of Elvis Presley on the cover, "Grim Reaper Awards", "Eulogy to a War Lover", "Death by Hanging", "Femme Fatales", and other articles.

==== Screw West ====
In 1979-1980 Goldstein's company, Milky Way Productions, published Screw West out of an office in Hollywood, California. According to an advertisement, it was intended to answer such questions as, "Where can I get laid in San Francisco? What's the best swinger's club in Los Angeles? How do I find all those out-of-the-way Pacific Coast nude beaches? And what are those bawdy brothels outside Las Vegas really like?" It is known to have published 54 issues.

=== Movies and television ===
==== It Happened in Hollywood ====
In 1973, "Screw Magazine present[ed]" It Happened in Hollywood, a pornographic movie, produced by Goldstein's partner Jim Buckley. Goldstein played a character in the movie, and is also credited as "fourth unit director." At the 2nd Annual New York Erotic Film Festival it won awards for Best Picture, Best Female Performance, and Best Supporting Actor.

==== Midnight Blue ====
In 1974 Goldstein began Screw Magazine of the Air, soon renamed Midnight Blue, a thrice weekly hour-long adult-oriented public access television program that ran for nearly 30 years on Manhattan Cable Television's Channel J; federal regulations regarding public access to cable TV systems made it impossible for the cable system to refuse his program. (Similarly, Goldstein used a legal prohibition on the censorship of political advertisements to force television broadcast of pornography, under a transparent, but legal, veil of "political candidacy".) In it, he regularly interviewed porn stars, other adult industry figures, and sympathetic celebrities and "freaks", and ran advertisements for brothels, phone sex services, and Sammy's Roumanian Steakhouse.

In the later years, after departure of original director Alex Bennett, Goldstein featured on each program a "Fuck You" segment, a few minutes in which he viciously attacked celebrities, politicians, the judge who presided over his latest trial, the New York County District Attorney, businesses he felt had wronged him and, after their estrangement, his own son.

"In its early years, Midnight Blue captured porn star Georgina Spelvin doing her nude tap-dance act at the Melody Burlesque; Tara Alexander attempting the world's biggest gang bang at Plato's Retreat, the New York swing club; the 10th anniversary Screw party, where Buck Henry and Melvin Van Peebles hobnob with Goldstein's jurors; and an early look at the S&M community in New York. Throughout its run, Midnight Blue interviewed almost every major porn star, and regularly tested the limits of what was acceptable for cable television." Seven volumes of excerpts from the show have been issued on DVD.

==== SOS: Screw on the Screen ====
In 1975, Goldstein issued SOS: Screw on the Screen, a stridently unsexy attempt at a cinematic newsmagazine that included a lot of goofy comedy, a gay scene, and several minutes of Goldstein ranting about America's sexual hypocrisy. Also appearing was Honeysuckle Divine (who often appeared in SCREW). A poster of her was on sale in the same issue. Honeysuckle Divine was a Times Square stripper whose specialty was inserting objects such as pickles in her vagina, shooting out many of them. She put the pickles in baggies and sold them to patrons. Goldstein said that her act "was unbelievably disgusting, so naturally, we made her our symbol."

=== Other business ventures ===
==== The Screw Store ====
In the May 17, 1976, issue of Screw Goldstein ran an ad for the "Screw Store", which offered dildos, including a "Bicentennial Dildo", vibrating Ben wa eggs, and a vibrating cock ring. Selling dildos brought one of Goldstein's many arrests.

==== Al Goldstein's Cinema ====
The October 17, 1977, issue of Screw contained an advertisement for "Al Goldstein's Cinema", located at 8th Avenue and 46th Street near Times Square. Admission was 99¢. In the same issue, in the movie listings, it is described as "a large, comfortable porn house which shows average hardcore features. Some of these are first-run features, some have already played theaters in the city." The theater is not found in a listing of porn theaters from 1979.

==== Rabbit Ranch ====
In 2001, on Saint Martin, an island in the Lesser Antilles, Goldstein planned to open the Rabbit Ranch, the first of what he hoped would be a chain of 10 to 30 bordellos that would flourish wherever prostitution is legal. He intended to use the profits to finance his second run for sheriff. The brothel never opened; authorities refused to give him a license because he was not a citizen of that nation. "We didn't bribe the right people or something," he said.

== Personal life ==
=== Family ===
Goldstein married five times and had a son, Jordan Ari Goldstein, with his third wife, Gina. According to Goldstein, he and Jordan had a close relationship until the Goldsteins' divorce. They became estranged after Al called Gina "a contemptible vagina".

=== Friendship with Larry Flynt ===
One of Goldstein's best friends was Larry Flynt. Goldstein said that Flynt's Hustler magazine, founded seven years after Screw, stole the Hustler format from Screw, but that he was not angry. According to Goldstein, Flynt succeeded in creating a national publication, at which he had failed.

=== Life in Florida ===
While mostly associated with the city of New York, Goldstein was also a well-known figure in Broward County, Florida, making the cover of a local alternative tabloid, New Times. He owned a 10,000-square-foot mansion in Pompano Beach, famous for its statue, 11 feet (3.4 m) high, of a raised middle finger on the back lawn, visible to boaters on the Intracoastal Waterway.

In 1992, he filed to run for sheriff against Nick Navarro, who had gained Goldstein's enmity by arresting on obscenity charges 2 Live Crew members and a record dealer who sold their album As Nasty As They Wanna Be. (The accused were convicted, but won on appeal.) Goldstein withdrew before the election took place. In 2001 he spoke publicly of his intent to run a second time, against Ken Jenne, on a platform of "leaving folks the hell alone". He never filed, saying that he could not afford the campaign.

== Political and religious views ==
Goldstein was a delegate to the Libertarian Party's 1992 presidential nominating convention, which William F. Buckley Jr. found a sign of the Party's downfall.

=== Views on religion ===
Goldstein was an atheist, referring to himself as such in an interview in the Winter 1997 issue of Davka, an avant-garde Jewish cultural magazine. He was opposed to all forms of organized religion.

=== Views on the Iranian regime ===
In April 1989, he ran a full-page ad in Screw offering $1 million for the assassination of the Ayatollah Khomeini, in response to Khomeini's February 1989 fatwa against novelist Salman Rushdie for allegedly blaspheming Islam. According to Goldstein, he received 16 death threats against himself the day after he ran the ad. (Khomeini died of natural causes in June 1989.)

== Final years ==
=== Legal issues and financial woes ===
In 2002, Goldstein was found guilty of harassing a former employee, having published her telephone number and place of employment in Screw and encouraging readers to call her and tell her "to stop being such a cunt." Goldstein was sentenced to 60 days in jail. He served six days before the charges were overturned on appeal. Goldstein apologized as part of a plea bargain. Unable to make payroll, Screw folded in 2003; only 600 copies were sold of the final issue. Goldstein's company, Milky Way Productions, which published Screw and Midnight Blue, entered bankruptcy in 2004, having lost sales and subscribers as a result of the proliferation of internet pornography, abetted by Goldstein's financial mismanagement.

Goldstein lost his Florida mansion and his townhouse on Manhattan's Upper East Side. Jobless and penniless, he ended up living briefly in a Manhattan homeless shelter. He was fired from New York's well-known Second Avenue Deli for sleeping in the basement, after a brief stint there as a greeter.

Goldstein was arrested for shoplifting four health-related books from Barnes & Noble. He worked in 2005 as a commissioned salesman for New York City Bagels. Between 2005 and 2008, he blogged for booble.com, a pornographic search engine (defunct as of 2023); he then continued on his own website until 2009.

Goldstein was financially supported in his last years by his friend the illusionist Penn Jillette, on whose floor he once slept, and who admired Goldstein for his First Amendment activism. His final residence, prior to a nursing home, was a small apartment in the Far Rockaway neighborhood of Queens, paid for by Jillette.

=== Death ===
Goldstein died on December 19, 2013, aged 77, from renal failure at a nursing home in Cobble Hill, Brooklyn.

== Legacy ==
=== Obituary ===
Goldstein was described in his obituary in The New York Times as "a cartoonishly vituperative amalgam of Borscht Belt comic, free-range social critic and sex-obsessed loser who seemed to embody a moment in New York City's cultural history: the sleaze and decay of Times Square in the 1960s and ‘70s."

=== Documentary ===
In 2003, Lancaster Pictures produced a documentary on Goldstein entitled Goldstein: The Trials of the Sultan of Smut. It focused on his legal troubles. Larry Flynt, Ron Jeremy, and Jimmy Breslin appeared in the movie. He claimed to have had 7,000 sexual partners. Another writer called him "a hairy, sweaty, cigar-chomping, eczema-ridden fatso".

=== Retrospective ===
In his 2011 book Dirty! Dirty! Dirty! – of Playboys, Pigs, and Penthouse Paupers, an American Tale of Sex and Wonder, former Screw writer and editor Mike Edison documents Goldstein's rise and fall against the successes of his peers Larry Flynt of Hustler, Bob Guccione of Penthouse, and Hugh Hefner of Playboy. Edison also lauds Goldstein as a staunch fighter for the First Amendment, quoting Gay Talese, who referred to Goldstein in his book Thy Neighbor's Wife, saying, "We need a free society, and freedom is not won by literary tea parties and well-meaning, virtuous publishers, it is won by disreputable people like Al Goldstein." Edison also quotes the New York reporter Jimmy Breslin as saying, "Al Goldstein is one of four people in the last 35 years who has effectively protected the First Amendment rights of reporters who bring the news to you. The others are Ralph Ginzburg, Larry Flynt, and Lenny Bruce. I know you don’t want to meet them, but you owe them.”

== Filmography ==
Unless otherwise noted, Goldstein appeared as himself in the following movies:

- Dynamite Chicken (1971)
- It Happened in Hollywood (1973)
- Let My Puppets Come (1976)
- Denial (1998)
- Wadd: The Life and Times of John C. Holmes (1998)
- Sex: The Annabel Chong Story (1999)
- Citizen Toxie: The Toxic Avenger IV (2001)
- Porn Star: The Legend of Ron Jeremy (2001)
- Al Goldstein and Ron Jeremy are Screwed (2003) (X-rated)
- Inside Deep Throat (2005)
- Obscene (2007)
- American Swing (2008)
- Filthy Gorgeous: The Bob Guccione Story (2013)
- Back Issues: The Hustler Magazine Story (2014)

== Bibliography ==
- Goldstein, Al; Friedman, Josh Alan (2006). I, Goldstein: My Screwed Life. New York: Thunder's Mouth Press. ISBN 978-1560258681.
- Goldstein, Al; Buckley, Jim, eds. (1971). The Screw Reader. New York: Lyle Stuart. ASIN B0010C5MBE.
