= Big Top (American TV series) =

American children's television program

- Also known as: "Sealtest Big Top"
- Genre: Family Television
- Written by: Ed McMahon
- Starring: Jack Sterling; Dan Lurie; Ed McMahon; Chris Keegan
- Country of origin: United States
- Original language: English

Production
- Running time: 60 minutes
- Production company: WCAU

Original release
- Network: CBS
- Release: 1 July 1950 – 1957

Big Top is a one-hour children's television show that aired on CBS from July 1, 1950, to September 21, 1957. The cast included Ed McMahon, Johnny Carson's future sidekick, as Ed the Clown and America's Most Muscular Man Dan Lurie as "Sealtest Dan The Muscle Man". The program originally aired live from the Camden, New Jersey's first "Convention Hall" on Memorial Avenue at Line Street. When the Convention Hall burned down in June 1953, the show moved and instead aired from the 32nd St. and Lancaster Ave. Philadelphia Armory.

The series debuted on July 1, 1950, and ran at 7:00 p.m. Eastern Time on Saturday until September 1950, when it moved to 6:30 p.m. Eastern on Saturday, where it remained through January 6, 1951. It then moved to Saturday at noon, where it remained for seven more years. It ended its run on September 21, 1957. Music was composed by Milton Kaye.
