= Dan Lurie =

American bodybuilder and entrepreneur

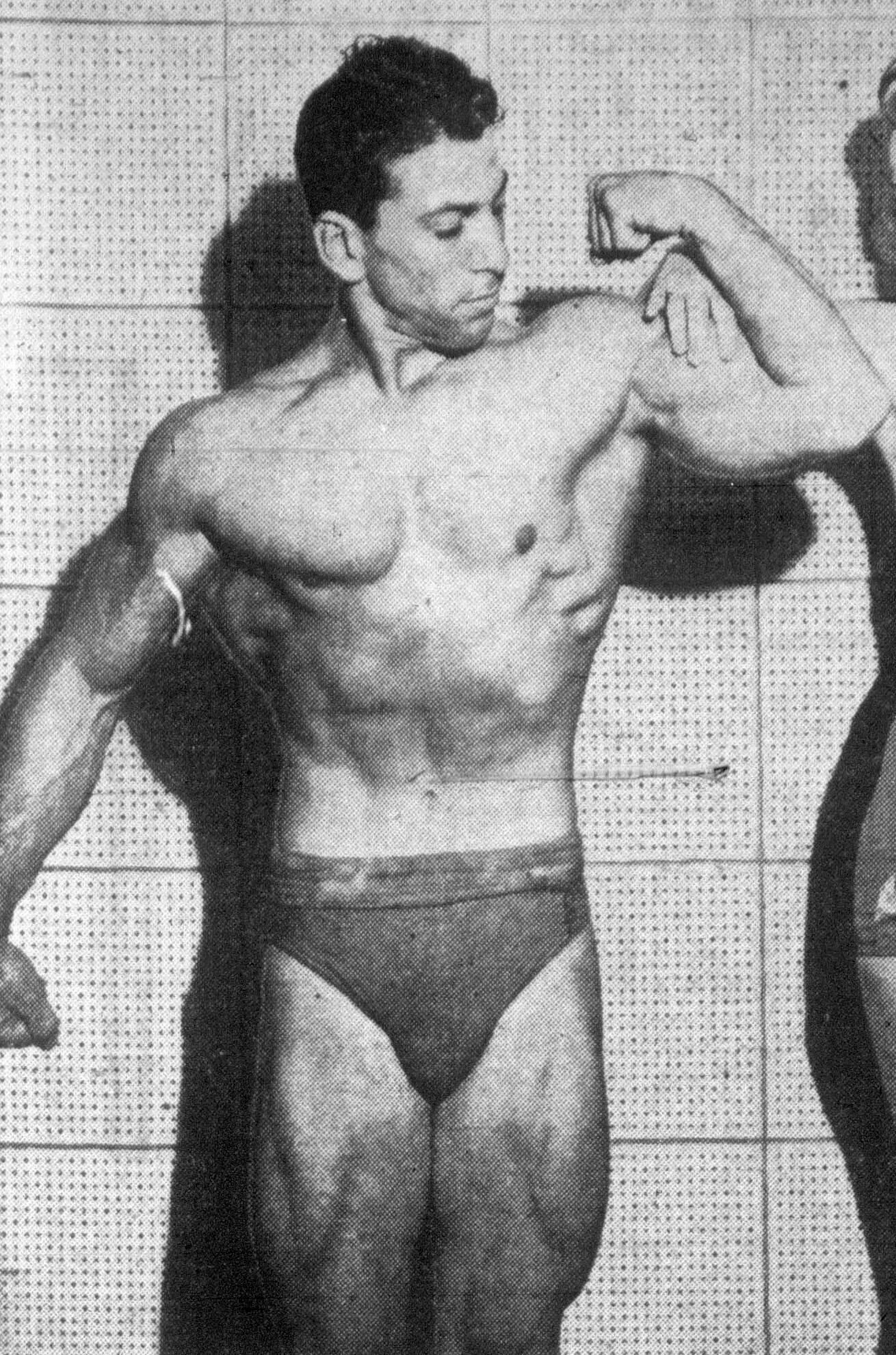
- Born: April 1, 1923; New York, New York, U.S.
- Died: November 6, 2013 (aged 90); Roslyn, New York, U.S.
- Occupations: Bodybuilder, entrepreneur

Dan Lurie (April 1, 1923 – November 6, 2013) was an American bodybuilder, television personality, entrepreneur, and world record holder. He was regarded as a pioneer in physical fitness and a founding father of bodybuilding. Lurie had won the Mr. America title of "America's Most Muscular Man" four times by 1949, and in 1984 made history by arm wrestling U.S. President Ronald Reagan on the Oval Office desk in the White House.

== Biography ==
Lurie was born in New York, New York, graduated from Samuel J. Tilden High School and later moved to North Woodmere on Long Island where he lived until age 90. A world-class bodybuilder in the 1940s, Lurie won numerous titles in the Mr. America competitions. In 1948, he established the International Federation of Body Builders and later went on to create The World Body Building Guild. In the 1950s he went on to star as "Sealtest Dan, The Muscle Man" in a long-running CBS TV series called The Sealtest Big Top.

Throughout his career, Lurie had a rivalry with his former business partner, Joe Weider. As a magazine publisher, bodybuilding trainer and contest promoter, Lurie also had well publicized relationships with Arnold Schwarzenegger and Lou Ferrigno; these relationships ended in litigation; the details of which were controversially detailed in Lurie's 2009 book Heart of Steel, for which Regis Philbin contributed a foreword. Lurie befriended many Hollywood stars such as Mae West, Steve Reeves and Clint Eastwood. In the course of his career in the fitness realm from the 1940s through the year 2000, Lurie owned and operated numerous Dan Lurie Gyms and Health Clubs in New York and Miami Beach that attracted celebrities and bodybuilders alike. Sylvester Stallone famously trained at one of them.

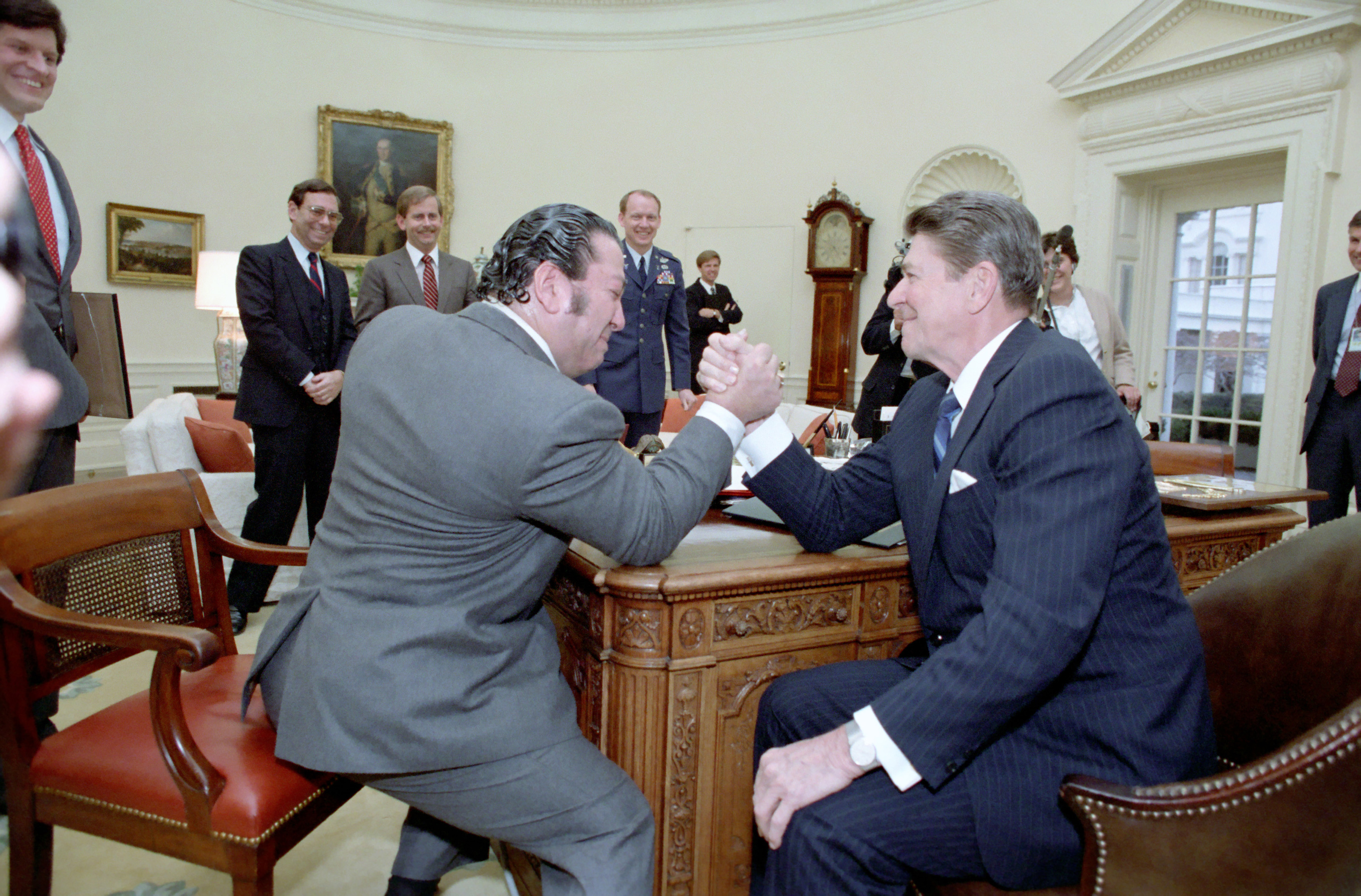
Lurie and Reagan in the Oval Office

Lurie manufactured his own line of weights, exercise equipment and nutritional supplements which he sold via catalog and through the flagship chain of stores he owned and operated in New York called Dan Lurie's Sports World. Additionally, Lurie was known for creating and publishing several international magazinea; titles that included Muscle Training Illustrated, Wrestling Training Illustrated, World Karate, World Champion Boxing and Hot Rock.

He was active well into his 80s when he came out of semi-retirement to promote new bodybuilding events and products. At age 90, he made plans to create and promote bodybuilding shows and travel to schools, universities and conventions to speak out in regard to the dangers of drugs and steroids in sports (as he had done for years before). Lurie was a staunch promoter of clean athletics and natural bodybuilding, and claims to have never used performance enhancement drugs. He was famous for his trademark slogan "Health Is Your Greatest Wealth".

=== Television career ===
Lurie appeared on the Sealtest Big Top Circus Variety Show on CBS. He played "Sealtest Dan, The Muscle Man". Ed McMahon played a clown. Lurie also appeared as "The Mighty Rewop" in the popular children's TV series Captain Video.

=== Hall Of Fame ===
On April 29, 2007, Lurie was inducted into the National Jewish Sports Hall of Fame.

=== Notable Associates ===
Kellie Everts – the Beginning of Competitive Female Body Building

From Lurie's Book “Heart of Steel” with Dave Robson, Author House 2009 – Page 313

Lurie wrote: "Kellie Everts: A young lady with a great physique, Kellie was as motivated to compete as any male bodybuilder I had worked with. I would promote her to the world and in doing this become the first publisher to profile a female bodybuilder."

"In 1974, I received a call from Esquire magazine photographer Jean-Paul Goude, asking me who I would recommend as a subject for an ‘Amazonian’ spread he was planning. I instantly told him, “Kellie Everts is your lady.” In my mind she was the only female bodybuilder around at the time. In fact she was the first real female bodybuilder ever, a fact not lost on me when I put her in my December 1974 MTI. That was the very first article any muscle magazine had done on a female bodybuilding up until then."

"To my mind, one thing is for sure: she was the first female to break through to make women’s bodybuilding widely known to mainstream audiences."

On Feb 2, 2007 the WBBG awarded Kellie Everts the title "Progenitor" - "The Woman who got female competitive body building started" and in August put her into their Hall of Fame - the only female in the WBBG Hall of Fame

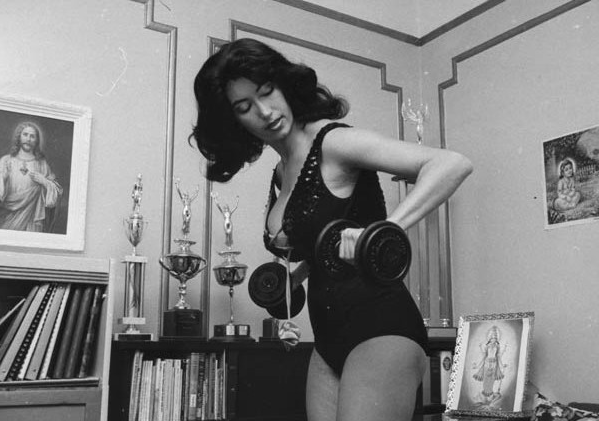
In 1979 Kellie Everts was the first female body building on national TV Show "Real People" - behind her some of her IFBB Miss Americana and WBBG Miss Body Beautiful trophies

== Strength and endurance records ==
- 1225 parallel dips in 90 minutes
- A one-handed overhead bent press with 285 lb bodyweight 168 lb
- Leg press with 1230 lb
- Back lift of 1810 lb
