= Honeysuckle Divine =

American stripper and prostitute

- Born: Betty Jane Allsup; January 21, 1938 (age 88); Rock Island, Illinois, U.S.
- Occupation: Burlesque dancer
- Years active: 1962–1985

Honeysuckle Divine (born Betty Jane Allsup; January 21, 1938) is a retired American stripper, erotic performance artist, and sexual columnist. Her specialty was inserting and ejecting things from her vagina onstage; when she performed at the Concertgebouw in Amsterdam, she was described in the program as "vaginiste", a performer using the vagina. She was often arrested. According to Bruce David, editor of SCREW in the 1970s, then editor of Hustler, she was at one point the best-known stripper in the United States. She is particularly associated with SCREW, for whom she was a sort of mascot. As Al Goldstein said, her act "was unbelievably disgusting, so naturally, we made her our symbol." She was the only female associated with SCREW over any period of time.

== Early years ==
Born in Rock Island, Illinois, Divine was the tenth in a family of fourteen children. She described her father as a "hillbilly, banjo-playing lumberjack." She was a straight-A student until she hit puberty. Religion was not a significant part of her upbringing, but when she reached her teens it started to dominate her every thought. Divine did not drink, smoke, curse or gamble. She would help the elderly and those even poorer than her. She regularly prayed for the sick and the needy. She was a model Christian girl, but she dated boys, and had her heart broken. She became pregnant and had an abortion.

At 21, bored with life in Rock Island, she departed for Philadelphia, where she became a postulant (novice) at the Grey Nuns of the Sacred Heart convent. After three months, unable to "understand the spiritual lessons they tried to teach me," she left the convent, climbing out of a window in the night, and went to the police, who assisted her in returning to Rock Island.

== Working as a stripper ==
Unsuccessful in nursing school, she got a job as a waitress, but soon found out that she could make much more money as a stripper. She moved to Washington, D.C., and performed in burlesque clubs during the 1960s, under the name Pussy Bird. According to a 1975 interview, she left Illinois "armed only with a dress, a douche, and a diary."

Divine danced and prostituted herself in Washington and Baltimore during the 1960s, while keeping her apartment in Washington. According to her diary, her clients included a senator, a governor, two ambassadors to the United Nations, two union leaders, a Pulitzer Prize-winning author, and, she claimed, the president of the United States, Lyndon B. Johnson.

After I had been in Washington a couple of years, I met the President. I had been screwing one of his aides, and this guy told me (about the President). And then I screwed one of his relatives. So the President must have heard about me from these people.

One night (Johnson) came into the striptease club (Fredericks) where I was with some other guys and he bought me a bottle of champagne. He made a date with me, and we went to the Statler Hilton, and then he took me home in a taxi to my apartment.

The night I spent with the President at the Statler Hilton might have blossomed into a more lasting relationship if not for the Viet Nam war. He was a wonderful man who hated the decision he had to make. Fortunately, the times I went to bed with important people in Washington, D.C., it was strictly on a play-for-pay basis, and no mistress-type emotional affairs.

In the late 1960s, Divine also began performing regularly in New York, usually staying at the Edison Hotel, appearing at various emporia of gynecomania such as the Roxy, the Psychedelic Burlesk Theater ("not a popular working spot because the men's room is located backstage and when the girls leave the stage at the end of their acts, guys are usually there waiting to ambush them—I was attacked three times in one day there"), and the Forty-second Street Playhouse ("the last sign of life before a desolate stretch of parking lots leading toward the Hudson River"). She was not a great dancer and she did not have a particularly suggestive stage routine, but it was an era when the clubs were often being busted by cops on the lookout for anything resembling lewd behavior. Around 1970, by accident stumbling on a description of the famous flatulist Le Pétomane, she decided that she could spice up her act. This led to her becoming a headliner across the country. Audiences were wowed by her performances, which included blowing out candles with air forced out of her vagina; shooting ping-pong balls, Jergens lotion, and other items from her vagina; inserting a mop or broom handle in her vagina and using it to pretend-clean the stage; and finally, inserting pickles in her vagina, which she then put in baggies and sold to the audience, or peanut butter smeared over her genitals, then put on bread and sold to male audience members.

I started by wheeling out my shopping cart full of surprises. The first thing I did was stick a mop handle in my puss and clean the stage floor. Then I pulled the mop handle out of my puss and made a lot of pussy farts. The audience always got a laugh out of that. I made my puss sound like a duck. I'd say, "I fucked a duck and the duck's still in there!" I lit a candle with a match, then extinguished the flame with my puss. Then I'd blow out the flame from three candles all at once. After that I put three candles in my puss, lit them, and stood on my head. I'd count down, and blast-off! The candles shot out of my puss like a rocket. I call that 'Pussy Propulsion'. After the candles, I smoked a cigarette in my puss and blew smoke rings in time with Glenn Miller swing music. This is an old-time trick for the smoker's stag parties. I used to be afraid of cancer because of the smoke. Then I pour Jergens lotion into my parts, which I then shoot 20 feet into the air. The guys within shooting range scatter in all directions! I joke that the guys who are close to me are in the "combat zone." Then I put talcum powder in my pussy, which I blow out in big white clouds. Then I shoot ping pong balls out; the powder gives me better grip on the ball so I can shoot them 15 to 20 feet. I prepare each ball carefully: I write 'Honeysuckle loves your balls' on them and then I wrap them each up in a baggie to keep the autograph dry, so whoever catches them can keep them as souvenirs.

== SCREW Magazine ==
Bruce David introduced Divine to Al Goldstein, editor of SCREW.

I first saw Honeysuckle as I walked into Jim Buckley's office, and there was this girl standing on her head shooting Jergens Lotion across the room—ejaculating it from her pussy onto the wall 19 feet away. I thought that was unbelievably disgusting, so naturally, we made her our symbol—like the Playboy Rabbit.

She is without a doubt the most unhygienic mass of femininity I've ever encountered. She's a one-woman slum. Honeysuckle is so dirty even I wouldn't touch her. She would keep an army of 19 shrinks so busy that they'd need shrinks to take care of them. But you know something? She's a sweet, nice, almost innocent kind of creature. And she's the only person on the staff who calls me Mr. Goldstein.

Divine wrote a column, "Diary of a Dirty Broad", for SCREW for several years. She appeared in Goldstein's movie, SOS: Screw on the Screen.

In the mid-1970s Divine took a hiatus from her bawdy act after she was arrested several times for obscenity in Philadelphia, Boston, and both Syracuse and Albany, New York. During this time she continued to work as a stripper doing a more conventional routine under a different name. However, Divine made a triumphant return to her original act in February 1976 in Cleveland, Ohio. Divine went on to perform to packed houses all over America. Divine was arrested once again on April 5, 1976 in Philadelphia as a "threat to local standards." Charged with open lewdness, the case was quashed and that decision was upheld by the Pennsylvania Supreme Court because her acts were performed before a consenting audience.

In late 1976, Divine began writing a regular column called "The Beehive" for Cheri magazine. On March 8, 1977, Divine was arrested for performing at the Aquarius Adult Center in Gloucester, New Jersey. This was followed by yet another arrest in New York in April 1977. In January 1979, Divine performed one of her best received shows at the Mitchell Brothers O'Farrell Theatre in San Francisco. In June 1983, Divine performed as part of a show called "Portable Vaudeville" at a theater in Amsterdam. Divine continued to tour the country and perform in clubs throughout the mid-1980s.

Divine has long since retired from the burlesque and striptease circuits. As of 2014, she was living in a small town in her native Illinois.

== Other accomplishments ==
On June 16, 1978, Honeysuckle Divine's associate Kellie Everts gave her Fatima speech in front of the White House in Washington, D.C. Divine had arranged for it and initially applied for the permit for the event before Everts had even arrived in Washington.

== Columns ==
=== SCREW ===
- "Honeysuckle Pounds the Pork". SCREW (227). July 9, 1973.
- "Down and Out with Honeysuckle". SCREW (230). October 8, 1973.
- "Diary of a Dirty Broad: Hyman [sic] in the Footlights". SCREW (231). August 6, 1973.
- "Backstage Back Stabbing". SCREW (233). August 20, 1973.
- "A Nose for Newsmen". SCREW (235). September 3, 1973.
- "Tampax Tomfoolery". SCREW (230). July 30, 1973.
- "What Do LBJ, Everett Dirksen and Pierre Salinger Have in Common?". SCREW (249). December 10, 1973.
- "Out, Out Damn Drip". SCREW (250). December 17, 1973.
- "Can You Spare Any Change?". SCREW (251). December 24, 1973.
- "Black is Bootyful: A Boon for Coons". SCREW (252). December 31, 1973.
- "Spare the Child, Spoil the Rod". SCREW (253). January 7, 1974.
- "Right to Knife". SCREW (254). January 14, 1974.
- "Perils of the Placenta". SCREW (255). January 21, 1974.
- "Afterbirth Control". SCREW (256). January 28, 1974.
- "Down on Your Niece". SCREW (257). February 4, 1974.
- "A Niece Piece". SCREW (258). February 11, 1974.
- "Nailed on the Blue Cross". SCREW (259). February 18, 1974.
- "Hermaphrodite Hubby". SCREW (260). February 25, 1974.
- "Land of Milk and Honey". SCREW (261). March 4, 1974.
- "A Pussy with Pluck". SCREW (262). March 11, 1974.
- "Stripper on the Skids". SCREW (263). March 18, 1974.
- "Flower of the Half Hour". SCREW (264). March 25, 1974.
- "A Stripper in Sodom". SCREW (265). April 1, 1974.
- "The Heaving Hooker". SCREW (266). April 8, 1974.
- "Streetwalking Strumpet". SCREW (267). April 15, 1974.
- "Balled in the Boondocks". SCREW (271). May 13, 1974.
- "Last Tango in Lindenhurst". SCREW (273). May 27, 1974.
- "Peter Meet Her". SCREW (279). July 8, 1974.
- "Peter on a Pedestal". SCREW (280). July 15, 1974.
- "Guys in Disguise". SCREW (283). August 5, 1974.
- "Writing Her Wrongs". SCREW (287). September 2, 1974.
- "Dame in Distress". SCREW (289). September 16, 1974.
- "Working on the Gang Bang". SCREW (290). September 23, 1974.
- "The Puke of Windsor". SCREW (299). November 25, 1974.
- "No Exit Ecdysiast". SCREW (305). January 6, 1975.
- "Dimwit in the Dark". SCREW (306). January 13, 1975.

=== Cheri ===
- "My Bust: Honeysuckle Divine vs. The Law". Cheri. 1 (3). October 1976.
- "Honeysuckle Talks About 'Her' President". Cheri. 1 (4). November 1976.
- "Detroit: Honeysuckle Rates Motown's Muffdivers". Cheri. 1 (5). December 1976.
- "Pittsburgh: Honeysuckle Spurts in Steeltown". Cheri. 1 (6). January 1977.
- "Honeysuckle's Hottest Washington Expose". Cheri. 1 (7). February 1977.
- "Pittsburgh's Pussyburger Club". Cheri. 1 (8). March 1977.
- "Honeysuckle from Washington". Cheri. 1 (9). April 1977.
- "Ballbuster's Etiquette". Cheri. 1 (10). May 1977.
- "Honeysuckle Sprays". Cheri. 2 (1). August 1977.
- "Honeysuckle in Philly". Cheri. 2 (4). November 1977.
- "Washington's New Pussygate Scandal: Why G-Men Own G-Strings". Cheri. 2 (8). March 1978.
- "Honeysuckle Busted in Our Backyard". Cheri. 2 (9). April 1978.
