= Matriarchal religion =

Religion that focuses on a goddess or goddesses

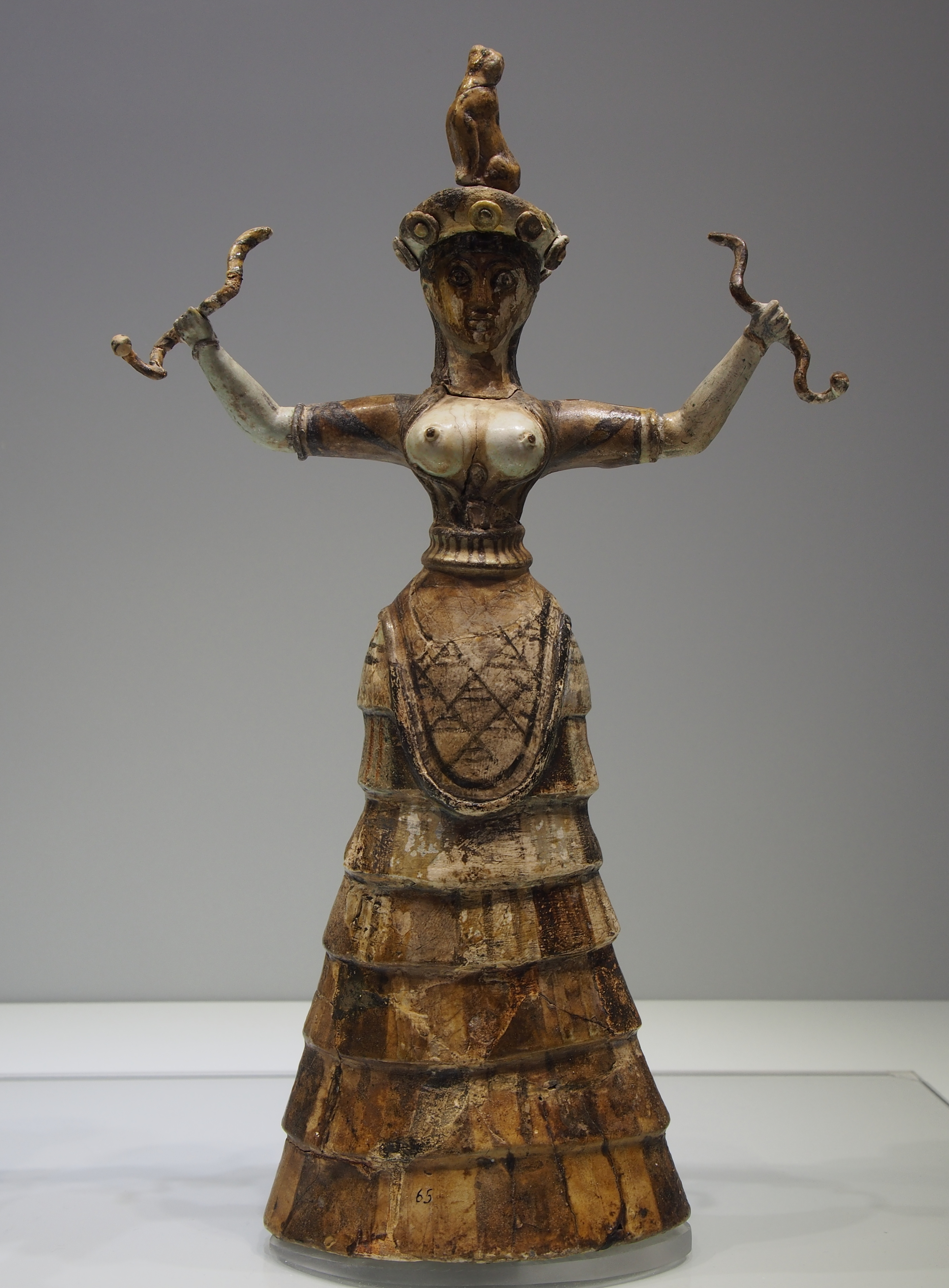
The Minoan snake goddess figurines, though an almost unique find, feature frequently in literature postulating matriarchal religion

A matriarchal religion is a religion that emphasizes a goddess or multiple goddesses as central figures of worship and spiritual authority. The term is most often used to refer to theories of prehistoric matriarchal religions that were proposed by scholars such as Johann Jakob Bachofen, Jane Ellen Harrison, and Marija Gimbutas, and later popularized by second-wave feminism. These scholars speculated that early human societies may have been organized around female deities and matrilineal social structures. In the 20th century, a movement to revive these practices resulted in the Goddess movement.

== History ==
The concept of a prehistoric matriarchy was introduced in 1861 when Johann Jakob Bachofen published Mother Right: An Investigation of the Religious and Juridical Character of Matriarchy in the Ancient World. He postulated that the historical patriarchates were a comparatively recent development, having replaced an earlier state of primeval matriarchy, and postulated a "chthonic-maternal" prehistoric religion. Bachofen presents a model where matriarchal society and chthonic mystery cults are the second of four stages of the historical development of religion. The first stage, he called "Hetaerism," was characterized as a Paleolithic hunter-and-gatherer society that practiced a polyamorous and communistic lifestyle. The second stage is the Neolithic, a matriarchal lunar stage of agriculture with an early form of Demeter, the dominant deity. This was followed by a "Dionysian" stage of emerging patriarchy, finally succeeded by the "Apollonian" stage of patriarchy and the appearance of civilization in classical antiquity. The idea that this period was a golden age that was displaced by the advent of patriarchy was first described by Friedrich Engels in his The Origin of the Family, Private Property, and the State.

The British archaeologist Sir Arthur Evans, the main rediscoverer and promoter of Minoan civilization, believed that Minoan religion more or less exclusively worshiped a mother goddess, and his view held sway for the first part of the 20th century, with a wide-ranging influence on thinking in various fields. Modern scholars agree that a mother or nature goddess was probably a dominant deity, but that there were also male deities.

In the early 1900s, historian Jane Ellen Harrison put forward the theory that the Olympian pantheon replaced an earlier worship of earth goddesses.

Robert Graves postulated a prehistoric matriarchal religion in the 1950s, in his The Greek Myths and The White Goddess, and gave a detailed depiction of a future society with a matriarchal religion in his novel Seven Days in New Crete.

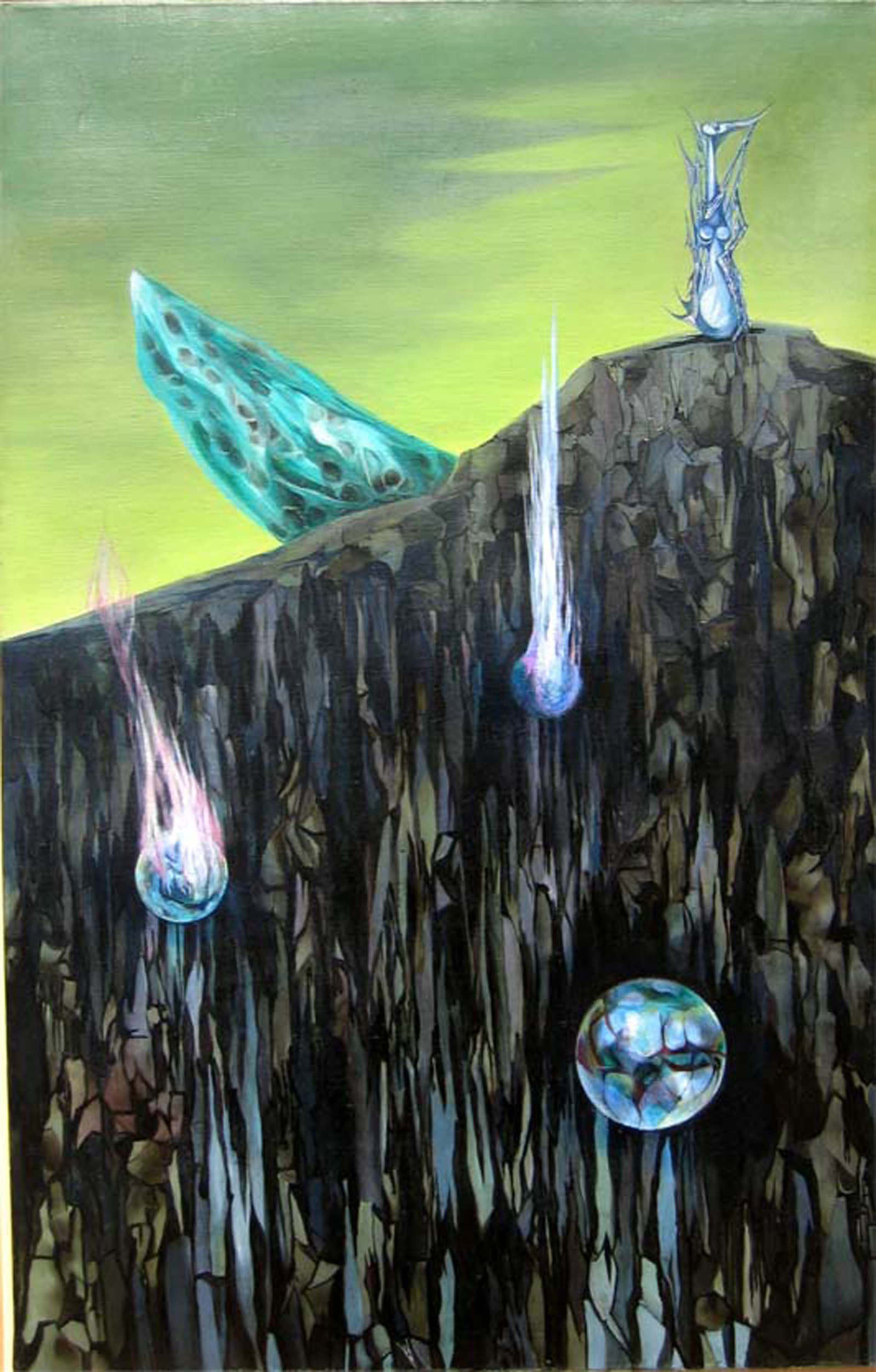
Verbotenes Land ("Forbidden Land"), 1936

Inspired by Graves and other sources was the Austrian Surrealist Wolfgang Paalen who, in his painting Pays interdit ("Forbidden Land"), draws an apocalyptic landscape dominated by a female goddess and, as symbols of the male gods, fallen, meteorite-like planets.

== Second-wave feminism and the Goddess movement ==
The ideas of Bachofen and Graves were taken up in the 1970s by second-wave feminists, such as author Merlin Stone, who took the Paleolithic Venus figurines as evidence of prehistorical matriarchal religion. She presents matriarchal religions as involving a "cult of serpents" as a major symbol of spiritual wisdom, fertility, life, strength.

Additionally, anthropologist Marija Gimbutas introduced the field of feminist archaeology in the 1970s. Her books The Goddesses and Gods of Old Europe (1974), The Language of the Goddess (1989), and The Civilization of the Goddess (1991) became standard works for the theory that a patriarchic or "androcratic" culture originated in the Bronze Age, replacing a Neolithic Goddess-centered worldview. These theories were presented as scholarly hypotheses, albeit from an ideological viewpoint, in the 1970s, but they also influenced feminist spirituality and especially feminist branches of Neo-paganism that also arose during the 1970s (see Dianic Wicca and Reclaiming (Neopaganism)), so that Matriarchal Religion is also a contemporary new religious movement within the larger field of neopaganism, generally known as the Goddess movement.

== Triple goddess and other deities ==
There is a deity known within the movement and other spiritual groups as the Triple Goddess, who is the representation of a woman's stages or life. Members say, it's not strictly for women but for a general guide through childhood, maturity and old age but it strongly correlates with women. The Triple Goddess is a deity that is worshiped by a large swath of neopagan groups; women, children and men. In these movements, she is seen as a deity that helps people understand what is happening in their lives in all ages. Many believe the stages within women that the Triple Goddess guides them through is maiden/youth, then mother and lover and finally wise woman. All of this is rooted from Pagan people and their beliefs but has gone through changes throughout time yet her main representation has remained the same.

Triple goddess symbol

=== Other deities ===
- Aphrodite - goddess of love
- Aditi - mother of the gods
- Calypso - goddess of silence
- Durga - warrior goddess
- Harmonia - goddess of harmony
- Inanna - queen of heaven, goddess of rain and moonlight
- Mahadevi - supreme almighty goddess

== See also ==
- Emma Curtis Hopkins
- Erich Neumann (psychologist)
- Eternal feminine
- Feminist theology
- Gender and religion
- Goddess movement
- Great Goddess hypothesis
- Mother goddess#Christianity
- Mariolatry
- Rasa von Werder
- Riane Eisler
- Thealogy
- William Bond (author)
- Witch-cult hypothesis
