= 2017 Rising Phoenix World Championships =

- Promotion: IFBB; Wings of Strength; Tim Gardner Productions; Digital Muscle
- Date: September 9, 2017
- City: (United States) Talking Stick Resort, Scottsdale, Arizona

Event chronology
2016	2017 Rising Phoenix World Championships	2018

The 2017 Rising Phoenix World Championships was an IFBB Wings of Strength female professional bodybuilding competition and held in conjunction with the IFBB Arizona Pro. It was held on September 9, 2017 at the Talking Stick Resort in Scottsdale, Arizona.

== Call outs ==
=== Prejudging ===
1. Cristina Franzoso, Victoria Dominguez, Lisa Cross, Kim Buck, Nicki Chartrand, Sheila Bleck, Rita Bello, and Irene Andersen
2. Pauline Nelson, Maria Mikola, Kimberly McGuire, Wendy McCready, Silvia Matta, Janeen Lankowski, Elena Hreapca, Theresa Ivancik
3. Aleesha Young, Helle Trevino, Tischa Thomas, Bonnie Switzer-Pappas, Virginia Sanchez, Angela Rayburn, and Yaxeni Oriquen-Garcia
4. Helle Trevino (later switches place with Wendy McCready), Wendy McCready (later switches place with Helle Trevino), Sheila Bleck, and Yaxeni Oriquen-Garcia
5. Virginia Sanchez (later switches place with Irene Andersen), Irene Andersen (later switches place with Virginia Sanchez), Wendy McCready, Yaxeni Oriquen-Garcia, Aleesha Young (later switches place with Kim Buck, later switched back with Kim Buck), Kim Buck (later switches place with Aleesha Young, later switched back with Aleesha Young)
6. Lisa Cross (later switches place with Irene Andersen, later switched with Aleesha Young), Irene Andersen (later switches place with Lisa Cross), Aleesha Young (later switches place with Silvia Matta, later switched back with Silvia Matta, and later switched with Lisa Cross), Rita Bello, Janeen Lankowski, and Silvia Matta (later switches place with Aleesha Young, later switched back with Aleesha Young)
7. Pauline Nelson, Kimberly McGuire (later switches place with Maria Mikola), Angela Rayburn (later switches place with Elena Hreapca, later switches place with Theresa Ivancik), Maria Mikola (later switches place with Kimberly McGuire), Elena Hreapca (later switches place with Angela Rayburn), and Theresa Ivancik (later switches place with Angela Rayburn)
8. Silvia Matta (later switches place with Bonnie Switzer-Pappas), Tischa Thomas, Bonnie Switzer-Pappas (later switches place with Silvia Matta), Victoria Dominguez, and Cristina Franzoso
9. Helle Trevino and Sheila Bleck
10. Wendy McCready (later switches place with Virginia Sanchez), Virginia Sanchez (later switches place with Wendy McCready), Yaxeni Oriquen-Garcia, and Kim Buck

=== Confirmation round ===
1. Helle Trevino (later switches place with Yaxeni Oriquen-Garcia), Yaxeni Oriquen-Garcia (later switches place with Helle Trevino), Sheila Bleck, and Wendy McCready
2. Lisa Cross (later switched place with Lisa Cross), Virginia Sanchez (later switches place with Rita Bello), Rita Bello (later switches place with Virginia Sanchez), Kim Buck (later switches place with Aleesha Young), and Aleesha Young (later switches place with Kim Buck, later switched place with Lisa Cross)
3. Maria Mikola, Nicki Chartrand (later switches place with Irene Andersen), Janeen Lankowski, Silvia Matta (later switches place with Irene Andersen), Elena Hreapca, and Irene Andersen (later switches place with Silvia Matta, later switches place with Nicki Chartrand)
4. Bonnie Switzer-Pappas, Theresa Ivancik (later switches place with Kimberly McGuire), Victoria Dominguez, Tischa Thomas, Kimberly McGuire (later switches place with Theresa Ivancik), Angela Rayburn, Pauline Nelson, Cristina Franzoso

== Prize money ==
=== Overall award prize money ===
- 1st - $50,000 + $65,000 customized Jeep
- 2nd - $25,000
- 3rd - $12,500
- 4th - $7,500
- 5th - $5,000

Total: $100,000 + $65,000 customized Jeep

=== Best poser award prize money ===
- 1st - $6,000
- 2nd - $3,000
- 3rd - $2,000

Total: $11,000

=== Most muscular award prize money ===
- 1st - $7,000

Total: $7,000

=== Best intro video award prize money ===
- 1st - $5,000
- 2nd - $3,000
- 3rd - $2,000

Total: $10,000

== Results ==
=== Overall results ===
- 1st - Helle Trevino
- 2nd - Sheila Bleck
- 3rd - Yaxeni Oriquen-Garcia
- 4th - Wendy McCready
- 5th - Virginia Sanchez
- 6th - Aleesha Young
- 7th - Kim Buck
- 8th - Rita Bello
- 9th - Lisa Cross
- 10th - Janeen Lankowski
- 11th - Silvia Matta
- 12th - Nicki Chartrand
- 13th - Irene Andersen
- 14th - Maria Mikola
- 15th - Kimberly McGuire
- 16th - Victoria Dominguez
- 16th - Cristina Franzoso
- 16th - Elena Hreapca
- 16th - Theresa Ivancik
- 16th - Pauline Nelson
- 16th - Angela Rayburn
- 16th - Bonnie Switzer-Pappas
- 16th - Tischa Thomas

Comparison to previous Rising Phoenix World Championships results:

- +2 - Helle Trevino
- Same - Sheila Bleck
- +2 - Yaxeni Oriquen-Garcia
- +7 - Virginia Sanchez
- Same - Aleesha Young
- -1 - Kim Buck
- +2 - Rita Bello
- -2 - Lisa Cross
- +3- Silvia Matta
- -5 - Irene Andersen
- -5 - Angela Rayburn

==== Scorecard ====
No	Name	Country	Judging	Finals	Total	Place
1	Irene Andersen	Sweden	34	41	75	13
2	Rita Bello	Argentina	25	22	47	8
3	Sheila Bleck	(United States) Tampa, Florida	4	5 *	9 *	2
4	Nicki Chartrand	Alberta, Canada	39	34	73	12
5	Kim Buck	(United States) Jonesboro, Georgia	17	25	42 *	7
6	Lisa Cross	United Kingdom	26	22	48	9
7	Victoria Dominguez	(United States) Lewisville, Texas	48	48	96	16
8	Cristina Franzoso	Italy	48	48	96	16
9	Elena Oana Hreapca	Romania	48	48	96	16
10	Theresa Ivancik	(United States) Butler, Pennsylvania	48	48	96	16
11	Janeen Lankowski	(United States) Tampa, Florida	32	31	63	10
12	Silvia Matta	Italy	35	36	71	11
13	Wendy McCready	United Kingdom	13	12	25	4
14	Kimberly McGuire	(United States) Indianapolis, Indiana	43	45	88	15
15	Maria Mikola	Ontario, Canada	41	42	83	14
16	Pauline Nelson	(United States) North Plainfield, New Jersey	48	48	96	16
17	Yaxeni Oriquen	(Venezuela) Miami, Florida	9	9	18	3
18	Angela Rayburn	(United States) Columbia, Mississippi	48	48	96	16
19	Virginia Sanchez	Spain	16	16	32	5
20	Bonnie Switzer-Pappas	(United States) Bourne, Massachusetts	48	48	96	16
21	Tischa Thomas	(United States) New York City, New York	48	48	96	16
22	Helle Trevino	(Denmark) Venice, California	5	4	9 *	1
23	Aleesha Young	(United States) Lehi, Utah	25	17	42 *	6

* Tie broken by final round

=== Best poser results ===
- 1st - Sheila Bleck
- 2nd - Virginia Sanchez
- 3rd - Pauline Nelson

=== Most muscular winner ===
- Winner - Aleesha Young

Comparison to previous Rising Phoenix World Championships results:

- +1 - Aleesha Young
- -1 - Sheila Bleck

=== Best intro results ===
- 1st - Silvia Matta
- 2nd - Nicki Chartrand
- 3rd - Teresa Ivancik

== Attended ==
- 3rd Rising Phoenix World Championships attended - Helle Trevino, Yaxeni Oriquen-Garcia, Lisa Cross, Irene Andersen, Rita Bello, and Aleesha Young
- 2nd Rising Phoenix World Championships attended - Sheila Bleck, Kim Buck, Angela Rayburn, Virginia Sanchez, and Silvia Matta
- 1st Rising Phoenix World Championships attended - Wendy McCready, Janeen Lankowski, Maria Mikola, Kimberly McGuire, Victoria Dominguez, Cristina Franzoso, Elena Hreapca, Theresa Ivancik, Pauline Nelson, Bonnie Switzer-Pappas, and Tischa Thomas
- Previous year Olympia attendees who did not attend - Margaret Martin, Isabelle Turell, Alana Shipp, Alina Popa, Nancy Clark, Jacqueline Fuchs, Lora Ottenad, Amanda Aivaliotis, and Laura Carolan

== Notable events ==
- This was Helle Trevino's 1st Ms Rising Phoenix overall award win. Both Helle Trevino and Sheila Bleck tied, with the tie being broken by final round.
- This was Sheila Bleck's 2nd Ms Rising Phoenix best poser award win.
- This was Aleesha Young's 1st Ms Rising Phoenix most muscular award win.
- This was Silvia Matta's 1st Ms Rising Phoenix best intro award win.
- The 2017 Rising Phoenix World Championships was held on Irene Andersen's birthday.
- Margie Martin, Alina Popa, and Brittney O'Veal all qualified, but did not attend. This is the first time a Ms Rising Phoenix title holder would not be defending her title.

== 2017 Rising Phoenix World Championships Qualified ==
Name	Country	How Qualified
Margie Martin	(United States)	2016 Rising Phoenix World Championships - 1st
Sheila Bleck	(United States)	2016 Rising Phoenix World Championships - 2nd
Alina Popa	(Romania)	2016 Rising Phoenix World Championships - 3rd
Helle Trevino	(Denmark)	2016 Rising Phoenix World Championships - 4th
Yaxeni Oriquen-Garcia	(Venezuela)	2016 Rising Phoenix World Championships - 5th
Kim Buck	(United States)	2017 Toronto Pro Supershow - 1st
Silvia Matta	(Italy)	2017 Puerto Rico Pro - 1st
Maria Mikola	(Canada)	2017 Omaha Pro - 1st
Brittney O'Veal	(United States)	2017 Chicago Pro - 1st
Oana Hreapca	(Romania)	2017 Ms. International Classic - 1st (heavyweight and overall)
Nicki Chartrand	(Canada)	2017 Lenda Murray Pro - 1st
Wendy McCready	(United Kingdom)	2017 Toronto Pro Supershow - 3rd 2017 Chicago Pro - 3rd
Lisa Cross	(United Kingdom)	2017 Tampa Pro - 2nd
Rita Bello	(Argentina)	2017 Puerto Rico Pro - 2nd
Bonnie Switzer-Pappas	(United States)	2017 Omaha Pro - 2nd
Victoria Dominquez	(United States)	2017 Chicago Pro - 2nd
Theresa Ivancik	(United States)	2017 Lenda Murray Pro - 2nd
Irene Anderson	(Sweden)	2017 Puerto Rico Pro - 3rd 2017 Omaha Pro - 5th
Pauline Nelson	(United States)	2017 Tampa Pro - 3rd
Kimberly McGuire	(United States)	2017 Omaha Pro - 3rd
Tischa Thomas	(United States)	2017 Lenda Murray Pro - 3rd
Virginia Sanchez	(Spain)	2017 Tampa Pro - 4th
Angela Rayburn	(United States)	2017 Omaha Pro - 4th 2017 Tampa Pro - 5th
Aleesha Young	(United States)	Special invite
Jacqueline Fuchs	(Switzerland)	Special invite
Janeen Lankowski	(Canada)	Special invite
Cristina Franzoso	(Italy)	Special invite

=== Points standings ===
Ranking^{1}	Name	Country	Points
1	Wendy McCready	(United Kingdom)	6
2	Lisa Cross	(United Kingdom)	5
3	Rita Bello	(Argentina)	4
3	Bonnie Switzer-Pappas	(United States)	4
3	Victoria Dominquez	(United States)	4
3	Theresa Ivancik	(United States)	4
3	Irene Anderson	(Sweden)	4
3	Pauline Nelson	(United States)	4
4	Kimberly McGuire	(United States)	3
4	Tischa Thomas	(United States)	3
4	Virginia Sanchez	(Spain)	3
4	Angela Rayburn	(United States)	3
5	Selma Labat	(Brazil)	2
5	Robin Hillis	(Canada)	2
5	Jana Bendova	(Czech Republic)	2
6	Cristina Franzoso	(Italy)	2
6	Tananarive Huie	(Canada)	1
6	Patty Corbett	(United States)	1
6	LaDawn McDay	(United States)	1
6	Jacqueline Fuchs	(Switzerland)	1

^{1} In the event of a tie, the competitor with the best top five contest placings will be awarded the qualification. If both competitors have the same contest placings, than both will qualify for the Rising Phoenix World Championships.

== Pictures ==
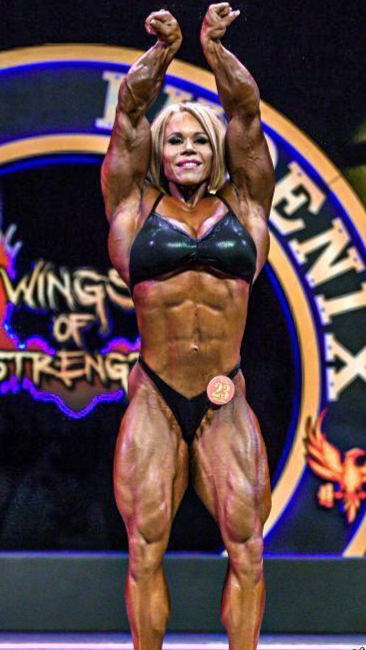

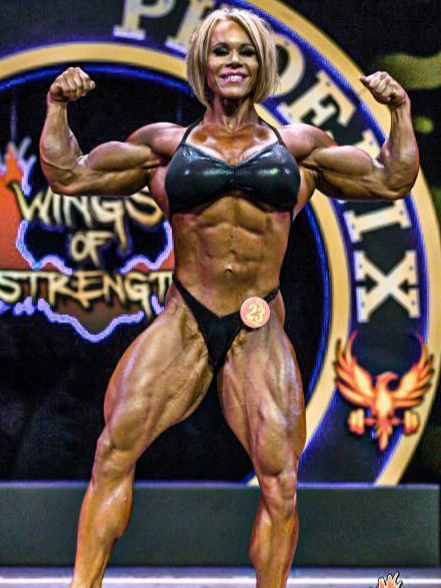

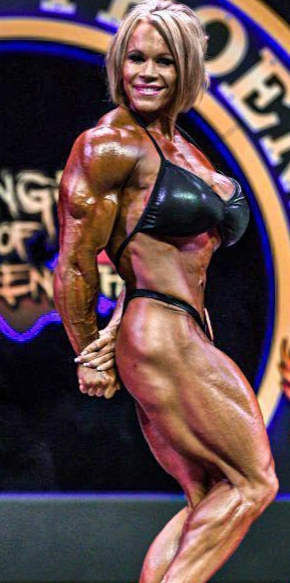

== See also ==
- 2017 Mr. Olympia
