= 2018 Rising Phoenix World Championships =

Female Bodybuilder Competition

- Promotion: IFBB; Wings of Strength
- Date: September 8, 2018
- City: Wild Horse Pass Hotel & Casino, Chandler, Arizona

Event chronology
2017	2018 Rising Phoenix World Championships	2019

The 2018 Rising Phoenix World Championships was an IFBB Wings of Strength female professional bodybuilding competition and held in conjunction with the IFBB Arizona Pro. It was held on September 8, 2018 at the Wild Horse Pass Hotel & Casino in Chandler, Arizona.

== Prize money ==
=== Overall award prize money ===
- 1st - $50,000 + $100,000 Corvette
- 2nd - $25,000
- 3rd - $12,500
- 4th - $7,500
- 5th - $5,000

Total: $100,000 + $100,000 Corvette

=== Best poser award prize money ===
This award was sponsored by Elevation Solar, MuscleGirlzLive, and Wings of Strength.

- 1st - $5,000
- 2nd - $2,000
- 3rd - $1,000

Total: $8,000

=== Best intro video award prize money ===
This award was sponsored by Offerpad, MAS Body Construction, and MELODY and KARLETTA SPETKO .

- 1st - $5,000
- 2nd - $2,000
- 3rd - $1,000

Total: $8,000

=== Most muscular award prize money ===
This award was sponsored by Muscle Angels, HerBiceps.com, and Wings of Strength.

Total: $7,000

== Results ==
=== Overall results ===
- 1st - Alina Popa
- 2nd - Margaret Martin
- 3rd - Sheila Bleck
- 4th - Nicole Chartrand
- 5th - Helle Trevino
- 6th - Jill Blondin
- 7th - Virginia Sanchez
- 8th - Tananarive Huie
- 9th - LaDawn McDay
- 10th - Maria Mikola
- 11th - Jacqueline Fuchs
- 12th - Maryse Manios
- 13th - Susanna Jacobs
- 14th - Wendy McCready
- 15th - Barbara Carità
- 16th - Patty Corbett
- 16th - Cristina Franzoso
- 16th - Pauline Nelson
- 16th - Angela Rayburn
- 16th - Isabelle Turell

Comparison to previous Rising Phoenix World Championships results:

- +2 - Alina Popa
- -1 - Margaret Martin
- -1 - Sheila Bleck
- +8 - Nicole Chartrand
- -4 - Helle Trevino
- -2 - Virginia Sanchez
- +4 - Maria Mikola
- +1 - Jacqueline Fuchs
- -10 - Wendy McCready
- Same - Cristina Franzoso
- Same - Pauline Nelson
- Same - Angela Rayburn
- -3 - Isabelle Turell

==== Scorecard ====
No			Judging	Finals	Total	Place
1	Sheila Bleck	(United States) Tampa, Florida	9	11	20	3
2	Jill Blondin	(United States) Worcester, Massachusetts	18	18	36	6
3	Barbara Carita	Italy	45	45	90	15
4	Nicole Chartrand	Alberta, Canada	12	10	22	4
5	Patty Corbett	(United States) Cotati, California	48	48	96	16
6	Cristina Franzoso	Italy	48	48	96	16
7	Jacqueline Fuchs	Switzerland	31	31	62	11
8	Tananarive Huie	Ontario, Canada	26	26	52	8
9	Susanna Jacobs	(United States) Woodland Hills, California	38	38	76	13
10	Maryse Manios	France	36	36	72	12
11	Margie Martin	(United States) Riverdale, Georgia	5	6	11	2
12	LaDawn McDay	(United States) Detroit, Michigan	30	25	55	9
13	Maria Mikola	Ontario, Canada	27	30	57	10
14	Wendy McCready	(United Kingdom) England	42	42	84	14
15	Pauline Nelson	(United States) Brooklyn, New York	48	48	96	16
16	Alina Popa	Romania	4	3	7	1
17	Angela Rayburn	(United States) Columbia, Mississippi	48	48	96	16
18	Virginia Sanchez	Spain	21	21	42	7
19	Helle Trevino	(United States) Venice, California	15	15	30	5
20	Isabelle Turell	(United States) Terre Haute, Indiana	48	48	96	16

=== Best poser results ===
- 1st - Nicole Chartrand
- 2nd - Sheila Bleck
- 3rd - Pauline Nelson

Comparison to previous Rising Phoenix World Championships results:

- -1 - Sheila Bleck
- Same - Pauline Nelson

=== Best intro results ===
- 1st - LaDawn McDay
- 2nd - Virginia Sanchez
- 3rd - Alina Popa

=== Most muscular winner ===
- Winner - Helle Trevino

Comparison to previous Rising Phoenix World Championships results:

- +1 - Helle Trevino
- -1 - Aleesha Young

== 2018 Rising Phoenix World Championships Qualified ==
Name	Country	How Qualified
Helle Trevino	(Denmark)	2017 Rising Phoenix World Championships - 1st
Sheila Bleck	(United States)	2017 Rising Phoenix World Championships - 2nd
Yaxeni Oriquen-Garcia	(Venezuela)	2017 Rising Phoenix World Championships - 3rd
Wendy McCready	(United Kingdom)	2017 Rising Phoenix World Championships - 4th
Virginia Sanchez	(Spain)	2017 Rising Phoenix World Championships - 5th
Nicole Chartrand	(Canada)	2018 Hawaii Pro Women's Bodybuilding - 1st
Maryse Manios	(France)	2018 Galaxy Pro Women's Bodybuilding - 1st
Barbara Carità	(Italy)	2018 San Marino Pro Women's Bodybuilding - 1st
Margaret Martin	(United States)	2015 Rising Phoenix World Championships - 1st 2016 Rising Phoenix World Championships - 1st
Maria Mikola	(Canada)	2018 Toronto Pro Supershow Women's Bodybuilding - 2nd
Isabelle Turell	(United States)	2018 Omaha Pro Women's Bodybuilding - 1st
Jill Blondin	(United States)	2018 Chicago Pro Women's Bodybuilding - 1st
Jacqueline Fuchs	(Switzerland)	2018 Lenda Murray Pro Women's Bodybuilding - 1st
Susanna Jacobs	(United States)	2018 Ms. International Classic - 1st (middleweight and overall)
Alina Popa	(Romania)	2018 Tampa Pro Women's Bodybuilding - 1st
Cristina Franzoso	(Italy)	2018 Galaxy Pro Women's Bodybuilding - 2nd 2018 San Marino Pro Women's Bodybuilding - 2nd
LaDawn McDay	(United States)	2018 Omaha Pro Women's Bodybuilding - 3rd 2018 Tampa Pro Women's Bodybuilding - 3rd
Amanda Smith	(Canada)	2018 Omaha Pro Women's Bodybuilding - 5th 2018 Chicago Pro Women's Bodybuilding - 5th
Jennie Roosa	(United States)	2018 Hawaii Pro Women's Bodybuilding - 2nd
Tananarive Huie	(Canada)	2018 Toronto Pro Supershow Women's Bodybuilding - 3rd
Tara Silzer	(United States)	2018 Lenda Murray Pro Women's Bodybuilding - 2nd
Angela Rayburn	(United States)	2018 Omaha Pro Women's Bodybuilding - 4th 2018 Chicago Pro Women's Bodybuilding - 7th
Patty Corbett	(United States)	2018 Hawaii Pro Women's Bodybuilding - 3rd 2018 Toronto Pro Supershow Women's Bodybuilding - 7th
Pauline Nelson	(United States)	2018 Tampa Pro Women's Bodybuilding - 2nd

=== Points standings ===
Ranking^{1}	Name	Country	Points
1	Cristina Franzoso	(Italy)	8
2	LaDawn McDay	(United States)	7
3	Amanda Smith	(Canada)	5
4	Jennie Roosa	(United States)	4
5	Tananarive Huie	(Canada)	4
6	Tara Silzer	(United States)	4
7	Angela Rayburn	(United States)	4
8	Patty Corbett	(United States)	4
9	Pauline Nelson	(United States)	4
10	Cristina Maffeis	(United States)	3
11	Silvia Matta	(Italy)	3
12	Bonnie Switzer	(United States)	3
13	Donna Salib	(United States)	2
14	Rita Bello	(United States)	2
15	Lisa Cross	(United Kingdom)	2
16	Kim Buck	(United States)	2
17	Amy Hauck	(United States)	1

^{1} In the event of a tie, the competitor with the best top five contest placings will be awarded the qualification. If both competitors have the same contest placings, than both will qualify for the Rising Phoenix World Championships.

== Notable events ==
- This was Alina Popa's 1st Ms Rising Phoenix overall award win.
- This was Nicole Chartrand's 1st Ms Rising Phoenix best poser award win.
- This was LaDawn McDay's 1st Ms Rising Phoenix best intro award win.
- This was Helle Trevino's 1st Ms Rising Phoenix most muscular award win.
- This will be the first Rising Phoenix World Championships that will have two Ms Rising Phoenix champions competing against each other.
- Yaxeni Oriquen-Garcia qualified, but will not attend.

== See also ==
- 2018 Mr. Olympia
