= 2021 Rising Phoenix World Championships =

Bodybuilding competition

- Promotion: Tim Gardner Productions; IFBB Professional League; Wings of Strength
- Date: 11 September 2021
- Venue: Talking Stick Resort
- City: Scottsdale, Arizona, United States of America

Event chronology
2020	2021 Rising Phoenix World Championships	2022

The 2021 Rising Phoenix World Championships was a professional bodybuilding competition for women that was held in conjunction with Arizona Women's Pro and the NPC Wings of Strength Arizona Women's Extravaganza. It was held on 11 September 2021 at the Talking Stick Resort in Scottsdale, Arizona, United States of America. It was the 7th Rising Phoenix World Championships to be held.

== Results ==
=== Scorecard ===
No	Name	Country	Judging	Finals	Total	Place
1	Irene Anderson	Sweden	36		36	12
2	Michaela Aycock	(United States) Bartow, Florida	12		12	4
3	MayLa Ash	(United States) Irving, Texas	33		33	11
4	Reshanna Boswell	(United States) Chicago, Illinois	30		30	10
5	Nicki Chartrand	(United States) Bullhead City, Arizona	22		22	8
6	Leah Dennie	(United States) North Richland Hills, Texas	17		17*	5
7	Asha Hadley	(United States) Tomball, Texas	17		17*	6
8	Natalia Kovaleva	(United States) Chandler, Arizona	48		48	16
9	Janeen Lankowski	(United States) Tampa, Florida	21		21	7
10	LaDawn McDay	(United States) Detroit, Michigan	42		42	14
11	Sheena Ohlig	(United States) Camden, New Jersey	27		27	9
12	Mona Poursaleh	Canada	9		9	3
13	Angela Rayburn	(United States) Columbia, Mississippi	39		30	13
14	Andrea Shaw	(United States) Clinton Township, Michigan	3		3	1
15	Helle Trevino	(United States) Venice, California	6		6	2
16	Tina Williams	(United States) Lawrence, Kansas	45		54	15

* All Ties are broke by relative placing

=== Best intro video award ===
- 1st - LaDawn McDay
- 2nd - Janeen Lankowski
- 3rd - Nicole Chartrand

=== Best poser award ===
- 1st - Mona Poursaleh
- 2nd - Janeen Lankowski
- 3rd - MayLa Ash

=== Most muscular award ===
- Irene Andersen

== Notable events ==
- This was Andrea Shaw's 2nd Ms. Rising Phoenix title win.
- Like the 2020 Rising Phoenix World Championships, there was a severe lack of non-American residential competitors due to COVID-19 travel restrictions.

== Prize money ==
Best video award

- 3rd - $2,000
- 2nd - $3,000
- 1st - $5,000
- Total - $10,000

Best poser award

- 3rd - $2,000
- 2nd - $3,000
- 1st - $5,000
- Total - $10,000

Most muscular award

- $7,000

Ms. Rising Phoenix

- 5th - $5,000
- 4th - $7,500
- 3rd - $12,500
- 2nd - $25,000
- 1st - $50,000 & American prize vehicle
- Total - $100,000 & American prize vehicle

Total overall - $120,000 & American prize vehicle

== Official competitors list ==
- Irene Anderson
- MayLa Ash
- Reshanna Bosewell
- Nicki Chartrand
- Asha Hadley
- Monique Jones
- Natalia Kovaleva
- Janeen Lankowski
- Silvia Matta
- Kristina Mendoza
- Mona Poursaleh
- Angela Rayburn
- Virginia Sanchez
- Andrea Shaw
- Helle Trevino
- Tina Williams
- Aleesha Young
- Sandra Hewins
