= Helle Trevino =

Danish professional female bodybuilder

- professional bodybuilder
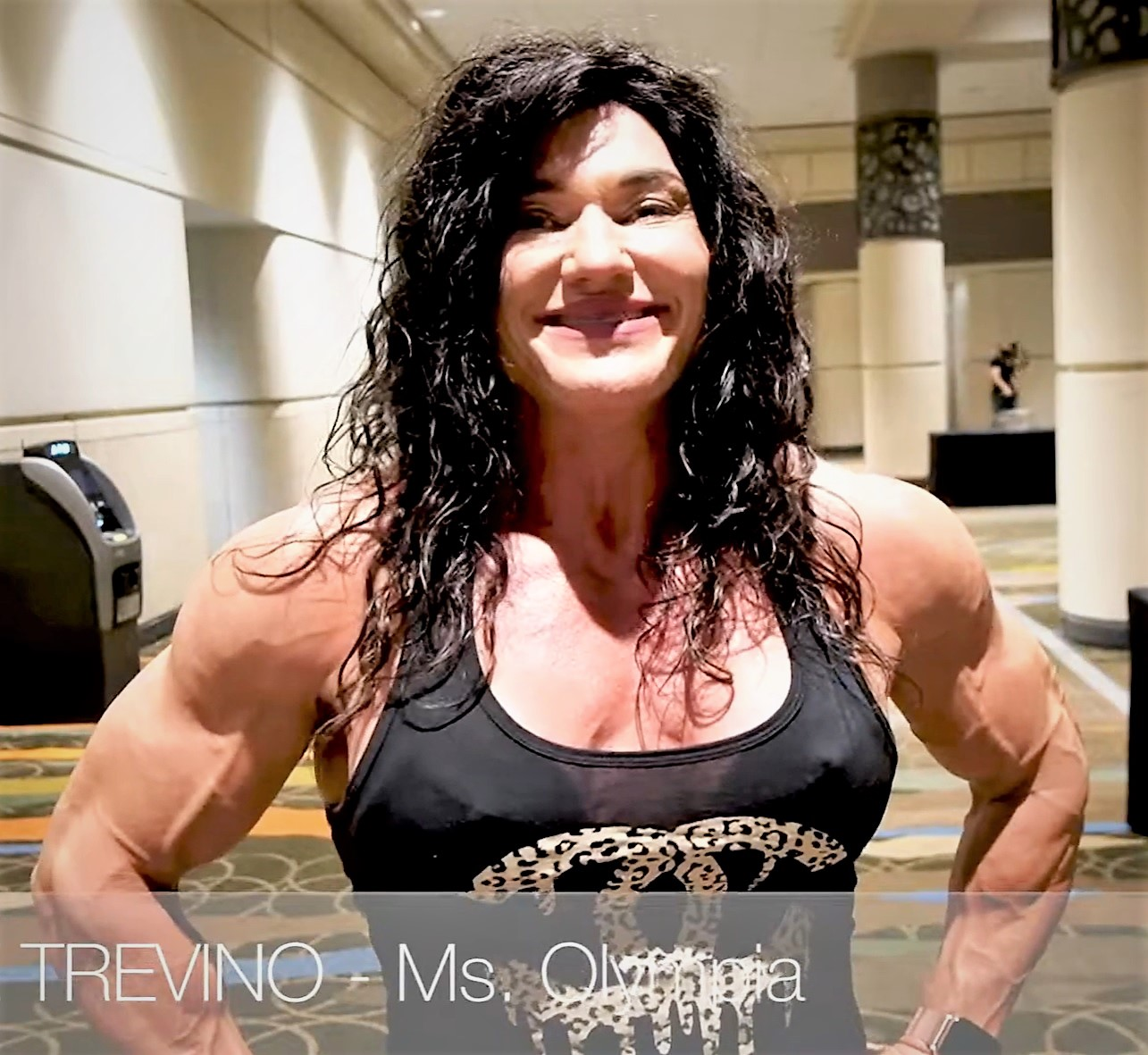
- Trevino discusses Ms. Olympia in 2020

Personal info
- Nickname: Beastqueen, Danish Dynamite and Quadmachine
- Born: Sønderborg, Denmark

Best statistics
- Height: 5 ft 5 in (1.65 m)
- Weight: In Season: 157–170 lb (71–77 kg); Off-Season: 180 lb (82 kg)

Professional (Pro) career
- Pro-debut: IFBB Jan Tana Classic; 2003
- Best win: Rising Phoenix World Championships, 2017, 2019
- Predecessor: Margie Marvelous; Alina Popa
- Successor: Alina Popa; Andrea Shaw
- Active: Since 1992

Helle Trevino (née Nielsen) is a Danish professional female bodybuilder and the title winner of the 2017 and the 2019 Rising Phoenix World Championships.

== Early life and education ==
Helle Nielsen was born and raised in rural Sønderborg, Denmark. She grew up on a farm. She majored in English and German in college. After that she continued her way into the fitness industry where she took a number of exams within the nutrition and training field. She was a gymnast from the age of three and competed in various other sports, including ballroom dancing, swimming, track and field, shot put, martial arts, horse-riding, boxing, biking, ballet and yoga.

== Bodybuilding career ==
=== Amateur ===
At the age of 17, a friend invited Helle to a powerlifting competition at a local gym. She was fascinated by muscles and the weights the powerlifters could lift. Inspired by Kim Chizevsky-Nicholls, she started her career in bodybuilding at that gym and trained there for five years. She started training seven days a week. She meet one bodybuilder at her gym and he agreed to make a diet for her. When she started she weighed 128 lb (58 kg) and within a year of training she had added 20 lb (9.1 kg) of muscle and wanted more.

Helle quickly realized she had great genetics for bodybuilding. She attended the Danish Championships in Copenhagen, had gone through the program of contestants and where they came from. She noticed that there were 12 bodybuilders competing from the same gym. She went home, packed, moved to Copenhagen and joined that gym. After 7 months, she competed at her first bodybuilding contest, the 1998 Danish Championships, and won her first title. She also won the overall and heavyweight title at the Scandinavian Championships in the same year. In 1999, she competed at the World Championships in Australia.

=== Professional ===
==== 2003-2010 ====
Trevino became the first professional female bodybuilder from Denmark since Lisser Frost-Larsen, who had last competed in 1984. In her pro debut, she won the heavyweight and overall at the 2003 Jan Tana Classic. A few months later, she placed fifth in the heavyweights at the Ms. Olympia.

==== From 2011 ====
After spending a few years building up her personal training business, Trevino in 2011 won the FIBO pro show and placed 11th at the 2011 Ms. Olympia. The following year she placed 12th in the Ms. Olympia competition, where. In 2012, she moved from Denmark to California, to train at the Gold's Gym in Venice. In 2015, Helle won her third pro show, the 2015 Chicago Pro and qualified for the 2015 Rising Phoenix World Championships. At the 2015 Rising Phoenix World Championships, due to the retirement of Iris Kyle, along with Alina Popa not competing due to injuries, Helle was able to surpass much more seasoned professional bodybuilders, such as Yaxeni Oriquen-Garcia and Debi Laszewski, and placed 2nd. At the 2016 Rising Phoenix World Championships, she placed 4th.

At the 2017 Rising Phoenix World Championships, with Maggie Martin not attending to defend her title, both Helle and Sheila Bleck were both tied and the tie was broken by the final round due to Helle receiving a score of 4 and Sheila receiving a score of 5.Thus Helle was able to win her first Ms. Rising Phoenix title, making her the top female bodybuilder in the world at the time. At the 2018 Rising Phoenix World Championships, Helle was dethroned by dethroned by Alina Popa and placed 5th. At the 2019 Tampa Pro, she got 1st place. At the 2019 Rising Phoenix World Championships, with Alina retired and not defending her title, she won her second Ms. Rising Phoenix title, beating former champion Margaret Martin. At the 2020 Rising Phoenix World Championships, she was dethroned a second time, this time by dark horse contestant Andrea Shaw. At the 2020 Ms. Olympia, Helle would place 3rd.

At the 2021 Rising Phoenix World Championships, Helle would again place 2nd to Andrea Shaw. At the 2021 Ms. Olympia, Helle would place 2nd, her best showing at a Ms. Olympia to date. Due to an injury, she could not attend the 2022 Rising Phoenix World Championships, the first Rising Phoenix World Championships she would not attend. At the 2022 Ms. Olympia, Helle would place 3rd. She would take the year of 2023 off and plans on competing again in 2024 and announced her coach for 2024 would be David DeMesquita, amateur men's physique contestant.

=== Contest history ===
- 1998 Danish Championships – 1st (HW and overall)
- 1998 Scandinavian Championships – 1st (HW and overall)
- 1999 World Amateur Championships – 10th (HW)
- 2003 IFBB Jan Tana Classic – 1st (HW and overall)
- 2003 IFBB Ms. Olympia – 5th (HW)
- 2011 IFBB FIBO Power Pro Germany – 1st
- 2011 IFBB Ms. Olympia – 14th
- 2012 IFBB Europa Battle of Champions Hartford – 9th
- 2012 IFBB WOS Chicago Pro-Am Extravaganza – 2nd
- 2012 IFBB Ms. Olympia –12th
- 2013 IFBB PBW Tampa Pro – 5th
- 2014 IFBB Omaha Pro – 7th
- 2015 IFBB WOS Chicago Pro – 1st
- 2015 IFBB Pro League WOS Rising Phoenix Pro Women's Bodybuilding – 2nd
- 2016 IFBB Pro League WOS Rising Phoenix Pro Women's Bodybuilding – 4th
- 2017 IFBB Pro League WOS Rising Phoenix Pro Women's Bodybuilding – 1st
- 2018 IFBB Pro League WOS Rising Phoenix Pro Women's Bodybuilding – 5th
- 2019 Tampa Pro – 1st
- 2019 IFBB Pro League WOS Rising Phoenix Pro Women's Bodybuilding – 1st
- 2020 IFBB Pro League WOS Rising Phoenix Pro Women's Bodybuilding – 2nd
- 2020 IFBB WOS Ms. Olympia – 3rd
- 2021 IFBB Pro League WOS Rising Phoenix Pro Women's Bodybuilding – 2nd
- 2021 IFBB WOS Ms. Olympia – 2nd
- 2022 Ms. Olympia – 3rd

=== Best statistics ===
- Arms – 17 inches (43 cm)
- Back-width – 45 3/10 inches (115 cm)
- Biceps:
  - Left bicep – 16 1/4 inches (41 cm)
  - Right bicep – 16 inches (41 cm)
- Calves – 17 3/4 inches (45 cm)
- Forearms – 12 1/2 inches (32 cm)
- Height – 5 ft 5 in (165 cm)
- On season weight – 157–170 lb (71–77 kg)
- Quads – 27 1/2 inches (70 cm)
- Shoulder-width – 52 3/10 inches (133 cm)

== Personal life ==
As of 2014, Trevino lived in Los Angeles, California, and worked as a personal trainer in Venice, California. She speaks Danish, English, and German. She worked as a caretaker of disabled people for 15 years. In 2008, she became the CEO and Founder of the company Team Evolution.

== See also ==
- Female bodybuilding
- List of female professional bodybuilders
