= 2019 Rising Phoenix World Championships =

- Promotion: IFBB; Wings of Strength
- Date: September 6, 2019 - September 7, 2019
- City: Wild Horse Pass Hotel & Casino, Chandler, Arizona

Event chronology
2018	2019 Rising Phoenix World Championships	2020

The 2019 Rising Phoenix World Championships was an IFBB Wings of Strength female professional bodybuilding competition and held in conjunction with the IFBB Arizona Pro and NPC Arizona Women's Extravaganza. It was held on September 6, 2019 to September 7, 2019 at the Wild Horse Pass Hotel & Casino in Chandler, Arizona.

== Results ==
=== Overall results ===
- 1st - Helle Trevino
- 2nd - Margaret Martin
- 3rd - Irene Andersen
- 4th - Nicole Chartrand
- 5th - Monique Jones
- 6th - Theresa Ivancik
- 7th - Andrea Shaw
- 8th - Janeen Lankowski
- 9th - Mona Poursaleh
- 10th - Aleesha Young
- 11th - Silvia Matta
- 12th - Kim Buck
- 13th - Pauline Nelson
- 14th - Jessica Martin
- 15th - Barbara Carita
- 16th - Robin Hillis
- 16th - Susanna Jacobs
- 16th - Kristina Mendoza
- 16th - Tina Williams

Comparison to previous Rising Phoenix World Championships results:

- +2 - Alina Popa
- -1 - Margaret Martin
- -1 - Sheila Bleck
- +8 - Nicole Chartrand
- -4 - Helle Trevino
- -2 - Virginia Sanchez
- +4 - Maria Mikola
- +1 - Jacqueline Fuchs
- -10 - Wendy McCready
- Same - Cristina Franzoso
- Same - Pauline Nelson
- Same - Angela Rayburn
- -3 - Isabelle Turell

==== Scorecard ====
No	Name	Country	Judging	Finals	Total	Place
1	Irene Anderson	Sweden	9	10	19	3
2	Kim Buck	(United States) Jonesboro, Georgia	36	36	72	12
3	Barbara Carita	Italy	45	44	89	15
4	Nicki Chartrand	Canada	12	11	23	4
5	Robin Hillis	Ontario, Canada	48	48	96	16
6	Theresa Ivancik	(United States) Butler, Pennsylvania	19	17	36	6
7	Susanna Jacobs	(United States) Woodland Hills, California	48	48	96	16
8	Monique Jones	(United States) Simpsonville, South Carolina	15	16	31	5
9	Janeen Lankowski	(United States) Tampa, Florida	24	24	48	8
10	Jessica Martin	(United States) Portland, Oregon	42	42	84	14
11	Margie Martin	(United States) Atlanta, Georgia	6	6	12	2
12	Silvia Matta	Italy	32	33	65	11
13	Kristina Mendoza	(United States) Las Vegas, Nevada	48	48	96	16
14	Pauline Nelson	(United States) Brooklyn, New York	39	39	78	13
15	Mona Poursaleh	Canada	27	26	53	9
16	Andrea Shaw	(United States) Clinton Township, Michigan	20	22	42	7
17	Helle Trevino	(United States) Venice, California	3	3	6	1
18	Tina Williams	(United States) Lawrence, Kansas	48	48	96	16
19	Aleesha Young	(United States) Lehi, Utah	31	30	61	10

=== Best poser results ===
- 1st - Mona Poursaleh
- 2nd - Janeen Lankowski
- 3rd - Nicole Chartrand
- 4th - Kristina Mendoza
- 5th - Theresa Ivancik

Comparison to previous Rising Phoenix World Championships results:

- -1 - Sheila Bleck
- Same - Pauline Nelson

=== Best intro results ===
- 1st - Silvia Matta
- 2nd - Alesha Young
- 3rd - Nicki Chartrand

=== Most muscular winner ===
- Winner - Aleesha Young

Comparison to previous Rising Phoenix World Championships results:

- +1 - Helle Trevino
- -1 - Aleesha Young

== Prize money ==
=== Overall award prize money ===
- 1st - $50,000 + $100,000 brand-new top of the line iconic American prize vehicle
- 2nd - $25,000
- 3rd - $12,500
- 4th - $7,500
- 5th - $5,000

Total: $100,000 + $100,000 Dodge Challenger Hellcat

=== Best poser award prize money ===
This award was sponsored by Elevation Solar and MuscleGirlzLive.

- 1st - $5,000 and an all-expense-paid trip to the 2019 Olympia
- 2nd - $2,500 and an all-expense-paid trip to the 2019 Olympia
- 3rd - $1,500 and an all-expense-paid trip to the 2019 Olympia
- 4th - An all-expense-paid trip to the 2019 Olympia
- 5th - An all-expense-paid trip to the 2019 Olympia

Total: $9,000

=== Best intro video award prize money ===
This award was sponsored by Offerpad.com and HerBiceps.

- 1st - $5,000
- 2nd - $2,000
- 3rd - $1,500

Total: $8,000

=== Most muscular award prize money ===
This award was sponsored by Muscle Angels and x2x.

Total: $7,000

== 2019 Rising Phoenix World Championships Qualified ==
Name	Country	How Qualified
Alina Popa	(Romania)	2018 Rising Phoenix World Championships - 1st
Margaret Martin	(United States)	2018 Rising Phoenix World Championships - 2nd
Sheila Bleck	(United States)	2018 Rising Phoenix World Championships - 3rd
Nicole Chartrand	(Canada)	2018 Rising Phoenix World Championships - 4th
Helle Trevino	(Denmark)	2018 Rising Phoenix World Championships - 5th
Monique Jones	(United States)	2018 Romania Muscle Fest Pro Women's Bodybuilding - 1st
Jessica Martin	(United States)	2019 WOS Yamamoto Nutrition IFBB Puerto Rico Women's Bodybuilding - 1st
Vera Mikulcova	(Czech Republic)	2019 IFBB Toronto Pro Supershow Women's Bodybuilding - 2nd
Michelle Jin	(United States)	2019 IFBB Omaha Pro Women's Bodybuilding - 2nd
Aleesha Young	(United States)	2019 IFBB WOS Chicago Pro Women's Bodybuilding - 1st
Theresa Ivancik	(United States)	2019 IFBB Lenda Murray Pro Women's Bodybuilding - 1st
Pauline Nelson	(United States)	WOS 2019 IFBB Yamamoto Nutrition Tampa Pro Women's Bodybuilding - 2nd

=== Points standings ===
Ranking^{1}	Name	Country	Points
1	Janeen Lankowski	(United States)	10
2	Tina Williams	(United States)	7
2	Susanna Jacobs	(United States)	7
3	Silvia Matta	(Italy)	6
3	Marla Merrithew	(United States)	6
4	Irene Andersen	(Sweden)	5
4	Andrea Shaw	(United States)	5
4	LaDawn McDay	(United States)	5
5	Robin Hillis	(Canada)	4
5	Kim Buck	(United States)	4
5	Mona Poursaleh	(Canada)	4
5	Barbra Carita	(Italy)	4
5	Michaela Aycock	(United States)	4
6	Elena Hreapca	(Romania)	3
7	Tara Silzer	(United States)	2
7	Tananarive Huie	(Canada)	2
7	Lauren Hanford	(United States)	2
8	Jana Bendova	(Czech Republic)	1
8	Claudia Partenza	(Italy)	1
8	Leah Dennie	(United States)	1
8	Jennifer Kennedy	(United States)	1
8	Angela Rayburn	(United States)	1

^{1} In the event of a tie, the competitor with the best top five contest placings will be awarded the qualification. If both competitors have the same contest placings, than both will qualify for the Rising Phoenix World Championships.

== See also ==
- 2019 Mr. Olympia
