= 2016 Rising Phoenix World Championships =

- Promotion: IFBB; Wings of Strength
- Date: September 10, 2016
- Venue: Talking Stick Resort
- City: (United States) Scottsdale, Arizona

Event chronology
2015	2016 Rising Phoenix World Championships	2017

The 2016 Rising Phoenix World Championships was an IFBB Wings of Strength female professional bodybuilding competition and held in conjunction with the IFBB Arizona Pro. It was held on September 10, 2016 at the Talking Stick Resort in Scottsdale, Arizona.

== Call outs ==
=== Prejudging ===
- 1st - Margaret Martin, Sheila Bleck, Alina Popa, Helle Trevino
- 2nd - Helle Trevino, Yaxeni Oriquen-Garcia, Kim Buck, Lisa Cross, Irene Andersen
- 3rd - Lisa Cross, Irene Andersen, Nancy Clark, Maria Bello, Angela Rayburn
- 4th - Jacqueline Fuchs, Lora Ottenad, Amanda Aivaliotis, Laura Carolan
- 5th - Isabelle Turell, Lora Ottenad, Amanda Aivaliotis, Laura Carolan, Alana Shipp
- 6th - Margaret Martin, Sheila Bleck, Alina Popa, Helle Trevino

== Prize money ==
- 1st - $50,000 + $65,000 Jeep

== Results ==
=== Overall results ===
- 1st - Margaret Martin
- 2nd - Sheila Bleck
- 3rd - Alina Popa
- 4th - Helle Trevino
- 5th - Yaxeni Oriquen-Garcia
- 6th - Kim Buck
- 7th - Lisa Cross
- 8th - Irene Andersen
- 9th - Nancy Clark
- 10th - Maria Bello
- 11th - Angela Rayburn
- 12th - Jacqueline Fuchs
- 13th - Isabelle Turell
- 14th - Silvia Matta
- 15th - Lora Ottenad
- 16th - Amanda Aivaliotis
- 16th - Laura Carolan
- 16th - Alana Shipp

Comparison to previous Rising Phoenix World Championships results:

- Same - Margaret Martin
- -2 - Helle Trevino
- -1 - Yaxeni Oriquen-Garcia
- +2 - Lisa Cross
- +6 - Irene Andersen
- -2 - Maria Bello
- -6 - Isabelle Turtle
- -11 - Alana Shipp

==== Scorecard ====
No	Name	Country	Judging	Finals	Total	Place
1	Amanda Aivaliotis	Ontario, Canada	75	75	150	16
2	Irene Andersen	Sweden	49	49	98	8
3	Maria Rita Bello	Argentina	50	50	100	10
4	Sheila Bleck	(United States) Florida, USA	11	11	22	2
5	Kim Buck	(United States) Georgia, USA	28	28	56	6
6	Larua Carolan	Manitoba, Canada	74	74	148	16
7	Nanacy Clark	British Columbia, Canada	49	49	98	9
8	Lisa Cross	United Kingdom	39	39	78	7
9	Jacqueline Fuchs	Switzerland	60	60	120	12
10	Margie Martin	(United States) Georgia, USA	5	5	10	1
11	Silvia Matta	Italy	73	73	146	14
12	Yaxeni Oriquen	(Venezuela) Miami, Florida	27	27	54	5
13	Lora Ottenad	(United States) Nevada, USA	73	73	146	15
14	Alina Popa	Romania	14	14	28	3
15	Angela Rayburn	(United States) Mississippi, USA	54	54	108	11
16	Alana Shipp	(United States) Virginia, USA	78	78	156	16
17	Helle Trevino	Denmark	20	20	40	4
18	Isabelle Turell	(United States) Indiana, USA	61	61	122	13

=== Best poser winner ===
- Winner - Sheila Bleck

Comparison to previous Rising Phoenix World Championships results:

- +1 - Sheila Bleck
- -1 - Margaret Martin

== 2016 Rising Phoenix World Championships Qualified ==
Name	Country	How Qualified
Margie Martin	(United States)	2015 Rising Phoenix World Championships - 1st
Helle Trevino	(Denmark)	2015 Rising Phoenix World Championships - 2nd
Debi Laszewski	(United States)	2015 Rising Phoenix World Championships - 3rd
Yaxeni Oriquen-Garcia	(Venezuela)	2015 Rising Phoenix World Championships - 4th
Alana Shipp	(Israel)	2015 Rising Phoenix World Championships - 5th
Kim Buck	(United States)	2016 Puerto Rico Pro - 1st
Alina Popa	(Switzerland)	Special invite
Laura Carolan	(Canada)	2016 Toronto Pro Supershow - 1st
Isabelle Turrell	(Canada)	2016 Omaha Pro - 1st
Jacqueline Fuchs	(Switzerland)	2016 Chicago Pro - 1st
Sheila Bleck	(United States)	2016 PBW Tampa Pro - 1st
Angela Rayburn	(United States)	2016 Omaha Pro - 3rd 2016 Chicago Pro - 2nd
Nancy Clark	(Canada)	2016 Toronto Pro Supershow - 2nd 2016 Lenda Murray Pro AM - 3rd
Lora Ottenad	(United States)	2016 Lenda Murray Pro AM - 2nd
Lisa Cross	(United Kingdom)	2016 PBW Tampa Pro - 2nd
Amanda Aivaliotis	(Canada)	2016 Omaha Pro - 4th
Bonnie Switzer-Pappas	(United States)	2016 Chicago Pro - 3rd
Catherine LeFrançois	(Canada)	2016 Toronto Pro Supershow - 3rd
Rita Bello	(Argentina)	2016 PBW Tampa Pro - 3rd
Irene Anderson	(Sweden)	Special invite
Silvia Matta	(Italy)	Special invite
Iris Kyle	(United States)	Special invite

=== Points standings ===
Ranking^{1}	Name	Country	Points
1	Angela Rayburn	(United States)	7
2	Nancy Clark	(Canada)	7
3	Lora Ottenad	(United States)	4
3	Lisa Cross	(United Kingdom)	4
4	Amanda Aivaliotis	(Canada)	3
4	Bonnie Switzer-Pappas	(United States)	3
4	Catherine LeFrançois	(Canada)	3
4	Rita Bello	(Argentina)	3
5	Irene Andersen	(Sweden)	2
5	Silvia Matta	(Italy)	2
5	Robin Hillis	(Canada)	2
5	Judy Gaillard	(United States)	2
5	Kimberly McGuire	(United States)	2
5	Selma Labat	(Brazil)	2
6	Jana Bendova	(Czech Republic)	1
6	Rene Campbell	(United States)	1
6	Tischa Thomas	(United States)	1

^{1} In the event of a tie, the competitor with the best top five contest placings will be awarded the qualification. If both competitors have the same contest placings, than both will qualify for the Rising Phoenix World Championships.

== Attended ==
- 2nd Rising Phoenix World Championships attended - Margaret Martin, Helle Trevino, Yaxeni Oriquen-Garcia, Lisa Cross, Irene Andersen, Maria Bello, Isabelle Turell, and Alana Shipp
- 1st Rising Phoenix World Championships attended - Sheila Bleck, Alina Popa, Kim Buck, Nancy Clark, Angela Rayburn, Jacqueline Fuchs, Lora Ottenad, Amanda Aivaliotis, Laura Carolan, and Silvia Matta
- Previous year Olympia attendees who did not attend - Debi Laszewski, Aleesha Young, Christine Envall, Shawna Strong, Virginia Sanchez, Monique Jones, and Gillian Kovack

== Notable events ==
- This was Margaret Martin's 2nd Ms Rising Phoenix overall award win.
- This was Sheila Bleck's 1st Ms Rising Phoenix best poser award win.
- On September 25, 2015, in an interview with Dave Palumbo, Kyle announced she will be coming out of retirement to compete at the 2016 Wings of Strength Rising Phoenix World Championships. Although Iris Kyle stated she wanted to compete at the 2016 Wings of Strength Rising Phoenix World Championships, the IFBB told her that she needed to either win the 2015 Puerto Rico Pro, 2015 Toronto Pro Supershow, the 2015 Omaha Pro, the 2016 Chicago Pro, the 2016 Lenda Murray Pro AM, and the 2016 PBW Tampa Pro, or be one of the top 7 IFBB female bodybuilders to accumulative points implementing the IFBB Tier 4 point system. Iris was angered at the IFBB, stating that she was entitled to compete for the fact she is the most successful bodybuilder, male or female, ever. Iris said that she was offered to do some work with them that she doesn't "agree with", but declined the offer. While the IFBB did later allow her a special invite to the 2016 Wings of Strength Rising Phoenix World Championships, she declined to compete, instead focusing on training her boyfriend, Hidetada Yamagishi, for the 2017 Arnold Classic Men's Physique and focusing on their business venture.
- Debi Laszewski, Bonnie Switzer-Pappas, and Catherine LeFrançois qualified but did not attend the 2016 Rising Phoenix World Championships.
- The 2016 Rising Phoenix World Championships was featured in was featured in season 1, episode 2 of Vice Sports' documentary SWOLE in the episode called The Last of the Iron Sisters.

== See also ==
- 2016 Mr. Olympia
- 2015 Rising Phoenix World Championships
