= Margaret V. Martin =

American professional bodybuilder

Margie Martin
- Professional bodybuilder

Personal info
- Nickname: The Marvelous One
- Born: February 7, 1979 (age 47); Atlanta, Georgia, U.S.

Best statistics
- Height: 5 ft 5 in (165 cm)
- Weight: In Season: 155–178 lb (70–81 kg)

Professional (Pro) career
- Pro-debut: IFBB Toronto Pro Supershow; 2014
- Best win: IFBB WOS Rising Phoenix World Championships overall champion; 2015 and 2016
- Predecessor: None
- Successor: Helle Trevino
- Active: Retired 2022

Margie V. Martin (née Margaret Virginia Smith; born February 7, 1979), nicknamed "The Marvelous One", is an American professional female bodybuilder. She is the first Ms Rising Phoenix of the 2015 and the 2016 IFBB Wings of Strength Rising Phoenix World Championships.

== U.S. Marine Corps career ==
At the age of 17, Martin entered the Marine Corps, like her father before her. During her time in the Marines, she reached the rank of sergeant. She remained in the Marines until 2007.

== U.S. Department of Defense career ==
From November 2007 to April 2009, Martin worked in Urasoe-shi, Okinawa, Japan, as a Human Resource Specialist for the U.S. Department of Defense.

== Bodybuilding career ==
=== Amateur career ===
Martin as a little girl wanted to be a bodybuilder. Her first introduction to bodybuilding came early on when she met Lee Haney at her local church. She asked him what she needed to do to become a bodybuilder. Her mother and father loved to work out. She used to watch the women of GLOW and American Gladiators wishing she could become like them. What inspired her growing up was She-Ra from She-Ra: Princess of Power or Tigress from ThunderCats.

At the age of 13, Martin started weight training for the first time during the summer. In high school the school had a bodybuilding class where she was the only female in the class. In 2007, she started thinking about competing in bodybuilding for the first time after losing weight after trying to work out so hard after several years after having her son as an unwed mother. People started telling her to do a local bodybuilding show. She didn't know how to diet, so she only ate canned tuna and string beans for almost six weeks. She placed 5th in her first competition, the Far East Armed Forces Bodybuilding Competition in Okinawa, Japan.

In August 2012, Martin was named NPC's August 2012 Athlete of the Month. was At the 2013 NPC USA Championships, she placed 1st in heavyweight category and overall, thus winning her IFBB pro card.

=== Professional career ===
In 2014, Martin made her IFBB pro debut at the 2014 IFBB Toronto Pro Supershow, where she placed 4th. At the 2014 IFBB Omaha Pro, she placed 2nd. She qualified for her first IFBB Ms. Olympia, the 2014 IFBB Ms. Olympia, where she placed 10th. In 2015, she competed at five IFBB competitions. At the 2015 IFBB Omaha Pro, she won 7th place and won the best poser award. At the 2015 IFBB Toronto Pro Supershow, she placed 5th. At the 2015 IFBB Wings of Strength Chicago Pro, she placed 8th and won the best poser award. At the 2015 IFBB Wings of Strength PBW Tampa Pro, she won 1st place, her first IFBB pro win ever, and qualified for the 2015 IFBB Wings of Strength Rising Phoenix World Championships. At the 2015 IFBB Wings of Strength Rising Phoenix World Championships, she won the first Ms Rising Phoenix title and best poser award, becoming the de facto successor of Iris Kyle. At the 2016 IFBB Wings of Strength Rising Phoenix World Championships, she won her second title in a row, but failed to win the best poser award. Her coach was P. D. Dever.

At the 2017 Rising Phoenix World Championships, Margie did not attend, allowing Helle Trevino to win the title. Next year, she went on to win the 2018 Toronto Pro Supershow, but came in 2nd to Alina Popa at the 2018 Rising Phoenix World Championships. In 2019, Margie went on to win the 2019 Toronto Pro and 2019 Omaha Pro, but at the 2019 Rising Phoenix World Championships, Margie came in 2nd place to Helle. She would cease attending future Rising Phoenix World Championships going forward in order to focus on the Ms. Olympia.

At the 2020 Ms. Olympia, Margie came in 2nd place to dark horse Andrea Shaw, who had just come off her win at the 2020 Rising Phoenix World Championships. At the 2021 Ms. Olympia, Margie came in 3rd place, with Helle taking 2nd place. At the 2022 Ms. Olympia, Margie announced at the contest that this would be her final contest and after this she would retire from professional bodybuilding. She came in 4th place at the 2022 Ms. Olympia, with Angela Yeo coming in 2nd place and Helle coming in 3rd place.

=== Contest history ===
- 2007 Far East Armed Forces Bodybuilding Competition – 5th
- 2012 NPC Nationals – 9th (LHW)
- 2012 NPC Los Angeles Championships – 11th
- 2012 NPC Pacific USA XVIII Championships – 1st
- 2013 NPC USA Championships – 1st (HW and overall)
- 2014 IFBB Toronto Pro Supershow – 4th
- 2014 IFBB Omaha Pro – 2nd
- 2014 IFBB Ms. Olympia – 10th
- 2015 IFBB Omaha Pro – 7th and best poser award
- 2015 IFBB Toronto Pro Supershow – 5th
- 2015 IFBB Wings of Strength Chicago Pro – 8th and best poser award
- 2015 IFBB Wings of Strength PBW Tampa Pro – 1st
- 2015 IFBB Pro League WOS Rising Phoenix Pro Women's Bodybuilding – 1st and best poser award
- 2016 IFBB Pro League WOS Rising Phoenix Pro Women's Bodybuilding – 1st
- 2018 IFBB Toronto Pro Supershow – 1st
- 2018 IFBB Pro League WOS Rising Phoenix Pro Women's Bodybuilding - 2nd
- 2019 IFBB Toronto Pro Women's Bodybuilding - 1st
- 2019 IFBB Omaha Pro Women's Bodybuilding - 1st
- 2019 IFBB Pro League WOS Rising Phoenix Pro Women's Bodybuilding - 2nd
- 2020 IFBB WOS Ms. Olympia - 2nd
- 2021 IFBB WOS Ms. Olympia - 3rd
- 2022 IFBB WOS Ms. Olympia - 4th

=== Best statistics ===
- Biceps - 15 1/2 inches (39 cm)
- On season weight - 155–178 lb (70–81 kg)
