= 2015 Rising Phoenix World Championships =

2015
- Promotion: IFBB; Wings of Strength
- Date: August 22, 2015
- Venue: Grand Hyatt
- City: (United States) San Antonio, Texas

Event chronology
None	2015	2016

The 2015 Rising Phoenix World Championships was an IFBB Wings of Strength female professional bodybuilding competition and held in conjunction with the IFBB Texas Pro, the NPC Tim Gardner Texas Extravaganza, and NPC National. It was held on August 20, 2015 to August 22, 2015, at the Grand Hyatt, in San Antonio, Texas, United States.

== Call outs ==
=== Prejudging ===
- 1st - Debi Laszewski, Margaret Martin, Yaxeni Oriquen-Garcia, Alana Shipp, and Helle Trevino
- 2nd - Monique Jones, Shawna Strong, Isabelle Turell, Aleesha Young, Maria Bello, and Lisa Cross
- 3rd - Irene Andersen, Christine Envall, Gillian Kovack, Virginia Sanchez, and Shawna Strong
- 4th - Margaret Martin, Helle Trevino, and Debi Laszewski

=== Confirmation round ===
- 1st - Debi Laszewski, Margaret Martin, Helle Trevino, and Yaxeni Oriquen-Garcia (Yaxeni Oriquen-Garcia and Helle Trevino switched places)
- 2nd - Isabelle Turell, Alana Shipp, Aleesha Young, and Maria Bello (Alana Shipp and Isabelle Turell switched places)
- 3rd - Irene Andersen, Monique Jones, Christine Envall, Lisa Cross, Shawna Strong, Virginia Sanchez, and Gillian Kovack (Lisa Cross and Monique Jones switched places; Gillian Kovack and Shawna Strong switched places)
- 4th - Debi Laszewski, Yaxeni Oriquen-Garcia, Margaret Martin, and Helle Trevino

== Prize money ==
- 1st $50,000 + Jeep
- 2nd $25,000
- 3rd $12,500
- 4th $7,000
- 5th $5,000

Total: $99,500 + Jeep

== Results ==
=== Overall results ===
- 1st - Margaret Martin
- 2nd - Helle Trevino
- 3rd - Debi Laszewski
- 4th - Yaxeni Oriquen-Garcia
- 5th - Alana Shipp
- 6th - Aleesha Young
- 7th - Isabelle Turell
- 8th - Maria Bello
- 9th - Lisa Cross
- 10th - Christine Envall
- 11th - Shawna Strong
- 12th - Virginia Sanchez
- 13th - Monique Jones
- 14th - Irene Andersen
- 15th - Gillian Kovack

==== Scorecard ====
No	Name	Country	Judging	Finals	Total	Place
1	Irene Andersen	Sweden	70	68	138	14
2	Lisa Cross	United Kingdom	49	49	98	9
3	Christine Envall	Queensland, Australia	59	49	108	10
4	Monique Jones	(United States) Greer, South Carolina	50	67	117	13
5	Gillian Kovack	(Canada) Toronto, Ontario	75	75	150	15
6	Debi Laszewski	(United States) Jupiter, Florida	15	15	30	3
7	Margie Martin	(United States) Temecula, California	5	5	10	1
8	Yaxeni Oriquen	(Venezuela) Miami, Florida	21	20	41	4
9	Virginia Sanchez	Madrid, Spain	60	56	116	12
10	Alana Shipp	(Israel) Hutto, Texas	24	25	49	5
11	Shawna Strong	(United States) Phoenix, Arizona	56	55	111	11
12	Helle Trevino	(Denmark) Venice, California	10	10	20	2
13	Isabelle Turell	(United States) Terre Haute, Indiana	35	36	71	7
14	Aleesha Young	(United States) Lehi, Utah	30	30	60	6
15	Rita Bello	Argentina	40	39	79	8

=== Best poser winner ===
- Winner - Margaret Martin

== Notable events ==
- Due to injuries, Alina Popa stated in an interview that she will attend, but not participate in the 2015 Wings of Strength Rising Phoenix World Championships.
- This is the first year since 1998 that Iris Kyle would not attend an IFBB professional bodybuilding competition of that particular year due to her retirement from the sport.
- The first competition was held on Iris Kyle's 41st birthday.
- Both Vera Mikulcova and Jana Bendova qualified, but did not attend.
- One of the two emcees was Lenda Murray.
- All of the competitors received a rose after individual posing.
- All 15 competitors did the posedown.
- The IFBB professional women's bodybuilding cash prize for first place was five times that of the IFBB professional men's bodybuilding first place cash prize.

== 2015 Rising Phoenix World Championships Qualified ==
Name	Country	How Qualified
Iris Kyle	(United States)	2014 Ms. Olympia 1st
Alina Popa	(Romania)	2014 Ms. Olympia 2nd
Debi Laszewski	(United States)	2014 Ms. Olympia 3rd
Alana Shipp	(United States)	2014 Ms. Olympia 4th 2015 PBW Tampa Pro 2nd
Yaxeni Oriquen-Garcia	(Venezuela)	2014 Ms. Olympia 5th
Lisa Cross	(United Kingdom)	2015 Omaha Pro 1st
Christine Envall	(Australia)	2015 Omaha Pro 3rd 2015 Toronto Pro Supershow 1st
Helle Trevino	(Denmark)	2015 Chicago Pro-Am Extravaganza 1st
Margie Martin	(United States)	2015 Chicago Pro-Am Extravaganza 4th 2015 PBW Tampa Pro 1st
Isabelle Turell	(United States)	2015 Chicago Pro-Am Extravaganza 4th 2015 PBW Tampa Pro 3rd
Monique Jones	(United States)	2015 Omaha Pro 2nd
Vera Mikulcova	(Czech Republic)	2015 Toronto Pro Supershow 2nd
Gillian Kovack	(Canada)	2015 Omaha Pro 4th 2015 Toronto Pro Supershow 4th
Maria Bello	(Argentina)	2015 Chicago Pro-Am Extravaganza 2nd
Jana Bendova	(Czech Republic)	2015 Toronto Pro Supershow 3rd
Virginia Sanchez	(Spain)	2015 Chicago Pro-Am Extravaganza 3rd
Aleesha Young	(United States)	Special invite
Shawna Strong	(United States)	Special invite
Irene Andersen	(Sweden)	Special invite

=== Points standings ===
Ranking^{1}	Name	Country	Points
1	Isabelle Turell	(United States)	5
2	Monique Jones	(United States)	4
2	Vera Mikulcova	(Czech Republic)	4
2	Maria Bello	(Argentina)	4
2	Gillian Kovack	(Canada)	4
2	Alana Shipp	(United States)	4
3	Christine Envall	(Australia)	3
3	Jana Bendova	(Czech Republic)	3
3	Virginia Sanchez	(Spain)	3
4	Angela Rayburn	(United States)	2
4	Keri Watkins	(United States)	2
5	Margie Martin	(United States)	1
5	Jacqueline Fuchs	(Switzerland)	1

^{1} In the event of a tie, the competitor with the best top five contest placings will be awarded the qualification. If both competitors have the same contest placings, than both will qualify for the Rising Phoenix World Championships.

== Pictures ==
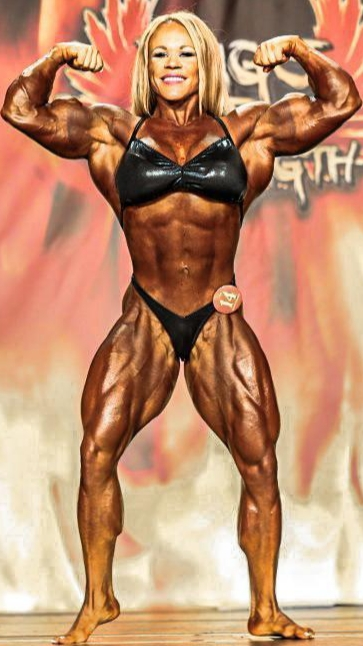

== See also ==
- 2015 Mr. Olympia
- 2016 Rising Phoenix World Championships
