= Jake Wood (bodybuilding) =

American bodybuilder

Jake Wood is owner of the Olympia Fitness & Performance Weekend, Wings of Strength, LLC, Muscle & Fitness, Flex, Hers Magazine and Digital Muscle.

== Bodybuilding ==
=== Wings of Strength ===
In 2011, Jake and Kristal Wood created the Wings of Strength, LLC. The stated goal of the organization is to organize professional bodybuilding contests for women bodybuilders to attend.

The organization is the promoter of the following International Federation of Bodybuilding and Fitness Professional League (IFBB Pro League) contests:

- Lenda Murray Atlanta Pro
- Masters Olympia
- Romania Muscle Fest Pro

The organization also sponsors the following IFBB Pro League contests:

- Atlantic Coast Pro
- Chicago Pro
- Hurricane Pro
- Joe Weider's Olympia Fitness & Performance Weekend
- Rising Phoenix World Championships
- Tampa Pro
