= The Dark Destroyer =

The Dark Destroyer is the nickname of:

- Nigel Benn (born 1964), British former professional boxer who competed from 1987 to 1996.
- Deta Hedman (born 1959), Jamaican-born English darts player.
- Monique Jones (born 1979), American professional female bodybuilder.
- Shaun Wallace (born 1960), English "Chaser" on the ITV quiz show The Chase, and barrister.
