= 2020 Rising Phoenix World Championships =

- Promotion: IFBB Professional League; Wings of Strength
- Date: 5 December 2020
- Venue: Talking Stick Resort
- City: Scottsdale, Arizona, United States of America

Event chronology
2019	2020 Rising Phoenix World Championships	2021

The 2020 Rising Phoenix World Championships was an IFBB Professional League Wings of Strength female professional bodybuilding competition that was held in conjunction with Arizona Women’s Pro and the NPC Wings of Strength Arizona Women’s Extravaganza. It was held on 5 December 2020 at the Talking Stick Resort in Scottsdale, Arizona, United States of America. It was the 6th Rising Phoenix World Championships to be held.

== Results ==
=== Scorecard ===
No	Name	Country	Judging	Finals	Total	Place
1	Irene Anderson	Sweden	15		15	5
2	Nicki Chartrand	(United States) Bullhead City, Arizona	18		18	6
3	Patti Hanson	(United States) Sedro-Wooley, Washington	36		36	12
4	Theresa Ivancik	(United States) Butler, Pennsylvania	21		21	7
5	Monique Jones	(United States) Simpsonville, South Carolina	10		10	3
6	Janeen Lankowski	(United States) Tampa, Florida	31		31	10
7	LaDawn McDay	(United States) Detroit, Michigan	24		24	8
8	Yaxeni Oriquen	(United States) Miami, Florida	27		27	9
9	Mona Poursaleh	Canada	32		32	11
10	Andrea Shaw	(United States) Clinton Township, Michigan	3		3	1
11	Helle Trevino	(United States) Venice, California	6		6	2
12	Aleesha Young	(United States) Lehi, Utah	11		11	4

=== Best poser award ===
1st - Andrea Shaw

== Notable events ==
- Andrea Shaw, a dark horse competitor coming off her win at the 2020 Omaha Pro, dethroned reigning Ms. Rising Phoenix Helle Trevino and won her first Ms. Rising Phoenix title, along with the best poser award.
- Originally scheduled to be held on 5 September 2020 in Phoenix, Arizona, United States of America (USA), but due to the COVID-19 pandemic however it was rescheduled to 5 December 2020 in Las Vegas, Nevada, USA. The venue was later changed to Scottsdale, Arizona, USA due to COVID-19 restrictions on the capacity of audience attendance. This also lead to a massive decline in non-American residential competitors due to COVID-19 travel restrictions.
- This was the first Rising Phoenix World Championship to be demoted to the status as professional bodybuilding's 2nd most prestigious competition for female bodybuilding due to the restoration of the Ms. Olympia. Due to this change, it adopted a Ms. International style invitational application system, along with a Olympia Qualification System ranking on par with the Arnold Classic.

== Prize money ==
Ms. Rising Phoenix

- 1st - $50,000 & Chevrolet Camaro
- 2nd - $25,000

Best poser award

- 1st - $5,000

== Official competitors list ==
- Irene Anderson
- Jill Blondin
- Nicki Chartrand
- Patti Hanson
- Oana Hreapca
- Theresa Ivancik
- Monique Jones
- Natalia Kovaleva
- Janeen Lankowski
- Silvia Matta
- LaDawn McDay
- Kristina Mendoza
- Yaxeni Oriquen
- Mona Poursaleh
- Virginia Sanchez
- Andrea Shaw
- Helle Trevino
- Aleesha Young
- Margita Zamolova
