= 2022 Rising Phoenix World Championships =

Bodybuilding competition

- Promotion: Bikini Lab Hawaii; IFBB Professional League; Wings of Strength; Tim Gardner Productions
- Date: 5 November 2022
- Venue: Gila River Resorts & Casinos – Wild Horse Pass
- City: Chandler, Arizona, United States of America

Event chronology
2021	2022 Rising Phoenix World Championships	2023

The 2022 Rising Phoenix World Championships was a professional bodybuilding competition for women that was held in conjunction with Arizona Women's Pro and the NPC Wings of Strength Arizona Women's Extravaganza. It was held on 5 November 2022 at the Gila River Resorts & Casinos – Wild Horse Pass in Chandler, Arizona, United States of America. It was the 8th Rising Phoenix World Championships to be held.

== Results ==
=== Scorecard ===
No	Name	Country	Judging	Finals	Total	Place
1	Irene Anderson	Sweden	18	18	36	6
2	MayLa Ash	(United States) Irving, Texas	6	6	12	2
3	Michaela Aycock	(United States) Bartow, Florida	9	9	18	3
4	Reshanna Boswell	(United States) Deerfield Beach, Illinois	27	27	54	9
5	Nadia Capotosto	Italy	35	35	70	12
6	Lisa Cross	United Kingdom	42	42	84	14
7	Leah Dennie	(United States) North Richland Hills, Texas	12	21	24	4
8	Chelsea Dion	(United States) Las Vegas, Nevada	24	24	48	8
9	Asha Hadley	(United States) Tomball, Florida	34	34	68	11
10	Michelle Jin	(United States) Hillsborough, North Carolina	30	30	60	10
11	Janeen Lankowski	(United States) Tampa, Florida	45	45	90	15
12	Sheena Ohlig	(United States) Camden, New Jersey	39	39	78	13
13	Mona Poursaleh	Canada	15	15	30	5
14	Donna W. Salib	(United States) Louisville, Kentucky	48	48	96	16
15	Virginia Sanchez	Spain	21	21	42	7
16	Andrea Shaw	(United States) Clinton Township, Michigan	3	3	6	1
17	Tina Williams	(United States) Lawrence, Kansas	48	48	96	16

=== Most muscular award ===
- Irene Andersen

=== Best poser award ===
- 1st - Mona Poursaleh
- 2nd - MayLa Ash
- 3rd - Janeen Lankowski

=== Best intro video award ===
- 1st - Janeen Lankowski
- 2nd - Sheena Ohlig
- 3rd - MayLa Ash

== Notable events ==
- This was Andrea Shaw's 3rd Ms. Rising Phoenix title win.

== Awards ==
Most muscular award

- $5,000

Best poser award

- 1st - $5,000
- 2nd - $2,900
- 3rd - $1,500
- Total - $9,400

Best video award

- 1st - $5,000
- 2nd - $2,500
- 3rd - $1,500
- Total - $9,000

Ms. Rising Phoenix

- 1st - $50,000 & American prize vehicle
- 2nd - $25,000
- 3rd - $12,500
- 4th - $7,500
- 5th - $5,000
- Total - $77,500 & Chevrolet Silverado 2500 HD

Total overall - $100,900 & Chevrolet Silverado 2500 HD

== Official competitors list ==
- Andrea Shaw
- Mona Poursaleh
- Michaela Aycock
- Leah Dennie
- Irene Andersen
- Mayla Ash
- Reshanna Boswell
- Nadia Capotosto
- Lisa Cross
- Chelsa Dion
- Asha Hadley
- Michelle Jin
- Janeen Lankowski
- Sheena Ohlig
- Virginia Sanchez
- Tina Williams
- Aisling Hickey
