= Body Odyssey =

- Directed by: Grazia Tricarico
- Written by: Marco Morana; Giulio Rizzo; Grazia Tricarico
- Starring: Jacqueline Fuchs; Julian Sands
- Release date: 2023 (Tallinn Black Nights)
- Running time: 103 minutes
- Countries: Switzerland; Italy
- Language: English

Body Odyssey is a 2023 Swiss Italian drama film written by Marco Morana, Giulio Rizzo and Grazia Tricarico, directed by Tricarico and starring Jacqueline Fuchs and Julian Sands.

== Cast ==
- Jacqueline Fuchs as Mona
- Julian Sands as Kurt

== Release ==
The film premiered at the 2023 Tallinn Black Nights Film Festival.

== Reception ==
Mary Beth McAndrews of Dread Central awarded the film four and a half stars out of five.

Bradley Gibson of Film Threat rated the film a 9 out of 10.

Alexandra Heller-Nicholas of the Alliance of Women Film Journalists gave the film a positive review and wrote, “Body Odyssey is a kind of futuristic, sci-fi inflected feminist Toby Dammit, where Fellini’s focus on movie stardom is replaced here with bodybuilding – and yes, it’s as good as that sounds.”
