= Rising Phoenix World Championships =

Professional female bodybuilding competition

- Status: Active
- Genre: IFBB Professional League professional female bodybuilding
- Frequency: Annually
- Venue: Gila River Resorts & Casinos – Wild Horse Pass, Chandler, Arizona, United States of America
- Coordinates: 33.281176°N 111.973°W
- Years active: 11
- Inaugurated: 22 August 2015
- Founder: Jake Wood; Kristal Wood
- Most recent: 2023 Rising Phoenix World Championships
- Previous event: 2022 Rising Phoenix World Championships
- Next event: 2024 Rising Phoenix World Championships
- Participants: 15 Rising Phoenix World Championships invited IFBB Professional League professional female bodybuilders (mean; 2020 – present) 19 Rising Phoenix World Championships qualified IFBB Professional League professional female bodybuilders (mean; 2015 – 2019)
- Area: International
- Major events: Spectator sport
- Promoter: Alex Sacasa; Wings of Strength
- Organizer: Wings of Strength
- Website: wingsofstrength.net

The IFBB Pro League Wings of Strength Rising Phoenix Women's Bodybuilding World Championships is a professional female bodybuilding competition, promoted by Wings of Strength and founded by Jake and Kristal Wood., and sanctioned by the International Federation of Bodybuilding (IFBB). It is considered to be the most prestigious IFBB Professional League all women's bodybuilding event in the world. The show's inception came as a result of the elimination of the Ms. Olympia, being the pinnacle of women's bodybuilding from 2015 to 2019, while the Ms. Olympia contest was on hiatus. The first championship show took place in conjunction with the IFBB Texas Pro, the NPC Tim Gardner Texas Extravaganza, and the NPC National on August 22, 2015, at the Grand Hyatt, San Antonio, Texas.

== History ==
=== 2015 – 2019 ===
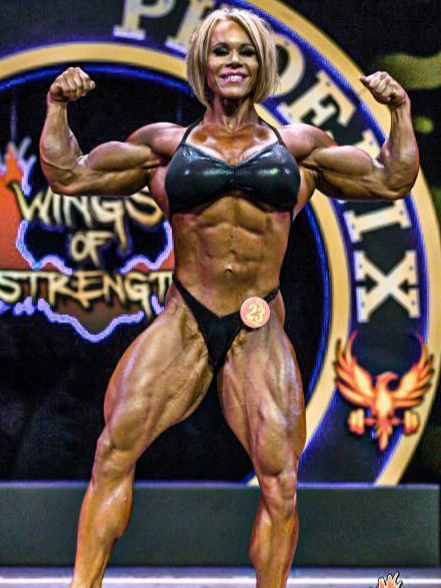
Aleesha Young twice won the Most Muscular Award.

On March 8, 2015, Wings of Strength announced the creation of the Rising Phoenix World Championships. Regarded as the successor to the Ms. Olympia, Rising Phoenix World Championships adopted the point qualification system that the Ms. Olympia had.

At the 2015 Rising Phoenix World Championships, with Iris Kyle retired and Alina Popa not attending, Margie Martin, a dark horse contestant, managed to beat much more seasoned professional bodybuilders such as Helle Trevino, Debi Laszewski and Yaxeni Oriquen-Garcia in order to win the Ms. Rising Phoenix title. At the 2016 Championships, Martin repeated her success and retained her title. At the 2017 Championships, with Martin not defending her title, Trevino won the title. At the 2018 Championships, Popa dethroned Trevino and beat Martin to win the title. At the 2019 Championships, with Popa retired, Trevino went on to beat Martin and again win the title.

=== 2020 – present ===
In 2020, several changes were made to the Rising Phoenix World Championships. The 2020 Olympia Qualification System changed the qualification from the Olympia Qualification System to an application invitational contest and it became a Tier 1 Contest on the 2020 Olympia Qualification System. This changed the Rising Phoenix World Championships from being the equivalent of the Ms. Olympia to the equivalent of the Ms. International. Due to the COVID-19 pandemic, the 2020 Rising Phoenix World Championships was moved from September 5, 2020 in Phoenix, Arizona to December 5, 2020 in Las Vegas, Nevada. At the 2020 Rising Phoenix World Championships, Andrea Shaw dethroned Helle Trevino. Andrea would go on to consecutively win the 2021, 2022 and 2023 Rising Phoenix World Championships. Starting during the 2023 Olympia Qualification System period, the tier point system was removed, with only Ms. Rising Phoenix qualifying for the 2023 Ms. Olympia.

== Champions ==
=== Chronologically ===
Year	Champions	Best poser award	Most muscular award	Best intro video award	Posedown music	Total prize	Venue
2015	(United States) Margaret Martin	(United States) Margaret Martin			Macarena by Los del Río	$99,500 & $65,000 Jeep Wrangler	Grand Hyatt, San Antonio, Texas, United States
2016	(United States) Margaret Martin	(United States) Sheila Bleck			Tootsie Roll by Old School Players	$150,000 & $65,000 Jeep	Talking Stick Resort, Scottsdale, Arizona, United States
2017	(United States) Helle Trevino	(United States) Sheila Bleck	(United States) Aleesha Young	(Italy) Silvia Matta		$128,000 & $65,000 Jeep Wrangler	Talking Stick Resort, Scottsdale, Arizona, United States
2018	(Romania) Alina Popa	(Canada) Nicole Chartrand	(United States) Helle Trevino	(United States) LaDawn McDay		$123,000 & $100,000 Chevrolet Corvette	Wild Horse Pass Hotel & Casino, Chandler, Arizona, United States
2019	(United States) Helle Trevino	(Canada) Mona Poursaleh	(United States) Aleesha Young	(Italy) Silvia Matta	Berzerk by Eminem	$115,900 & $100,000 Dodge Challenger Hellcat	Wild Horse Pass Hotel & Casino, Chandler, Arizona, United States
2020	(United States) Andrea Shaw	(United States) Andrea Shaw				$115,900 & Chevrolet Camaro	Talking Stick Resort, Scottsdale, Arizona, United States
2021	(United States) Andrea Shaw	(Canada) Mona Poursaleh	(Sweden) Irene Andersen	(United States) LaDawn McDay	Bring Me to Life by Evanescence	& American prize vehicle	Talking Stick Resort, Scottsdale, Arizona, United States
2022	(United States) Andrea Shaw	(Canada) Mona Poursaleh	(Sweden) Irene Andersen	(United States) Janeen Lankowski	Moonlight Sonata (Epic Trailer Version) by Hidden Citizens Diplomatico (Remix) by Jabato; Get It On The Floor (feat. Swizz Beatz) by DMX; Lacrimosa by Apashe	$120,500 & Chevrolet Silverado 2500 HD	Gila River Resorts & Casinos – Wild Horse Pass, Chandler, Arizona, United States
2023	(United States) Andrea Shaw	(United States) Rene Marven	(United States) Andrea Shaw		Bulls On Parade by Rage Against the Machine	$125,000	Phoenix, Arizona, United States of America
2024	(United States) Angela Yeo	(United States) Angela Yeo	(United States) Andrea Shaw			$144,000	Gila River Resorts & Casinos – Wild Horse Pass, Chandler, Arizona, United States

=== Number of wins ===
Rank	Champions	Years	Number of wins			
Rank	Champions	Years	Overall	Best poser award	Most muscular award	Best intro video award
1st	(United States) Andrea Shaw	2020 – 2023	4	1	1	0
2nd	(United States) Margaret Martin	2015 – 2016	2	1	0	0
2nd	(United States) Helle Trevino	2017 & 2019	2	0	1	0
3rd	(Romania) Alina Popa	2018	1	0	0	0
4th	(United States) Sheila Bleck	2016 – 2017	0	2	0	0
4th	(Canada) Mona Poursaleh	2021 – 2022	0	2	0	0
4th	(United States) Aleesha Young	2017 & 2019	0	0	2	0
4th	(Sweden) Irene Andersen	2021 – 2022	0	0	2	0
4th	(Italy) Silvia Matta	2017 & 2019	0	0	0	2
4th	(United States) LaDawn McDay	2018 & 2021	0	0	0	2
5th	(Canada) Nicole Chartrand	2018	0	1	0	0
5th	(United States) Janeen Lankowski	2022	0	0	0	1
5th	(United States) Rene Marven	2023	0	1	0	0

=== Number of consecutive wins ===
Ranking	Champions	Years	Number of consecutive wins			
Ranking	Champions	Years	Overall	Best poser award	Most muscular award	Best intro video award
1st	(United States) Andrea Shaw	2020 – 2023	4	0	0	0
2nd	(United States) Margaret Martin	2015 – 2016	2	0	0	0
3rd	(United States) Sheila Bleck	2016 – 2017	0	2	0	0
3rd	(Canada) Mona Poursaleh	2021 – 2022	0	2	0	0
3rd	(Sweden) Irene Andersen	2021 – 2022	0	0	2	0

=== Top 3 (Ms. Rising Phoenix) ===
Year	Champions	Runner−Up	3rd Place
2015	(United States) Margaret Martin	(United States) Helle Trevino	(United States) Debi Laszewski
2016	(United States) Margaret Martin	(United States) Sheila Bleck	(Romania) Alina Popa
2017	(United States) Helle Trevino	(United States) Sheila Bleck	(United States) Yaxeni Oriquen-Garcia
2018	(Romania) Alina Popa	(United States) Margaret Martin	(United States) Sheila Bleck
2019	(United States) Helle Trevino	(United States) Margaret Martin	(Sweden) Irene Andersen
2020	(United States) Andrea Shaw	(United States) Helle Trevino	(United States) Monique Jones
2021	(United States) Andrea Shaw	(United States) Helle Trevino	(Canada) Mona Poursaleh
2022	(United States) Andrea Shaw	(United States) MayLa Ash	(United States) Michaela Aycock
2023	(United States) Andrea Shaw	(United States) Angela Yeo	(United States) Michaela Aycock

==== Medals by nation (Ms. Rising Phoenix) ====
Rank	Nation	Gold	Silver	Bronze	Total
1	United States (USA)	8	9	6	23
2	Romania (ROU)	1	0	1	2
3	Canada (CAN)	0	0	1	1
3	Sweden (SWE)	0	0	1	1
Totals (4 entries)		9	9	9	27

=== Top 3 (Best poser award) ===
Year	Champions	Runner−Up	3rd Place
2017	(United States) Sheila Bleck	(Spain) Virginia Sanchez	(United States) Pauline Nelson
2018	(Canada) Nicole Chartrand	(United States) Sheila Bleck	(United States) Pauline Nelson
2019	(Canada) Mona Poursaleh	(United States) Janeen Lankowski	(Canada) Nicole Chartrand
2021	(Canada) Mona Poursaleh	(United States) Janeen Lankowski	(United States) MayLa Ash
2022	(Canada) Mona Poursaleh	(United States) MayLa Ash	(United States) Janeen Lankowski
2023	(United States) Rene Marven	(Canada) Nicole Chartrand	(United States) Kristina Mendoza

==== Medals by nation (Best poser award) ====
Rank	Nation	Gold	Silver	Bronze	Total
1	Canada (CAN)	4	1	1	6
2	United States (USA)	3	4	5	12
3	Spain (ESP)	0	1	0	1
Totals (3 entries)		7	6	6	19

=== Medals by nation (Most muscular award) ===
Rank	Nation	Most muscular award
1	United States (USA)	3
2	Sweden (SWE)	2

=== Top 3 (Best intro video award) ===
Year	Champions	Runner−Up	3rd Place
2017	(Italy) Silvia Matta	(Canada) Nicole Chartrand	(United States) Teresa Ivancik
2018	(United States) LaDawn McDay	(Spain) Virginia Sanchez	(Romania) Alina Popa
2019	(Italy) Silvia Matta	(United States) Aleesha Young	(Canada) Nicole Chartrand
2021	(United States) LaDawn McDay	(United States) Janeen Lankowski	(United States) Nicole Chartrand
2022	(United States) Janeen Lankowski	(United States) Sheena Ohlig	(United States) MayLa Ash

==== Medals by nation (Best intro video award) ====
Rank	Nation	Gold	Silver	Bronze	Total
1	United States (USA)	3	3	3	9
2	Italy (ITA)	2	0	0	2
3	Spain (ESP)	0	1	0	1
4	Canada (CAN)	0	0	1	1
4	Romania (ROU)	0	0	1	1
Totals (5 entries)		5	4	5	14

=== Other records ===
- Closest Ms. Rising Phoenix scores - 2017 Rising Phoenix World Championships with a margin of 0
- Heaviest Ms. Rising Phoenix - Andrea Shaw (175 lb (79 kg))
- Lightest Ms. Rising Phoenix - Helle Trevino (157 lb (71 kg))
- Ms. Rising Phoenix with highest number of perfect win scores - Andrea Shaw with 4
- Ms. Rising Phoenix with largest biceps - Andrea Shaw (18 in (46 cm))
- Oldest Ms. Rising Phoenix - Helle Trevino (44 years old; 2019 Rising Phoenix World Championships)
  - Oldest Ms. Rising Phoenix best poser award - Sheila Bleck (42 years old; 2017 Rising Phoenix World Championships)
  - Oldest Ms. Rising Phoenix most muscular award - Irene Andersen (56 years old; 2022 Rising Phoenix World Championships)
  - Oldest Ms. Rising Phoenix best video intro award - Janeen Lankowski (48 years, 3 months and 29 days old; 2022 Rising Phoenix World Championships)
- Smallest Ms. Rising Phoenix - Margaret Martin / Helle Trevino (5 ft 5 in (1.65 m))
- Tallest Ms. Rising Phoenix - Alina Popa (5 ft 6 in (1.68 m))
- Youngest Ms. Rising Phoenix - Margaret Martin (36 years old; 2015 Rising Phoenix World Championships)
  - Youngest Ms. Rising Phoenix best poser award - Nicole Chartrand (33 years old; 2018 Rising Phoenix World Championships)
  - Youngest Ms. Rising Phoenix most muscular award - Aleesha Young (32 years old; 2017 Rising Phoenix World Championships)
  - Youngest Ms. Rising Phoenix best poser award - Silvia Matta (43 years old; 2017 Rising Phoenix World Championships)

== See also ==
- Ms. Olympia
- Ms. International
