= Lisa Cross =

Professional British female bodybuilder

- Professional bodybuilder

Personal info
- Born: 4 April 1978 (age 48); Rochdale, England

Best statistics
- Height: 5 ft 8 in (1.73 m)
- Weight: In Season: 150 lb (68 kg); Off-Season: 160 lb (73 kg)

Professional (Pro) career
- Pro-debut: IFBB Tampa Pro; 2014
- Best win: IFBB Omaha Pro; 2015
- Predecessor: Anne Freitas
- Successor: Isabelle Turrell
- Active: Since 2006

Lisa Cross (born 4 April 1978) is a professional British female bodybuilder and pornographic actress.

== Early life and education ==
Lisa was born in Rochdale in 1978. She had eating problems that began while studying for her GCSEs. Around the age of 15 she became anorexic. She gained all As and A*s in her GCSEs and then achieved four A-Levels which allowed her to take a degree in Russian and Politics at Birmingham University.

== Bodybuilding career ==
=== Amateur ===
Lisa has been weight training since 2003 and has been conditioning for competitive entry since 2008. She first really got into bodybuilding in 2006 while she was living in Japan while she was teaching English. Her boyfriend at the time was a Japanese bodybuilding champion and she started reading up on bodybuilding, such as Negrita Jayde, and started training with weights. In 2007, after she got married, she went to see the 2007 Ms. Olympia competition for their honeymoon and was impressed when she saw female bodybuilders for the first time. Former UK junior champion Lewis Breed oversees her training and pre-contest preparation for bodybuilding. She competed in her debut competition at the 2009 NABBA England, placing second place behind Jennie Ellam. She then competed at the 2009 NABBA Universe achieving second place to Larissa Cunha. Her best win was first place at the UKBFF British Championships, where she won the Ladies Physique class. On 19 March 2014, she announced that she had been awarded her IFBB pro card and can now compete as a pro.

=== Professional ===
Lisa attended her first IFBB professional competition at the 2014 Tampa Pro, where she placed 16th place. In 2015, Alina Popa became her coach and started training at the Armbrust PRO Gym. Her training paid off when she went on to win the 2015 Omaha Pro, the first time a professional British female bodybuilder won an overall professional competition since 1999.

=== Contest history ===
- 2009 NABBA England - 2nd
- 2009 NABBA Universe - 2nd
- 2009 UKBFF Hercules - 1st
- 2010 UKBFF British Championships - 1st
- 2011 Arnold Amateur Europe - 4th
- 2011 Women's World Amateur Championships - 4th (HW)
- 2013 Arnold Amateur Europe - 2nd
- 2014 IFBB Tampa Pro - 16th
- 2015 IFBB Omaha Pro - 1st
- 2015 IFBB Wings of Strength Rising Phoenix World Championships - 9th
- 2016 IFBB Tampa Pro - 2nd
- 2016 IFBB Wings of Strength Rising Phoenix World Championships – 7th
- 2017 IFBB Tampa Pro - 2nd
- 2017 IFBB WOS Rising Phoenix World Championships – 9th
- 2018 IFBB Tampa Pro - 4th
- 2019 IFBB Romania Muscle Fest Pro - 6th
- 2022 IFBB WOS Rising Phoenix World Championships – 14th

== Personal life ==
Cross is a former police officer and English teacher. She speaks English, French, Russian and Japanese. This is due to her time living in France, Russia and Japan. In 2014, she published her first book, Devil and Disciple – The Temptation. Her sponsors are CNP Professional, Melanotan Europe, and Powerzone Gym Equipment. She runs her own community gym. She is also a hardcore pornographic performer.

== See also ==
- Female bodybuilding
- List of female professional bodybuilders
