= Christine Envall =

Australian professional bodybuilder

- Professional bodybuilder

Personal info
- Nickname: Australia's most muscular woman
- Born: 28 November 1972 (age 53); Bendigo, Australia

Best statistics
- Height: 5 ft 3 in (1.60 m)
- Weight: In Season: 160–165 lb (73–75 kg); Off-Season: 190 lb (86 kg)

Professional (Pro) career
- Pro-debut: IFBB Jan Tana Classic; 2001
- Best win: IFBB Toronto Pro Supershow champion; 2015
- Predecessor: Simone Oliveira
- Successor: Laura Carolan
- Active: Since 1991

Christine Envall (born 28 November 1972) is an Australian professional bodybuilder and nutritionist.

== Early life and education ==
Christine Envall was born in 1972 in Queensland, Australia. Her hometown is Bendigo, Victoria. She attended Castlemaine High School. In 1991, she started attending RMIT University, where she studied for food science and nutrition. She graduated RMIT University in 1994.

== Bodybuilding career ==
=== Amateur career ===
Envall is one of the few female bodybuilders with a career that spans more than two decades. In 1991 she first took part in the NPC-A/IFBB Bendigo City where she placed 3rd. Between 1991 and 1995, Christine Envall participated in six NABBA Australasian Championships. In 1995, during the NPCA/IFBB Australian Nationals, she was awarded her IFBB pro status without being judged.

Also in 1995, during the NPC-A/IFBB Australasian Championships Envall was ranked 3rd, simply because her very lean profile did not set a good example for the other women. Reason being that her physique didn't warrant her to compete in the same category as amateur bodybuilders. Between 1996 and 2001, Christine focused most of her energy in trying out for various NABBA World Championships.

=== Professional career ===
In 2001, Envall competed in her first IFBB pro show, the Jan Tana Classic, where she placed 6th in the heavyweight class. In 2015, at the Toronto Pro Supershow she won her first ever IFBB pro competition. It is documented that Christine Envall is the only active IFBB female bodybuilder from Australia.

=== Competition history ===
- 1991 NPC-A/IFBB Bendigo City – 3rd
- 1991 NPC-A/IFBB Outback Classic – 1st (LW)
- 1991 NABBA Victorian Championships – 1st (Short Class)
- 1992 NABBA Australasian Championships – 5th
- 1994 NPC-A/IFBB Bendigo City – 1st (Open)
- 1994 NPC-A/IFBB Southern States – 1st (MW)
- 1995 NPC-A/IFBB Australasian Championships – 3rd (HW)
- 1995 NPC-A/IFBB Southern States – 2nd (HW)
- 1995 NPC-A/IFBB Victorian Championships – 1st (HW and overall)
- 1995 NPC-A/IFBB Australia's Most Muscular Woman – 1st
- 1997 NABBA Victorian Championships – 1st
- 1997 NABBA Night of Australia's Best – 1st
- 1997 NABBA Australian Championships – 2nd
- 1997 NABBA World Championships – 1st (Overall)
- 1997 NABBA Australasian Championships – 1st (Overall)
- 1997 NABBA Universe – 2nd (Short Class)
- 1998 NABBA Australian Championships – 1st (Overall)
- 1998 NABBA World Championships – 1st (Overall)
- 1999 NABBA Australian Championships – 1st (Overall)
- 1999 NABBA World Championships – 3rd
- 2000 NABBA World Championships – 1st (Overall)
- 2001 NPC-A/IFBB Southern States – 1st (HW)
- 2001 IFBB Jan Tana Classic – 6th (HW)
- 2001 IFBB Pro Extravaganza – 6th (HW)
- 2002 IFBB South West Pro – 3rd (HW)
- 2002 IFBB Jan Tana Classic – 8th (HW)
- 2003 IFBB Night of Champions – 7th (HW)
- 2003 IFBB Jan Tana Classic – 5th (MW)
- 2005 NABBA Southern Hemisphere – 1st
- 2013 IFBB Chicago Pro Championships – 7th
- 2013 IFBB Tampa Pro Championships – 14th
- 2013 IFBB Toronto Pro – 11th
- 2014 IFBB Chicago Pro Championships – 3rd
- 2014 IFBB Ms. Olympia – 11th
- 2014 IFBB Omaha Pro – 3rd
- 2014 IFBB Toronto Pro – 6th
- 2015 IFBB Omaha Pro – 3rd
- 2015 IFBB Toronto Pro – 1st
- 2015 IFBB Wings of Strength Rising Phoenix World Championships – 10th

== Personal life ==
Envall currently lives Gold Coast, Queensland. She has been very active in the supplements and nutrition. She is one of the owners of one of the largest nutrition powerhouses, International Protein, in Australia. She was born in a family of two and has five half brothers and sisters, including sister Zoe Hauser and brother Michael Envall.
