= Alana Shipp =

Barbadan professional female bodybuilder

- אלנה שיפ
- Professional bodybuilder

Personal info
- Born: 1982 (age 43–44); Bridgetown, Barbados

Best statistics
- Height: 5 ft 2 in (1.57 m)
- Weight: 125 lb (57 kg)

Professional (Pro) career
- Pro-debut: IFBB Toronto Pro; 2014
- Best win: NPC National Championship middleweight champion; 2013
- Predecessor: Rene Marven
- Successor: Tomefafa Ameka
- Active: Since 2011

Alana Shipp (Hebrew: אלנה שיפ; born 1982) is a Barbadan professional female bodybuilder, based in Jerusalem.

== Early life ==
Alana Shipp was born in 1982 in Bridgetown, Barbados to Guyanese parents. She spent her early childhood in Guyana prior to moving to Queens, New York City, New York at age 11.

Born to mother Roxanne Brathwaite

Siblings

Amanda Methland

Ackeem Methland

Alex Methland

== Career ==
=== Marine Corps ===
After graduating high school, Shipp enlisted in the US Marine Corps and spent almost 8 years as a Marine. She was a non-commissioned officer, working as a logistics procurement manager in Okinawa, Japan; Camp Pendleton, California; and in New Orleans, Louisiana. In late 2008, she moved to Israel.

=== Fitness ===
==== Amateur ====
In 2011, Shipp began working out in order lose some weight she gained during her two pregnancies (160 lb (73 kg)) and hoping to get into better shape for an upcoming Marine Corps ball. In October 2011, she began working out with Lia Finkelberg Elbaz and Meny Elbaz at their Jerusalem boutique gym, Sky Gym and suggested training her for a bodybuilding competition in the fitness category.

==== Contest history ====
- 2012 NAC Ms. Israel - 1st (Ms Fitness)

=== Bodybuilding ===
==== Amateur ====
Shipp said she was originally planning on competing at the 2012 Ms. Universe on the figure category but gained muscle mass faster than expected. Her training coach is Arthur Gooden. At the 2013 NPC National Championship, Shipp won the middleweight division and won her IFBB pro card.

==== Professional ====
In 2014, during Shipp first year competing as a professional she qualified for the 2014 Ms. Olympia. At the 2014 Ms. Olympia, she mirrored Sheila Bleck's success at the 2010 Ms. Olympia by winning 4th place at her first Ms. Olympia she attended and during first year she competed as a professional.

==== Contest history ====
- 2012 NAC Ms. Universe - 3rd (Ms Body/Physique)
- 2013 NPC Steve Stone Metropolitan - 1st (LW and overall)
- 2013 NPC National Championship - 1st (MW)
- 2014 IFBB Toronto Pro - 2nd place
- 2014 IFBB Omaha Pro - 5th
- 2014 IFBB Ms. Olympia - 4th
- 2015 IFBB Wings of Strength PBW Tampa Pro - 2nd
- 2015 IFBB Wings of Strength Rising Phoenix World Championships - 5th
- 2016 IFBB Wings of Strength Rising Phoenix World Championships – 16th

== Personal life ==
Shipp currently lives in Virginia with her husband Kenneth Shipp, a U.S. Consulate employee, and her two children. Prior to taking up bodybuilding, she was a housewife. Before arriving in Jerusalem she worked as a procurement manager for Coca-Cola in Dallas, Texas. She is a Christian.
