= Andrea Shaw =

American professional bodybuilder (born 1983)

- ♀ professional bodybuilder & professional women's physique
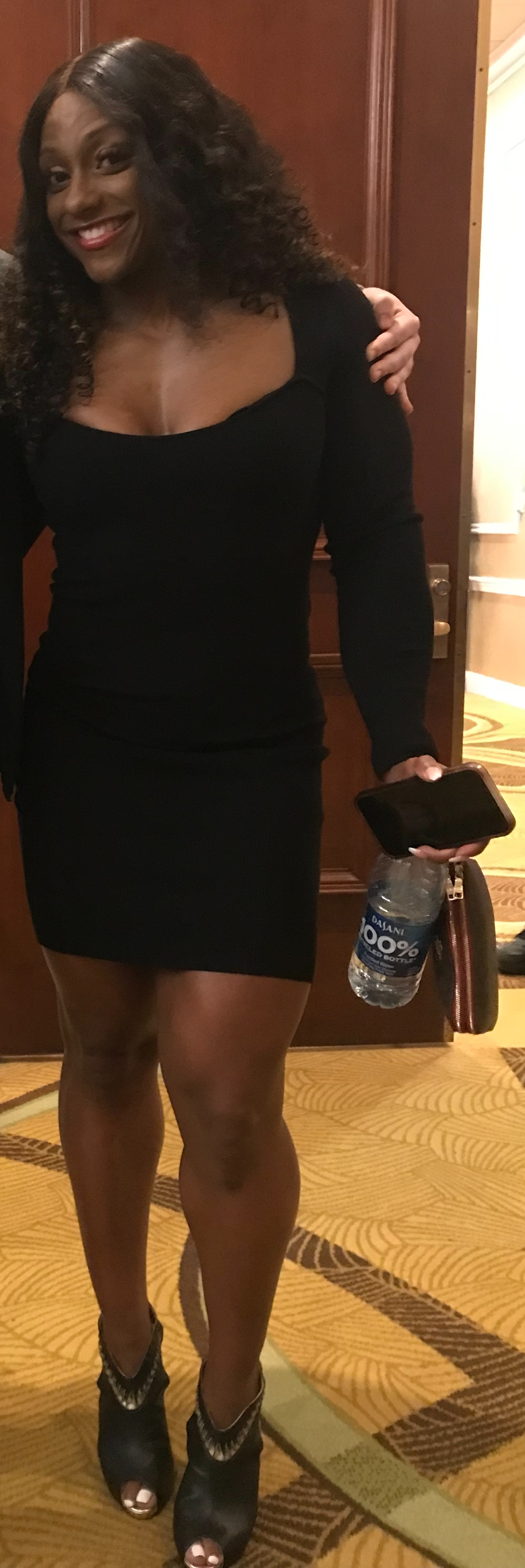
- Andrea Shaw at the 2023 International Federation of Bodybuilding & Fitness Professional League (IFBB) New York Pro.

Personal info
- Born: Andrea Shaw; December 18, 1983 (age 42)

Best statistics
- Bench press: 250 lb (110 kg)
- Biceps: 18 in (46 cm)
- Contest weight: 170–180 lb (77–82 kg)
- Height: 5 ft 5 1/2 in (1.66 m)
- Off-season weight: 180–209 lb (82–95 kg)
- Thighs: 27 in (69 cm)

Professional (Pro) career
- Pro-debut: IFBB Toronto Pro Supershow (physique), 2019 IFBB Wings of Strength Chicago Pro Championships (bodybuilding), 2019
- Best wins: IFBB Ms. Olympia; 2020–2024
- Predecessor: Iris Kyle
- Pro years: 2019 (physique); 2019–present (bodybuilding)
- Coaches: John Simmons (2016–present)
Medal record
Ms. Olympia
1st	2020 Ms. Olympia
1st	2021 Ms. Olympia
1st	2022 Ms. Olympia
1st	2023 Ms. Olympia
1st	2024 Ms. Olympia
1st	2025 Ms. Olympia
1st	2026 Ms. Olympia
IFBB Rising Phoenix World Championships
1st	2020 Rising Phoenix World Championships
1st	2021 Rising Phoenix World Championships
1st	2022 Rising Phoenix World Championships
1st	2023 Rising Phoenix World Championships
2nd	2024 Rising Phoenix World Championships
1st	2025 Rising Phoenix World Championships
1st	2026 Rising Phoenix World Championships
Other IFBB contests
2nd	2019 Chicago Pro
1st	2020 Omaha Pro

Andrea Shaw (born December 18, 1983) is an American professional bodybuilder. She holds seven Ms. Olympia title wins and four Ms. Rising Phoenix title wins.

== Early life ==
Shaw grew up in Michigan. As a girl growing up, she was into gymnastics and competitive cheerleading. In her eighth-grade aerobics class at Benjamin Nolan Middle School, which didn't offer adequate equipment or much organized sports, her teacher taught her to make her own structures. At the age of 13, Shaw saw Lenda Murray for the first time because both her mother and Murray worked out at Powerhouse Gym in Center Line, Michigan. At the time, she never thought she would be good enough to compete in female bodybuilding. After middle school, she was burnt out from gymnastics and cheerleading, so she focused on academics in high school. After gaining some extra weight, her mother, a nurse and former personal trainer, encouraged her to start working out at Powerhouse Gym as well. Shaw began attending the gym on her own, and her mother's training partner, a female bodybuilder, began advising her on muscle building. She said she had no desire at 17 to be a bodybuilder, instead wanting to be a fashion model, but she was not tall enough.

== Figure career ==
At the age of 18, Shaw's training adviser told her mom she didn't think she had the heart to stick with training. This encouraged her to focus on obtaining great shape. While training one day at Powerhouse Gym, she came across an Oxygen Magazine and saw the magazine was full of athletic fitness and sports models. She decided that would be her ambition. However, her body began responding quickly to resistance training and once she started intense weight training, soon people were asking her if she competed in muscle competitions. She didn't see herself as having enough size and development to compete as a bodybuilder, but liked the way the figure competitors looked in the magazines. In 2008, she entered two figure competitions, placing 3rd and 4th, but she didn't feel she was on the right path. She took 8 years off from competing.

During this time, Shaw attended Wayne State University, where she studied exercise science. She earned a BA in exercise and sports science, along with continuing to refine her resistance training. Shaw said she neglected her physical health and gained about 20 pounds her freshman year. To address her physical health, she took small steps to exercise and diet. She also started lifting heavier and found she put on size easily. Instead of cutting food from her diet, Shaw said she made substitutions, like baked chips in place of regular chips, and spinach wraps rather than regular bread. She began to research bodybuilding and took an eight-year break after college to continue her bodybuilding studies. She interned at the Detroit Medical Center, worked in the physical therapy department at Beaumont, and received her group training and personal training certificates..

=== Competition history ===
- 2008 Karen Zaremba Classic – 3rd
- 2008 Michigan Natural Championships – 4th

== Physique career ==
Over the next eight years, Shaw took a break from competing, instead focusing on studying and reading (Oxygen Magazine, Muscle & Fitness, Shape, and Muscular Development), researching exercise, and obtaining a new trainer. She returned to school and found a program that specifically addressed experience and sports science. In 2016, Shaw decided to resume competing and switched to physique. After competing in six competitions, she placed 2nd at the 2018 Nationals, qualifying for an IFBB pro card. She went on to attend the 2019 Toronto Pro, placing 11th.

=== Competition history ===
- 2016 John Simmons Championships – 4th
- 2018 Ohio Natural Championship – 2nd
- 2018 John Simmons Championship – 1st
- 2018 Lenda Murray Detroit Classic – 1st
- 2018 North Americans – 3rd
- 2018 Nationals – 2nd
- 2019 IFBB Toronto Pro Supershow – 11th

== Bodybuilding ==
=== Competition history ===
- 2019 IFBB Pro League (IFBB) Wings of Strength (WOS) Chicago Pro Women's Bodybuilding - 2nd
- 2019 IFBB WOS Rising Phoenix Women's Bodybuilding World Championship - 7th
- 2020 IFBB Omaha Pro Women's Bodybuilding - 1st
- 2020 Tim Gardner Productions (TGP) IFBB WOS Rising Phoenix Women's Bodybuilding World Championships - 1st
- 2020 Ms. Olympia - 1st
- 2021 TGP IFBB WOS Rising Phoenix Women's Bodybuilding World Championships - 1st
- 2021 Ms. Olympia - 1st
- 2022 IFBB Bikini Lab Hawaii Rising Phoenix Women's Bodybuilding World Championship - 1st
- 2022 Ms. Olympia - 1st
- 2023 IFBB Rising Phoenix & Arizona Pro - 1st
- 2023 Ms. Olympia - 1st
- 2024 IFBB Rising Phoenix & Arizona Pro - 2nd
- 2024 Ms. Olympia - 1st
- 2025 IFBB Rising Phoenix & Arizona Pro - 1st
- 2025 Ms. Olympia - 1st
- 2026 IFBB Rising Phoenix & Arizona Pro - 1st
- 2026 Ms. Olympia - 1st

=== Best statistics ===
- Bench press - 250 lb (110 kg)
- Biceps - 18 in (46 cm)
- Height - 5 ft 5 1/2 in (1.66 m)
- On season weight - 170–180 lb (77–82 kg)
- Thighs - 27 in (69 cm)

== Personal life ==
Shaw currently lives in Michigan, working as a personal trainer and has plans to go back to school, hoping to one day obtain a doctorate.

== See also ==
- Lenda Murray
