= Jacqueline Fuchs =

Professional Swiss body builder

Jacqueline "Jay" Fuchs (born 31 July 1971) is a Swiss professional female bodybuilder. Her achievements in various competitions has led pundits to regard her as one of the "ten best female bodybuilders in the world".

In July 2016, Fuchs won that year's edition of the IFBB Chicago Pro. The victory qualified her to vie for the crown of professional female bodybuilding at the Rising Phoenix World Championships that September. Fuchs placed 12th overall.

== Contest history ==
Comeback 2022

2018

- IFBB Chicago Pro Championships - 3rd
- IFBB Lenda Murray Pro - 1st
- IFBB WOS Rising Phoenix World Championships - 11th

2017

- IFBB Tampa Pro - 5th

2016

- 2016 IFBB Wings of Strength Rising Phoenix World Championships – 12th
- Wings of Strength Chicago Pro

- Bodybuilding: IFBB Pro Women (1st)

- Wings of Strength Chicago Pro

- Bodybuilding: MGL Best Poser Award

2015

- IFBB Tampa Pro

- Bodybuilding: Wings of Strength Best Poser

- IFBB Tampa Pro

- Bodybuilding: IFBB Pro Women (5th)

2012

- Arnold Amateur Europe

- Bodybuilding: Women Bodybuilding (1st)

== Film career ==
In the film Mad Heidi, Jacqueline plays the character Rosi, a Swiss bodybuilder female prison inmate. She shares a cell with a fellow Swiss bodybuilder Flora, played by Julia Föry. They are both introduced in their cell arm wrestling each other and both were equally matched. The arm wrestling is interrupted with Heidi and Klara both joining their cell and Klara becomes a victim of Rosi's sadist abuse. Both are experts in schwingen. She is killed accidentally by Flora while trying to kill Heidi.

In the film Body Odyssey, Fuchs plays an aging body builder by the name of Mona.
