= Sheila Bleck =

American professional female bodybuilder

- Professional bodybuilder

Personal info
- Nickname: Flex with Bleck
- Born: October 14, 1974 (age 52); Coos Bay, Oregon, U.S.

Best statistics
- Height: 5 ft 7 in (1.70 m)
- Weight: In Season: 154 lb (70 kg); Off-Season: 164 lb (74 kg)

Professional (Pro) career
- Pro-debut: IFBB New York Pro; 2010
- Best win: IFBB Wings of Strength PBW Tampa Pro champion; 2014, 2016, and 2017
- Predecessor: Tammy Jones; Margaret Martin
- Successor: Margaret Martin; Alina Popa
- Active: Retired 2019

Sheila R. Bleck (born October 14, 1974) is an American retired professional female bodybuilder.

== Early life and education ==
Bleck was born in Coos Bay, Oregon, along with her identical twin sister, Sherry. Their mother, Rebecca, was young and unmarried, and they never knew their father. Bleck has spoken of the abuse she and her sister suffered at the hands of babysitters between the ages of three and five years old. Eventually, Bleck's working mother asked the twins' grandmother to step in and take care of them.

In 1992, Sheila, who describes herself as having always been athletic, graduated from North Bend High School.

== Bodybuilding career ==
=== Amateur ===
At the age of twelve, Bleck's mother bought her and her sister their first weight bench. She cites actor Sylvester Stallone's character Rocky Balboa and the Incredible Hulk as her early inspirations. Bleck, by that time a modern dancer, would not begin lifting seriously until the age of 16, when she joined a powerlifting. Her first trainer was Jake Grabow of Better Builds Gym, from whom she received an education on eating and posing. Not long after high school graduation, Bleck started competing as a bodybuilder.

In 2008, in winning the NPC Nationals, she obtained her IFBB pro card.

=== Professional ===
In 2009, John Romano became Bleck's prep coach for her pro career, although her current prep coach is Dave Palumbo. In 2010, she came in a close second at her first professional competition, the 2010 New York Pro. She lost to Cathy LeFrançois by just one point. Since 2010, she has been in the top six of every professional bodybuilding competition in which she has competed, with the exception of the 2014 Ms. Olympia. At the 2016 Rising Phoenix World Championships, Bleck came in 2nd place overall and won the Best Poser Award.

=== Contest history ===
- 1993 Bill Pearl Classic - 2nd (HW)
- 1995 Oregon Coast Champ - 1st (HW)
- 1998 Oregon State Champ - 1st (HW)
- 1999 Oregon State Champ - 1st (HW)
- 2000 Oregon State Champ - 1st
- 2000 Emerald Cup 2000 - 1st
- 2000 USAs Nationals - 16th
- 2002 Contra Costa - 1st
- 2003 Nationals - 6th (HW)
- 2005 National - 11th
- 2006 USAs Nationals - 3rd
- 2006 Nationals - 3rd
- 2007 USAs Nationals - 2nd
- 2008 Nationals - 1st
- 2010 IFBB New York Pro - 2nd
- 2010 IFBB Ms. Olympia - 4th
- 2011 IFBB Ms. Olympia - 6th
- 2012 IFBB Tampa Pro - 2nd and Best Poser Award
- 2012 IFBB Ms. Olympia - 6th
- 2014 IFBB Tampa Pro - 1st and Best Poser Award
- 2014 IFBB Ms. Olympia - 7th
- 2016 IFBB Tampa Pro - 1st
- 2016 IFBB Rising Phoenix World Championships – 2nd and Best Poser Award
- 2017 IFBB Tampa Pro - 1st
- 2017 IFBB WOS Rising Phoenix World Championships – 2nd and Best Poser Award
- 2018 IFBB WOS Rising Phoenix World Championships – 3rd

== Personal life ==
Bleck currently resides in Vancouver, Washington.

Her sister Sherry started boxing competitively at age 19 and did so for six years with the USA Amateur Boxing Association. She fought as a welterweight and had an undefeated 10–0 career. Sherry has also competed in amateur bodybuilding three times (2004, 2005 and 2007) and took two overall titles and one second place. They remain close to this day.

== See also ==
- Female bodybuilding
- List of female professional bodybuilders
