= Michelle Jin =

Chinese American bodybuilder

- ♀ Professional bodybuilder
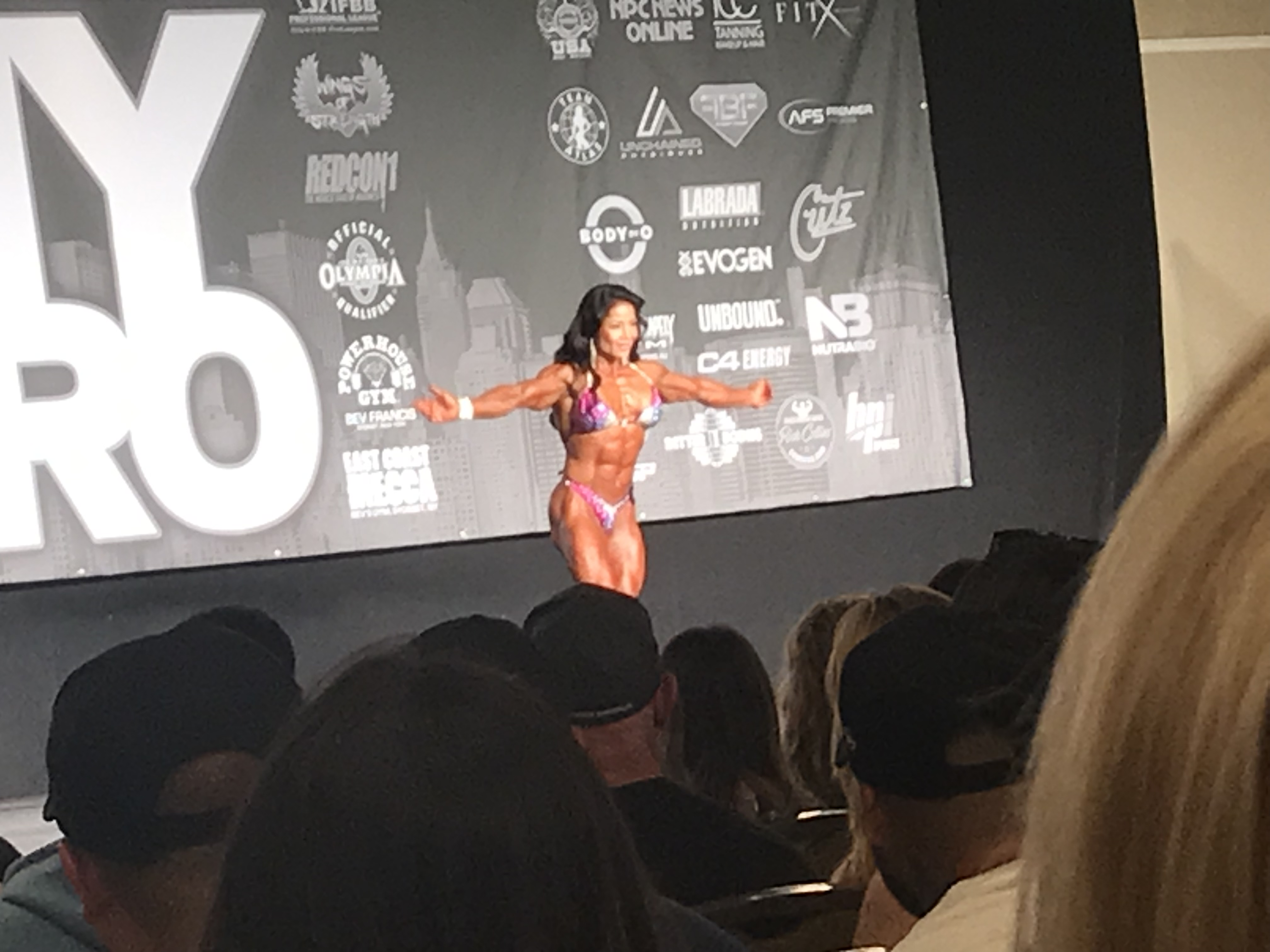
- Michelle Jin posing at the 2022 IFBB New York Pro Women's Bodybuilding finals individual posing round on 21 May 2022.

Personal info
- Born: 1974 (age 50–51); Wenzhou, Zhejiang, People's Republic of China

Best statistics
- Height: 5 ft 2 in (1.57 m)
- Weight: 159 lb (72 kg)
- Pro-debut: 2016 IFBB Omaha Pro

Michelle Jin (Chinese: 米歇尔·金) (born 1974) is a Chinese American bodybuilder.

== Early life ==
Michelle Jin was born in 1974 in a small village in Wenzhou, Zhejiang. She was raised in a conservative family, where bodybuilding was probably not considered a true career path. In 1987, she moved to the United States. In 1996, she was introduced by a friend to a gym where she began working out and developing her body.

== Figure career ==
- 2010 NPC San Francisco Championships - 3rd (Figure B)

== Physique career ==
- 2011 NPC Junior Nationals - 16th
- 2014 NPC Junior USA - 1st
- 2016 IFBB Omaha Pro - 11th
- 2017 IFBB Arnold Classic - 16th
- 2018 IFBB Champions of Power and Grace - 16th / 12th (Masters 35+)

== Bodybuilding career ==
- 2006 NPC Contra Costa (CA) Championships - 2nd (LW)
- 2019 IFBB Omaha Pro - 2nd
- 2021 IFBB Toronto Pro Supershow - 3rd
- 2022 IFBB New York Pro - 3rd
- 2022 IFFB Toronto Pro - 2nd

== Personal life ==
Jin currently lives in Hillsborough, North Carolina.
