= Monique Jones =

American bodybuilder

- Professional bodybuilder

Personal info
- Nickname: Mo, Superwoman, The Golden Girl, The Dark Destroyer
- Born: March 12, 1979 (age 47); Fort Knox, Kentucky, U.S.

Best statistics
- Height: 5 ft 8 in (1.73 m)

Professional (Pro) career
- Pro-debut: IFBB Pro Bodybuilding Weekly Championships; 2011
- Best win: IFBB WOS Chicago Pro-Am Extravaganza; 2012 and 2013
- Predecessor: None
- Successor: Maria Rita Bello
- Active: Retired 2009 (figure); Since 2008

Monique Jones (born March 12, 1979) is an American professional female bodybuilder.

== Figure career ==
=== Amateur ===
At the age of 16, Monique has been involved in a fitness environment since she purchased her first gym membership. One day she was approached by a trainer who saw potential in her trying a competitive level sport. She then took upon herself to prepare for her first figure show. She competed in the SNBF show in Spartanburg, South Carolina in 2001, which she placed 1st in the overall. In 2007, during her trip to nationals in Charleston, South Carolina, she was approached by the judges who told her she should crossover into bodybuilding, which she accepted.

=== Contest history ===
- 2001 SNBF – 1st (overall)
- 2005 NPC South Carolina State – 1st (class C)
- 2005 NPC Excalibur – South Carolina – 1st (overall and tall)
- 2005 NPC Coastal USA Championships – 1st (class D)
- 2006 NPC Junior USA – 14th (class D)
- 2007 OCB Yorton Cup Nationals – 1st (short and overall)
- 2007 NPC East Coast Tournament of Champions – 4th (class A and masters)
- 2008 NPC USA Championships (figure C) – DNP
- 2009 NPC Great Lakes Grand Prix – 2nd (masters); 3rd (class A)

== Bodybuilding career ==
=== Amateur ===
In 2008, Jones competed in her first bodybuilding competition at the South Carolina State show in Columbia, South Carolina, where she won the overall in women's bodybuilding. At the national realm, she placed 2nd or 3rd for her first three national showings. After placing first in the 2010 IFBB North American Championships, she won her IFBB Pro card.

=== Professional ===
Since 2011, she has qualified for every Ms. Olympia held that year.

=== Contest history ===
- 2008 NPC South Carolina State – 1st (HW and overall)
- 2008 NPC Nationals – 3rd (HW)
- 2008 Junior Nationals – 2nd (HW)
- 2009 IFBB North American Championships – 3rd (HW)
- 2009 NPC Nationals – 3rd (HW)
- 2010 IFBB North American Championships – 1st (HW and overall)
- 2011 IFBB Pro Bodybuilding Weekly Championships – 5th
- 2011 IFBB Ms. Olympia – 9th
- 2011 IFBB Europa Battle of Champions – 2nd
- 2012 IFBB Ms. International – 10th
- 2012 IFBB Europa Battle of Champions – 3rd
- 2012 IFBB WOS Chicago Pro-Am Extravaganza – 1st
- 2012 IFBB Ms. Olympia – 7th
- 2013 IFBB WOS Chicago Pro-Am Extravaganza – 1st
- 2013 IFBB Ms. Olympia – 8th
- 2014 IFBB Tampa Pro – 3rd
- 2015 IFBB Omaha Pro – 2nd
- 2015 IFBB Pro League WOS Rising Phoenix Pro Women's Bodybuilding – 13th
- 2018 IFBB WOS Romania Muscle Fest Pro Women's Bodybuilding – 1st
- 2019 IFBB Pro League WOS Rising Phoenix Pro Women's Bodybuilding – 5th
- 2020 IFBB Pro League WOS Rising Phoenix Pro Women's Bodybuilding - 3rd
- 2020 IFBB WOS Ms. Olympia - 6th

== Personal life ==
Monique currently lives in Greenville, South Carolina. She is a Christian. She is a NPC judge and contest prep coach, Her trainer is Johnny Stewart. She was homeschooled as a child. She has a daughter. Her sponsor company is Species Nutrition.
