= International Federation of Bodybuilding & Fitness Professional League =

Sports governing body federation

- Sport: Professional: bodybuilding (including men's wheelchair), physique, fitness, figure, bikini, wellness, masters and natural (IFBB Pro League Ben Weider Natural Pro only)
- Category: Sports governing body
- Jurisdiction: International
- Abbreviation: IFBB Professional League; IFBB Pro League; IFBB Pro; IFBB
- Founded: 1946 - International Federation of Bodybuilders (IFBB) 1975 - IFBB Professional (Pro) Committee / IFBB Pro Division 2005 - IFBB Pro League
- Affiliation: International Federation of BodyBuilding and Fitness
- Affiliation date: (2005–2017)
- Headquarters: PO Box 789, Carnegie, Pennsylvania 15106, United States
- President: Jim Manion
- Replaced: International Fitness and Bodybuilding Federation
- (founded): 1946

Official website
- www.ifbbpro.com

The International Federation of Bodybuilding & Fitness Professional League (IFBB Pro League) is the largest international professional sports governing body in the world for professional bodybuilding, physique, fitness, figure, bikini, and wellness. A federal organisation, it sanctions the most prestigious competitions in bodybuilding at the Mr. Olympia and Ms. Olympia, as well as the Arnold Sports Festival and Rising Phoenix World Championships.

The natural bodybuilding equivalent to the IFBB is the INBA/PNBA Global as the IFBB, excluding the IFBB Pro League Ben Weider Natural Pro, does not test athletes for steroids or other performance-enhancing drugs.

== History ==
In 1946, the International Federation of Bodybuilders (IFBB) was created. At the 1975 Mr. Universe and IFBB Congress, the IFBB established the IFBB Professional Committee (IFBB Pro Committee; later called the IFBB Professional Division (IFBB Pro Division)) to handle the professional bodybuilding division of the IFBB. In November 2004, International Federation of Bodybuilders Professional Division was renamed the International Federation of Bodybuilding & Fitness Professional Division.

In November 2005, the IFBB Pro Division was split from the IFBB and became the International Federation of Bodybuilding and Fitness Professional League, which was its own legal entity, with its own rules and regulations. The IFBB Constitution became an amateur only sport governing document.

== Amateur affiliation ==
To become an IFBB Pro bodybuilder, one has to come via the route of the NPC. In the USA the NPC is the only route to IFBB Pro status. Internationally, one has to compete in an NPC Worldwide sanctioned show, of which there are various federations internationally with NPC affiliation.

Note there is no longer any affiliation between the IFBB amateur (IFBB) and the IFBB Pro League/NPC. Thus any competitor competing in an IFBB affiliated show have no route to the IFBB Pro League. The IFBB have their own version of professional status known as IFBB Elite Pro. However, even if a competitor holds this distinction, they will still have to come via the route of an NPC show or NPC affiliated show to gain IFBB Pro League status if they one day wish to compete on the Mr. Olympia stage.

== International regional and pro qualifier rules ==
Country	NPC WORLDWIDE Regional or Pro Qualifier application requirement
Argentina; Australia; Austria; Belgium; Bolivia; Brazil; Cambodia; Chile; Colombia; Denmark; Ecuador; Finland; France; Germany; Hungary; India; Indonesia; Italy; Japan; Luxembourg; Malaysia; Mexico; Netherlands; New Zealand; Paraguay; Peru; Philippines; Poland; Portugal; South Africa; South Korea; Singapore; Spain; Republic of China; Thailand; United Kingdom; Uruguay; Vietnam	Regional Certificate requirement
United States	Compete at a National Physique Committee contest not more than one year before competing in an NPC WORLDWIDE Regional or Pro Qualifier contest
Canada	Compete at a Canadian Pro Qualifier contest not more than one year before competing in an NPC WORLDWIDE Regional or Pro Qualifier contest, except for the Arnold Amateur USA

Type of contest	Open to	Minimum number of competitors per division	Number of IFBB Pro Cards awarded per division overall
Regional	Worldwide	N/A	0
National Regional	Host country only	N/A	0
Pro Qualifier	Worldwide	5	1
National Pro Qualifier	Host country only	5	1
Ben Weider WorldWide Classic	Worldwide	5	1
Arnold Amateur (Australia, Brazil, UK)	Worldwide	5	1
Arnold Amateur (USA)	Worldwide	5	1 (Bodybuilding, classic physique, fitness, figure, women's physique and wellness) 2 (Men's physique and bikini)
Amateur Olympia	Worldwide	10 or more 8 – 9 5 – 7 less than 5	3 2 1 0
European Championships	Worldwide	Determined by NPC Worldwide and IFBB Pro League	
European Masters Championships	Worldwide	Determined by NPC Worldwide and IFBB Pro League	
South American Masters Championships	Worldwide	Determined by NPC Worldwide and IFBB Pro League	

== 2023 Olympia qualification system ==
2023 qualification period	Division	2023 Olympia qualified competitors		
21 November 2022 – 9 October 2023	Men's bodybuilding	Top 5 from the 2022 Mr. Olympia	Winner of each Open contest held during the qualification period	
21 November 2022 – 9 October 2023	Women's bodybuilding, physique, fitness, figure, bikini and wellness	Top 3 from all other 2022 Olympia divisions	Winner of each Open contest held during the qualification period	
21 November 2022 – 9 October 2023	Wheelchair bodybuilding	Top 3 from all other 2022 Olympia divisions	Winner of each Open contest held during the qualification period	
21 November 2022 – 9 October 2023	Wheelchair bodybuilding	Top 3 from all other 2022 Olympia divisions	Winner of each Open contest held during the qualification period	Top 5 in the Points Standing

2023 Wheelchair bodybuilding points system
Points Standing Contests	Points
Arnold Classic (USA); Arnold Classic South America (Brazil); Toronto Pro Supershow; Dallas Pro; T.R.U. Athlete ISFF (UK)	2nd – 10 points; 3rd – 9 points; 4th – 8 points; 5th – 7 points

Note: Any former Olympia winner has lifetime eligibility, but after more than 5 years since their last Olympia win, approval of the IFBB Professional League is required.

== See also ==
- National Physique Committee
- Mr. Olympia
- Ms. Olympia
- Arnold Sports Festival
- Ms. International
- Rising Phoenix World Championships

== Ref ==
- Jim Manion’s Pro League athlete membership rules cause controversy
- Jim Manion’s NPC promoter’s contract is allegedly anticompetitive
- Official website
