= Alina Popa =

Romanian-born bodybuilder

- Professional bodybuilder
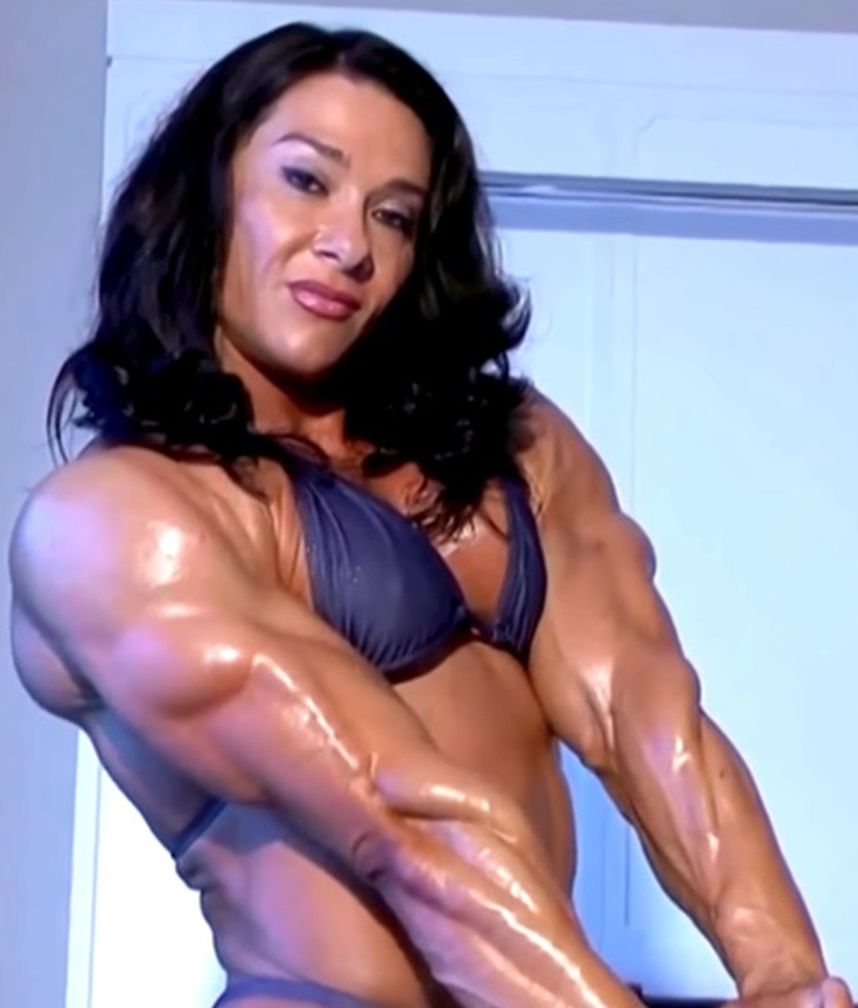

Personal info
- Nickname: The Romanian Queen of Bodybuilding
- Born: October 12, 1978 (age 47); Brăila, Socialist Republic of Romania

Best statistics
- Height: 5 ft 6 in (1.68 m)
- Weight: In Season: 160–165 lb (73–75 kg); Off-Season: 180–185 lb (82–84 kg)

Professional (Pro) career
- Pro-debut: IFBB Ms. International; 2010
- Best win: IFBB WOS Rising Phoenix World Championships overall champion; 2018
- Predecessor: Helle Trevino
- Successor: Helle Trevino
- Active: 2010-2018

Alina Evelina Popa (born October 12, 1978) is a Romanian former professional female bodybuilder currently living in the United States.

== Early life and education ==
Popa grew up Brăila, Romania. From the age of 12, she competed in track and field, initially to lose weight. n 1997, she graduated Lic Th Gh. Munteanu-Murgoci Brăila. She studied English, Romanian, majoring in the former with a teaching degree, and literature at the University of Galați, where she was part of the Galati University "Dănărea de Jos" Sports Club and graduated in 2002. She studied Culinary arts at the Auguste Escoffier School of Culinary Arts and graduated in 2015.

== Bodybuilding career ==
=== Amateur ===
At 18, Alina entered a gym in Brăila just to keep fit and lose some weight, but immediately fell in love with bodybuilding. In 1998, she began to read bodybuilding magazines. There was one female in the gym getting ready for the National Junior Championship and she felt admiration for her and wished she had her muscles. She kept on training for the next two years until one day she entered another gym in another town, where she was a student, and the trainer there saw her potential and suggested to her she should train to compete.

In 1998, a gym owner suggested she compete in fitness. She started training to compete in fitness. However, immediately as she gained muscle, her trainer said they were too muscular for the division and that they should compete as a bodybuilder. Her role model was Lenda Murray. She competing for Romania till 2005, then in 2006 she moved to Switzerland and competed for Switzerland. In 2008, she received her IFBB pro card after winning the overall and heavyweight at the 2008 Worlds Santa Susanna.

=== Professional ===
At the 2010 Ms. International, Alina had her pro debut, where she placed 8th. In 2011, Dylan Armbrust, owner of Armbrust Pro Gym and former husband of professional bodybuilder Heather Armbrust, asked Alina for an autograph and she moved to Colorado to train with Dylan at the Armbrust Pro Gym. At the 2011 Ms. International, she placed 3rd and qualified for her first Ms. Olympia. At the 2011 Ms. Olympia, she placed 5th. At the 2012 Ms. International, she placed 3rd. At the 2012 Ms. Olympia, she placed 4th.

Alina decided sit out the 2013 Ms. International in order to focus on the 2013 Ms. Olympia. At the 2013 Ms. Olympia, she placed 2nd. In 2014, she began being sponsored by Supplement Giant and at the 2014 Ms. Olympia, she placed 2nd again. In 2015, due to injuries, she did not participate in the 2015 Rising Phoenix World Championships. She returned to competing in 2016 and at the 2016 Rising Phoenix World Championships, she placed 3rd. In 2018, she won her first IFBB Pro League contest, the Muscle Vodka Tampa Pro. At the 2018 Rising Phoenix World Championships, she won the Ms. Rising Phoenix title and retired from bodybuilding.

=== Legacy ===
Since November 1, 2018, Alina has been Vice President of European Operations & Athletes' Rep of Wings of Strength. She promotes three IFBB Pro League contests—the Alina Popa Classic Pro, the Romania Muscle Fest Pro and the Masters Olympia.

=== Contest history ===
- 2000 Regional Cup - 2nd (HW)
- 2000 IFBB National Championship - 3rd (HW)
- 2003 IFBB National Championship - 1st (MW)
- 2004 IFBB European Championship - 2nd (HW)
- 2005 Mixed Pairs European Championship - 2nd
- 2005 Women's European Championship - 5th
- 2006 Grand Prix Due Torri - 1st
- 2007 NABBA Miss Universe - 1st (Miss Physique class)
- 2008 IFBB Worlds Santa Susanna - 1st (Overall and HW)
- 2010 IFBB Ms. International - 8th
- 2011 IFBB Ms. International - 3rd
- 2011 IFBB Ms. Olympia - 5th
- 2012 IFBB Ms. International - 3rd
- 2012 IFBB Ms. Olympia - 4th
- 2013 IFBB Ms. Olympia - 2nd
- 2014 IFBB Ms. Olympia - 2nd
- 2016 WOS Rising Phoenix World Championships - 3rd
- 2018 IFBB Muscle Vodka Tampa Pro - 1st
- 2018 Rising Phoenix World Championships - 1st

=== Best statistics ===
- Back - 47 inches (120 cm)
- Bench press - 242 lb (110 kg) x 4-6 reps
- Bicep curls - 65 lb (29 kg) each arm x 3 reps
- Calves - 17 inches (43 cm)
- Chest - 47 inches (120 cm)
- Deadlift - 308 lb (140 kg) x 8 reps
- On season biceps - 17 inches (43 cm)
- On season thighs - 26 inches (66 cm)
- On season weight - 160–165 lb (73–75 kg)
- Quads - 28 inches (71 cm)
- Squats - 375 lb (170 kg) x 4-6 reps

== Personal life ==
Popa currently lives in Phoenix, Arizona, and she is divorced. Since November 1, 2018, Alina has been Vice President of European Operations & Athletes' Rep of Wings of Strength.
