= Talking Stick Resort =

Indian-owned hotel and casino in Arizona

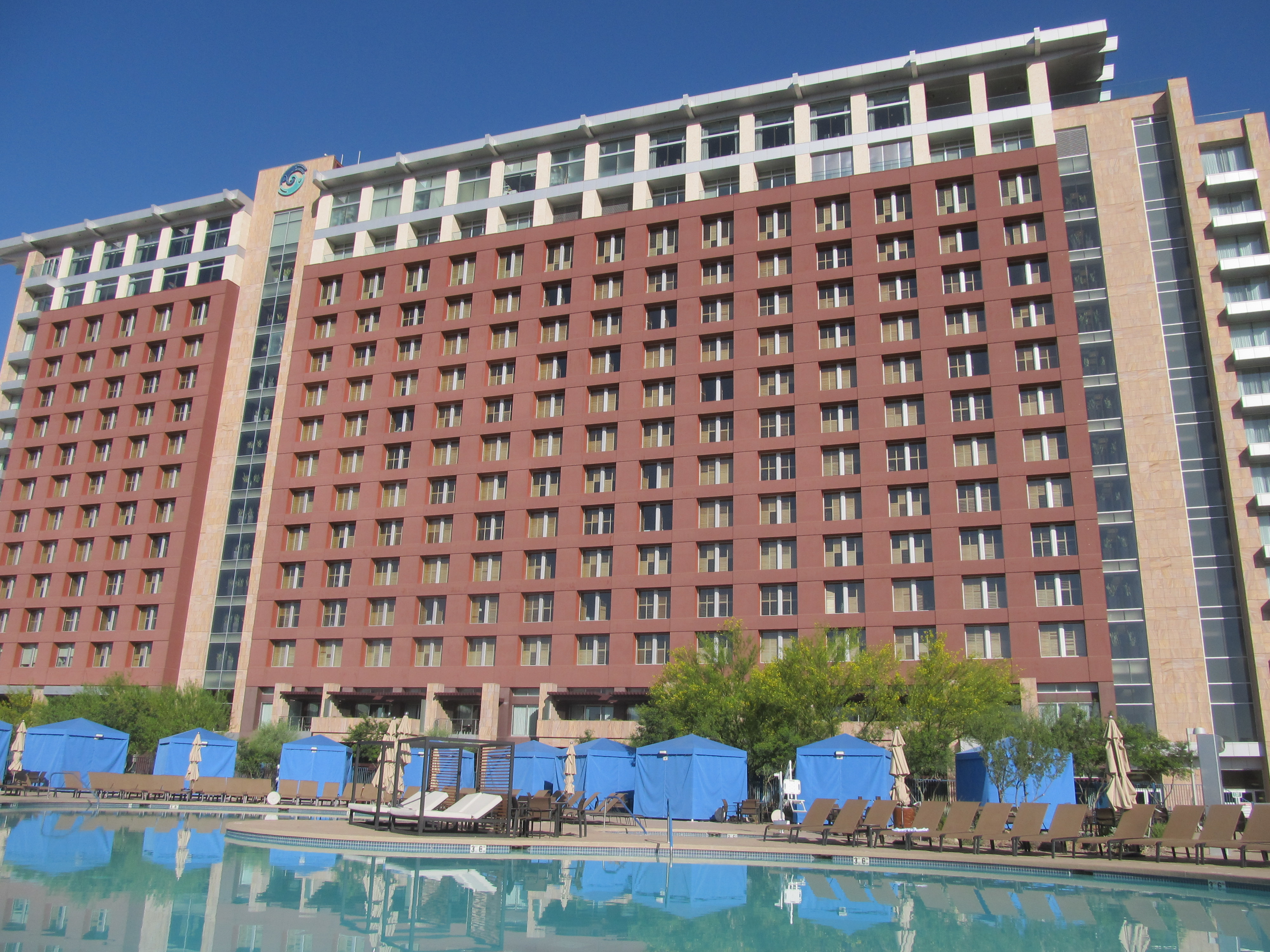
- Interactive map of Talking Stick Resort
- Location: 9800 E Talking Stick Way Scottsdale, Arizona 85256; 33.540517°N 111.869773°W
- Opened: April 15, 2010
- No. of rooms: 496
- Gaming space: 98,000 sq ft
- Owner: Salt River Pima-Maricopa Indian Community
- Architect: FFKR Architects
- Previous names: Casino Arizona 101 & Indian Bend
- Website: www.talkingstickresort.com

Talking Stick Resort is a luxury hotel and casino resort located on the Salt-River Pima Maricopa Indian Reservation near Scottsdale, Arizona, United States. The hotel tower, which was designed by FFKR Architects, has 15 stories and stands at 200.5 feet (61.1 m). Talking Stick Resort is independently owned and operated by the Salt River Pima-Maricopa Indian Community (SRPMIC).

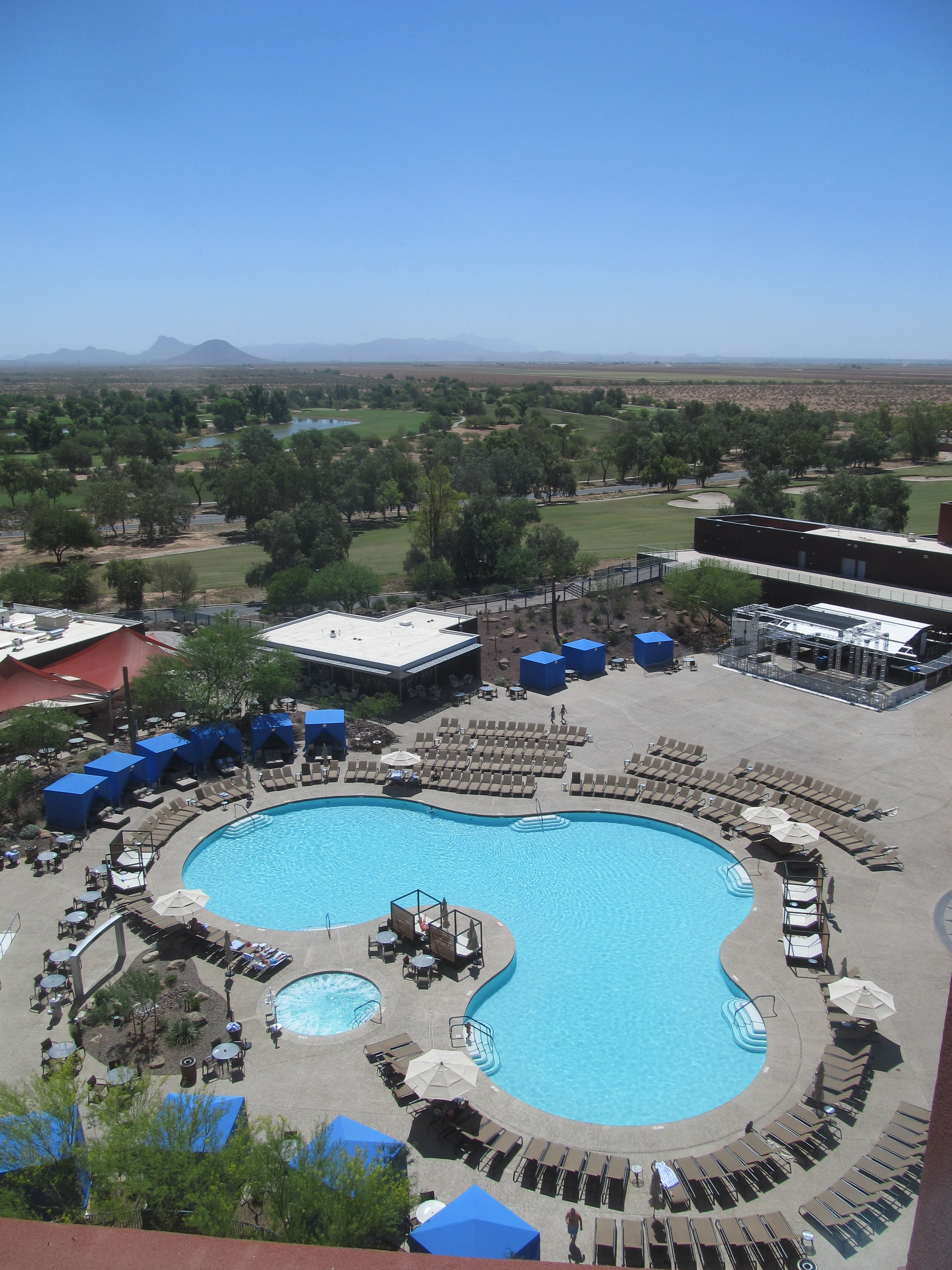
View of the pool from the 9th floor, east side of the resort

In total, Talking Stick Resort occupies 55.6 acres (22.5 ha) with an additional 20 acres (8.1 ha) for extra parking space. The 240,000 square feet (22,000 m^{2}) property includes a 98,000 square feet (9,100 m^{2}) casino, 496 guest rooms, 21 meeting rooms, six entertainment lounges and five restaurants. It also contains a 25,000 square feet (2,300 m^{2}) Grand Ballroom, a spa spanning 13,000 square feet, a fitness center, Showroom that seats 650 and four pools. In April 2014, Talking Stick Resort renovated its pool area, adding a new lounge pool and a stage for outdoor concerts. Entertainers who have performed on the poolside stage include Journey, Foreigner, Bad Company and Hollywood Vampires. In addition to Talking Stick Resort's headline concerts, the RELEASE Pool Parties have also attracted an array of world renowned DJs including Kaskade, Steve Aoki, and Skrillex.

== History ==
Prior to opening as Talking Stick Resort, the land was the location of Casino Arizona 101 & Talking Stick Way. It opened in 1999 with 332 slot machines and 45 table games. In 2003, the property was expanded to include blackjack, poker, keno, and a sports bar.

In September 2006, ground was broken at the future site of Talking Stick Resort. Phoenix-based company Chanen Construction Company, Inc. led construction of the project.

Casino Arizona 101 & Indian Bend remained open throughout construction until the resort's opening. The temporary structure that housed Casino Arizona was then auctioned, as were the majority of its contents.

On April 15, 2010, Talking Stick Resort opened on the former site of Casino Arizona at 101 and Talking Stick Way. An official grand opening took place on June 10.

On August 11, 2018, a massive monsoon storm flooded Talking Stick Resort Casino's generator, backup generator, and portions of the hotel and casino, forcing all guests to evacuate immediately. It remained entirely closed while cleanup and power restoration efforts took place. The resort reopened more than a month later, on September 24, 2018.

== Hotel ==
The hotel houses 496 deluxe rooms with 15 luxury suites and 30 executive king suites. The architectural design of Talking Stick Resort mirrors the Salt River Pima-Maricopa Indian Community through the use of native stones, plants and earth-tone color schemes.

== Gaming ==
Talking Stick Resort’s gaming floor covers 98,000 square feet. It includes more than 850 slot machines, 54 tables of Blackjack, Three Card Poker, Craps, Roulette, Pai Gow, Ultimate Texas Hold'Em, Let It Ride and Lucky Ladies.

Talking Stick Resort is home to the ARENA Poker Room that features 49 poker tables including Texas Hold ‘Em, 7-Card Stud and Omaha. The ARENA Poker Room also hosts the annual Arizona State Poker Championship and Arizona State Ladies Poker Championship. Talking Stick Resort also offers Keno games in its Keno hall.

== Shows ==
Prior to the opening of Talking Stick Resort, Casino Arizona 101 & Talking Stick Way was the first gaming facility to produce and televise its own sports show titled, “We’ve Got Your Game.” The show went on to air more than 200 episodes and featured such sports figures as Troy Aikman, Amar'e Stoudemire, Steve Nash, Kyle Petty, Mike Tyson and Mike Ditka. Since 2011, Talking Stick Resort has been the host of Phoenix Fashion Week.

== Attractions ==
Talking Stick Resort has six restaurants throughout the facility including Orange Sky, Ocean Trail, Blue Coyote Café, Blue Coyote Cantina, Tash and Black Fig Bistro. There is also a Cultural Center in the hotel lobby that features Native American artworks, photographs, paintings and jewelry that reflect the Pima and Maricopa Indian heritages.

The property is located in the Talking Stick Entertainment District. Other nearby attractions include Talking Stick Resort Golf Club, the Pavilions at Talking Stick Resort, Butterfly Wonderland, and Major League Baseball's newest spring training complex, Salt River Fields at Talking Stick, which opened in 2011 and is the spring base of the Arizona Diamondbacks and the Colorado Rockies. On December 2, 2014, the venue purchased the naming rights of the former U.S. Airways Center and re-branded it as the Talking Stick Resort Arena in 2015.

== See also ==
- List of casinos in Arizona
