= 2012 Ms. Olympia =

Professional bodybuilding competition

- Promotion: IFBB
- Date: September 28, 2012
- Venue: South Hall in the Las Vegas Convention Center and Orleans Arena at The Orleans Hotel and Casino
- City: Winchester and Paradise, Nevada, United States

Event chronology
2011 Ms. Olympia	2012 Ms. Olympia	2013 Ms. Olympia

The 2012 Ms. Olympia contest was an IFBB professional bodybuilding competition and part of Joe Weider's Olympia Fitness & Performance Weekend 2012 was held on September 28, 2012, at the South Hall in the Las Vegas Convention Center in Winchester, Nevada and in the Orleans Arena at The Orleans Hotel and Casino in Paradise, Nevada. It was the 33rd Ms. Olympia competition held. Other events at the exhibition included the 212 Olympia Showdown, Mr. Olympia, Fitness Olympia, Figure Olympia, and Bikini Olympia contests.

== Prize money ==
- 1st - $28,000
- 2nd - $14,000
- 3rd - $8,000
- 4th - $5,000
- 5th - $3,000
- 6th - $2,000

Total: $60,000

== Rounds ==
- Prejudging Round: Combined the assessment of symmetry, muscularity, and conditioning. Judges evaluated the contestants' overall balance, proportion, muscle size, and definition.
- Finals Round: The posing routine, where contestants presented choreographed routines to music, emphasizing creativity and presentation. The final posedown allowed for direct comparison among the top contestants.

== Results ==
- 1st - Iris Kyle
- 2nd - Debi Laszewski
- 3rd - Yaxeni Oriquen-Garcia
- 4th - Alina Popa
- 5th - Brigita Brezovac
- 6th - Sheila Bleck
- 7th - Monique Jones
- 8th - Anne Freitas
- 9th - Michelle Cummings
- 10th - Sarah Hayes
- 11th - Kim Buck
- 12th - Helle Trevino
- 13th - Lisa Giesbrecht

Comparison to previous Olympia results:

- Same - Iris Kyle
- +2 - Debi Laszewski
- -1 - Yaxeni Oriquen-Garcia
- +1 - Alina Popa
- -2 - Brigita Brezovac
- Same - Sheila Bleck
- +2 - Monique Jones
- +2 - Helle Trevino

=== Scorecard ===
No	NAME	COUNTRY	JUDGING	FINALS	TOTAL	PLACE
1	Sheila Bleck	USA	35	32	67	6
2	Brigita Brezovac	Slovenia	20	21	41	5
3	Kim Buck	USA	54	55	109	11
4	Michelle Cummings	USA	47	44	91	9
5	Anne Luise Freitas	Brazil	37	35	72	8
6	Lisa Giesbrecht	Canada	62	63	125	13
7	Sarah Hayes	USA	50	50	100	10
8	Monique Jones	USA	31	40	71	7
9	Debi Laszewski	USA	9	10	19	2
10	Helle Nielsen	Denmark	61	61	123	12
11	Yaxeni Oriquen-Garcia	Venezuela	15	24	39	3
12	Alina Popa	Switzerland	25	15	40	4
13	Iris Kyle	USA	6	5	11	1
Sandy Williamson IFBB PROFESSIONAL LEAGUE			September 28, 2012 DATE			

== Attended ==
- 15th Ms. Olympia attended - Yaxeni Oriquen-Garcia
- 14th Ms. Olympia attended - Iris Kyle
- 4th Ms. Olympia attended - Debi Laszewski
- 3rd Ms. Olympia attended - Sheila Bleck and Helle Trevino
- 2nd Ms. Olympia attended - Brigita Brezovac, Kim Buck, Monique Jones, and Alina Popa
- 1st Ms. Olympia attended - Sarah Hayes, Lisa Giesbrecht, Michelle Cummings, and Anne Freitas
- Previous year Olympia attendees who did not attend - Dayana Cadeau, Cathy LeFrançois, Heather Foster, Tina Chandler, Nicole Ball, Kim Perez, Mah Ann Mendoza, and Skadi Frei-Seifert

== Notable events ==
- This was Iris Kyle's 8th overall Olympia win, thus tied her with Lenda Murray for the most overall Ms. Olympia wins. This was also Iris's 7th consecutive Ms. Olympia win, breaking the record of six consecutive wins she shared with Lenda Murray and Cory Everson.
- Debi Lazewski placed 2nd this Olympia, the best placing she has ever had at the Olympia.
- Although Cathy LeFrançois qualified for the 2012 Ms. Olympia, she didn't find out she qualified until 6 weeks until the Olympia and thus did not attend.
- This is the first Ms. Olympia to have the defending Ms. Olympia last numerically among the contestants.

== 2012 Ms. Olympia Qualified ==
Name	Country	How Qualified
Iris Kyle	(United States)	2011 Ms. Olympia 1st
Yaxeni Oriquen-Garcia	(Venezuela)	2011 Ms. Olympia 2nd
Brigita Brezovac	(Slovenia)	2011 Ms. Olympia 3rd
Debi Laszewski	(United States)	2011 Ms. Olympia 4th
Alina Popa	(Romania)	2011 Ms. Olympia 5th
Lisa Giesbrecht	(Canada)	2012 Toronto Pro Supershow 1st
Anne Freitas	(Brazil)	2012 Battle of Champions 1st
Monique Jones	(United States)	2012 Wings of Strength Chicago Pro-Am Extravaganza 1st
Sarah Hayes	(United States)	2012 Pro Bodybuilding Weekly Championships 1st
Kim Buck	(United States)	2012 Ms. International 5th 2012 Toronto Pro Supershow 2nd
Michelle Cummings	(United States)	2012 Battle of Champions 2nd 2012 Wings of Strength Chicago Pro-Am Extravaganza 3rd
Cathy LeFrancois	(Canada)	2012 Ms. International 4th
Sheila Bleck	(United States)	2012 Pro Bodybuilding Weekly Championships 2nd
Helle Trevino	(United States)	2012 Wings of Strength Chicago Pro-Am Extravaganza 2nd

=== Points standings ===
Ranking^{1}	Name	Country	Points
1	Kim Buck	(United States)	9
2	Michelle Cummings	(United States)	7
3	Cathy LeFrancois	(Canada)	6
4	Sheila Bleck	(United States)	4
4	Helle Trevino	(United States)	4
4	Tazzie Columb	(United States)	4
7	Wendy McCready	(United Kingdom)	3
7	Janeen Lankowski	(Canada)	3
9	Gillian Kovack	(Canada)	2
9	Melody Spetko	(Canada)	2
11	Laura Carolan	(Canada)	1
11	Emery Miller	(United States)	1
11	Kim Perez	(United States)	1

^{1} In the event of a tie, the competitor with the best top five contest placings will be awarded the qualification. If both competitors have the same contest placings, than both will qualify for the Olympia.

== See also ==
- 2012 Mr. Olympia
