= 2014 Ms. Olympia =

Women's professional bodybuilding competition

- Promotion: IFBB
- Date: September 19, 2014
- Venue: South Hall in the Las Vegas Convention Center and Orleans Arena at The Orleans Hotel and Casino
- City: Winchester and Paradise, Nevada, United States

Event chronology
| 2013 Ms. Olympia | 2014 Ms. Olympia | 2020 Ms. Olympia |

The 2014 Ms. Olympia contest is an IFBB professional bodybuilding competition and part of Joe Weider's Olympia Fitness & Performance Weekend 2014 was held on September 19, 2014, at the South Hall in the Las Vegas Convention Center in Winchester, Nevada and in the Orleans Arena at The Orleans Hotel and Casino in Paradise, Nevada. It was the 35th Ms. Olympia competition held. Other events at the exhibition include the 212 Olympia Showdown, Mr. Olympia, Fitness Olympia, Figure Olympia, Bikini Olympia, Women's Physique Showdown, and Men's Physique Showdown contests.

== Prize money ==
- 1st - $22,000
- 2nd - $12,000
- 3rd - $6,000
- 4th - $5,000
- 5th - $3,000
- 6th - $2,000

Total: $50,000

== Rounds ==
- Prejudging Round: Judges evaluated contestants on symmetry, muscularity, and conditioning, focusing on overall physique balance, proportion, muscle size, and definition.
- Finals Round: Contestants presented their choreographed posing routines to music, emphasizing creativity, presentation, and stage presence. The final posedown followed, allowing for direct comparisons among the top contestants.

== Results ==
- 1st - Iris Kyle
- 2nd - Alina Popa
- 3rd - Debi Laszewski
- 4th - Alana Shipp
- 5th - Yaxeni Oriquen-Garcia
- 6th - Anne Freitas
- 7th - Sheila Bleck
- 8th - Jennifer Sedia
- 9th - Maria Rita Bello
- 10th - Margie Martin
- 11th - Christine Envall
- 12th - Lisa Giesbrecht
- 13th - Simone Oliveira

Comparison to previous Olympia results:

- Same - Iris Kyle
- Same - Alina Popa
- Same - Debi Laszewski
- -1 - Yaxeni Oriquen-Garcia
- +3 - Anne Freitas
- -1 - Sheila Bleck
- +2 - Jennifer Sedia
- +2 - Maria Rita Bello
- +1 - Lisa Giesbrecht

=== Scorecard ===
| No | NAME | COUNTRY | JUDGING | FINALS | TOTAL | PLACE |
|---|---|---|---|---|---|---|
| 1 | Rita Bello | Argentina | 41 | 45 | 86 | 9 |
| 2 | Sheila Bleck | USA | 32 | 33 | 65 | 7 |
| 3 | Christine Envall | Australia | 57 | 52 | 109 | 11 |
| 4 | Anne Freitas | Brazil | 23 | 34 | 57 | 6 |
| 5 | Yaxeni Oriquen-Garcia | Venezuela | 31 | 20 | 51 | 5 |
| 6 | Lisa Giesbrecht | Canada | 58 | 61 | 119 | 12 |
| 7 | Debi Laszewski | USA | 17 | 15 | 32 | 3 |
| 8 | Margie Martin | USA | 52 | 53 | 105 | 10 |
| 9 | Simone Oliveira | Brazil | 63 | 63 | 126 | 13 |
| 10 | Alina Popa | Romania | 10 | 10 | 20 | 2 |
| 11 | Jennifer Sedia | USA | 44 | 37 | 81 | 8 |
| 12 | Alana Shipp | USA | 20 | 25 | 45 | 4 |
| 13 | Iris Kyle | USA | 5 | 5 | 10 | 1 |

== Attended ==
- 17th Ms. Olympia attended - Yaxeni Oriquen-Garcia
- 16th Ms. Olympia attended - Iris Kyle
- 6th Ms. Olympia attended - Debi Laszewski
- 4th Ms. Olympia attended - Sheila Bleck and Alina Popa
- 3rd Ms. Olympia attended - Anne Freitas
- 2nd Ms. Olympia attended - Maria Rita Bello, Lisa Giesbrecht, and Jennifer Sedia
- 1st Ms. Olympia attended - Christine Envall, Margaret Martin, Simone Oliveira, and Alana Shipp
- Previous year Olympia attendees who did not attend - Jennifer Abshire, Juanita Blaino, Brigita Brezovac, Tina Chandler, Monique Jones, Tammy Jones, and Cathy LeFrançois

== Notable events ==
- This was Iris Kyle's 10th overall Olympia win, thus breaking her own previous world record of nine overall Olympia wins. This makes her the most successful professional bodybuilder in the history of both male and female professional bodybuilding. This was also Iris's 9th consecutive Ms. Olympia win, thus surpassing Ronnie Coleman and Lee Haney record of eight consecutive Olympia wins.
- Iris announced after her 10th overall Olympia win that she will be retiring from bodybuilding.
- The top three, Iris, Alina Popa and Debi Laszewski, repeated their top three placings from the 2013 Ms. Olympia, which was a first in Ms. Olympia history.
- This was the last Ms. Olympia until the 2020 Ms. Olympia.

== 2014 Ms. Olympia Qualified ==
| Name | Country | How Qualified |
|---|---|---|
| Iris Kyle | (United States) | 2013 Ms. Olympia 1st |
| Alina Popa | (Romania) | 2013 Ms. Olympia 2nd |
| Debi Laszewski | (United States) | 2013 Ms. Olympia 3rd |
| Yaxeni Oriquen-Garcia | (Venezuela) | 2013 Ms. Olympia 4th |
| Brigita Brezovac | (Slovenia) | 2013 Ms. Olympia 5th |
| Simone Oliveira | (Brazil) | 2014 Toronto Pro Supershow 1st |
| Anne Freitas | (Brazil) | 2014 Omaha Pro 1st |
| Maria Rita Bello | (Argentina) | 2014 Wings of Strength Chicago Pro-Am Extravaganza 1st |
| Sheila Bleck | (United States) | 2014 Pro Bodybuilding Weekly Championships 1st |
| Margie Martin | (United States) | 2014 Toronto Pro Supershow 4th 2014 Omaha Pro 2nd |
| Christine Envall | (Australia) | 2014 Toronto Pro Supershow 6th 2014 Omaha Pro 3rd 2014 Wings of Strength Chicago Pro 3rd |
| Alana Shipp | (United States) | 2014 Toronto Pro Supershow 2nd 2014 Omaha Pro 5th |
| Lisa Giesbrecht | (Canada) | 2014 Toronto Pro Supershow 5th 2014 Wings of Strength Chicago Pro 2nd |
| Jennifer Sedia | (United States) | 2014 Pro Bodybuilding Weekly Championships 2nd |

=== Points standings ===
| Ranking^{1} | Name | Country | Points |
|---|---|---|---|
| 1 | Margie Martin | (United States) | 6 |
| 1 | Christine Envall | (Australia) | 6 |
| 2 | Alana Shipp | (United States) | 5 |
| 2 | Lisa Giesbrecht | (Canada) | 5 |
| 3 | Jennifer Sedia | (United States) | 4 |
| 3 | Virginia Sanchez | (Spain) | 3 |
| 3 | Monique Jones | (United States) | 3 |
| 4 | Tonia Moore | (United States) | 2 |
| 4 | Juanita Blaino | (United States) | 2 |
| 4 | Kahla Bullemor | (Australia) | 2 |
| 5 | Emery Miller | (United States) | 1 |
| 5 | Melody Spetko | (United States) | 1 |

^{1} In the event of a tie, the competitor with the best top five contest placings will be awarded the qualification. If both competitors have the same contest placings, than both will qualify for the Olympia.

== See also ==
- 2014 Mr. Olympia
