= 2013 Ms. Olympia =

Women's professional bodybuilding competition

- Promotion: IFBB
- Date: September 27, 2013
- Venue: South Hall in the Las Vegas Convention Center and Orleans Arena at The Orleans Hotel and Casino
- City: Winchester and Paradise, Nevada, United States

Event chronology
2012 Ms. Olympia	2013 Ms. Olympia	2014 Ms. Olympia

The 2013 Ms. Olympia contest is an IFBB professional bodybuilding competition and part of Joe Weider's Olympia Fitness & Performance Weekend 2013 to be held on September 27, 2013, at the South Hall in the Las Vegas Convention Center in Winchester, Nevada and in the Orleans Arena at The Orleans Hotel and Casino in Paradise, Nevada. It was the 34th Ms. Olympia competition held. Other events at the exhibition include the 212 Olympia Showdown, Mr. Olympia, Fitness Olympia, Figure Olympia, Bikini Olympia, Women's Physique Showdown, and Men's Physique Showdown contests.

== Prize money ==
- 1st - $28,000
- 2nd - $14,000
- 3rd - $8,000
- 4th - $5,000
- 5th - $3,000
- 6th - $2,000

Total: $60,000

== Rounds ==
- Prejudging Round: Judges assessed contestants on symmetry, muscularity, and conditioning. This round focused on overall balance, proportion, and muscle definition.
- Finals Round: Contestants performed their choreographed posing routines to music, showcasing creativity, presentation skills, and stage presence. The final posedown followed, allowing direct comparison among the top contestants.

== Results ==
- 1st - Iris Kyle
- 2nd - Alina Popa
- 3rd - Debi Laszewski
- 4th - Yaxeni Oriquen-Garcia
- 5th - Brigita Brezovac
- 6th - Juanita Blaino
- 7th - Jennifer Abshire
- 8th - Monique Jones
- 9th - Anne Freitas
- 10th - Cathy LeFrançois
- 11th - Maria Rita Bello
- 12th - Tina Chandler
- DNF - Tammy Jones

Comparison to previous Olympia results:

- Same - Iris Kyle
- +2 - Alina Popa
- -1 - Debi Laszewski
- -1 - Yaxeni Oriquen-Garcia
- Same - Brigita Brezovac
- -1 - Monique Jones
- -1 - Anne Freitas
- +3 - Cathy LeFrançois
- -2 - Tina Chandler

=== Scorecard ===
No	NAME	COUNTRY	JUDGING	FINALS	TOTAL	PLACE
1	Jennifer Abshire	USA			76	7
2	Rita Bello	Argentina			111	11
3	Juanita Blaino	USA			57	6
4	Brigita Brezovac	Slovenia			46	5
5	Tina Chandler	USA			124	12
6	Anne Freitas	Brazil			89	9
7	Monique Jones	USA			82	8
8	Tammy Jones	USA			DNF ^{1}	DNF
9	Debi Laszewski	USA			37	3
10	Cathy LeFrancois	Canada			103	10
11	Yaxeni Oriquen-Garcia	Venezuela			38	4
12	Alina Popa	Switzerland			20	2
13	Iris Kyle	USA			10	1
Sandy Williamson IFBB PROFESSIONAL LEAGUE			September 27, 2013 DATE			

^{1} Did not finish

== Attended ==
- 16th Ms. Olympia attended - Yaxeni Oriquen-Garcia
- 15th Ms. Olympia attended - Iris Kyle
- 6th Ms. Olympia attended - Cathy LeFrançois
- 5th Ms. Olympia attended - Debi Laszewski
- 4th Ms. Olympia attended - Tina Chandler
- 3rd Ms. Olympia attended - Brigita Brezovac, Monique Jones, and Alina Popa
- 2nd Ms. Olympia attended - Anne Freitas
- 1st Ms. Olympia attended - Jennifer Abshire, Maria Bello, Juanita Blaino, and Tammy Jones
- Previous year Olympia attendees who did not attend - Sheila Bleck, Kim Buck, Lisa Giesbrecht, Sarah Hayes, and Helle Trevino

== Notable events ==
- This was Iris Kyle's ninth overall Olympia win, thus breaking the record of eight overall Olympia wins she shared with Lenda Murray. She also surpassed the eight overall Mr. Olympia wins held by Lee Haney and Ronnie Coleman. This makes her the most successful professional bodybuilder in the history of both male and female professional bodybuilding. This was also Iris's eighth consecutive Ms. Olympia win.
- Alina Popa placed second in this Olympia, the best placing she has had.
- This was Brigita Brezovac's last Olympia before she retired from bodybuilding.

== 2013 Ms. Olympia qualified ==
Name	Country	Qualified via
Iris Kyle	(United States)	2012 Ms. Olympia 1st
Debi Laszewski	(United States)	2012 Ms. Olympia 2nd
Yaxeni Oriquen-Garcia	(Venezuela)	2012 Ms. Olympia 3rd
Alina Popa	(Romania)	2012 Ms. Olympia 4th
Brigita Brezovac	(Slovenia)	2012 Ms. Olympia 5th
Jennifer Scarpetta	(United States)	2013 Toronto Pro Supershow 1st
Monique Jones	(United States)	2013 Wings of Strength Chicago Pro-Am Extravaganza 1st
Tammy Jones	(United States)	2013 Pro Bodybuilding Weekly Championships 1st
Maria Rita Bello	(Argentina)	2013 Toronto Pro Supershow 3rd 2013 Pro Bodybuilding Weekly Championships 2nd
Cathy LeFrancois	(Canada)	2013 Ms. International 5th
Tina Chandler	(United States)	2013 Wings of Strength Chicago Pro-Am Extravaganza 3rd 2013 Pro Bodybuilding Weekly Championships 4th
Anne Freitas	(Brazil)	2013 Toronto Pro Supershow 2nd
Juanita Blaino	(United States)	2013 Wings of Strength Chicago Pro-Am Extravaganza 2nd

=== Points standings ===
Ranking^{1}	Name	Country	Points
1	Maria Rita Bello	(Argentina)	7
2	Cathy LeFrancois	(Canada)	5
2	Tina Chandler	(United States)	5
4	Anne Freitas	(Brazil)	4
4	Juanita Blaino	(United States)	4
6	Tonia Moore	(United States)	3
7	Melody Spetko	(Canada)	2
7	Rene Campbell	(United Kingdom)	2
9	Michelle Cummings	(United States)	1
9	Nancy Clark	(Canada)	1
9	Helle Trevino	(United States)	1

^{1} In the event of a tie, the competitor with the best top five contest placings is awarded the qualification. If both competitors have the same contest placings, then both qualify.

== See also ==
- 2013 Mr. Olympia
