= 2010 Ms. Olympia =

Women's professional bodybuilding competition

- Promotion: IFBB
- Date: September 24, 2010
- Venue: South Hall in the Las Vegas Convention Center and Orleans Arena at The Orleans Hotel and Casino
- City: Winchester and Paradise, Nevada, United States

Event chronology
2009 Ms. Olympia	2010 Ms. Olympia	2011 Ms. Olympia

The 2010 Ms. Olympia was an IFBB professional bodybuilding competition and part of Joe Weider's Olympia Fitness & Performance Weekend 2010 was held on September 24, 2010, at the South Hall in the Las Vegas Convention Center in Winchester, Nevada and in the Orleans Arena at The Orleans Hotel and Casino in Paradise, Nevada. It was the 31st Ms. Olympia competition held. Other events at the exhibition included the 202 Olympia Showdown, Mr. Olympia, Fitness Olympia, Figure Olympia, and Bikini Olympia contests.

== Prize money ==
- 1st - $28,000
- 2nd - $14,000
- 3rd - $8,000
- 4th - $5,000
- 5th - $3,000
- 6th - $2,000

Total: $60,000

== Rounds ==
- Prejudging Round: Combined the evaluation of symmetry, muscularity, and conditioning. Contestants were judged on their overall physique, including balance, proportion, muscle size, and definition.
- Finals Round: The posing routine and the final posedown. Contestants presented their choreographed routines to music, showcasing their presentation skills, followed by a posedown among the top finalists.

== Results ==
- 1st - Iris Kyle
- 2nd - Yaxeni Oriquen-Garcia
- 3rd - Debi Laszewski
- 4th - Sheila Bleck
- 5th - Dayana Cadeau
- 6th - Heather Foster
- 7th - Cathy LeFrançois
- 8th - Tina Chandler
- 9th - Helen Bouchard
- 10th - Brigita Brezovac
- 11th - Zoa Linsey

Comparison to previous Olympia results:

- Same - Iris Kyle
- +3 - Yaxeni Oriquen-Garcia
- Same - Debi Laszewski
- +3 - Dayana Cadeau
- +6 - Heather Foster
- +1 - Cathy LeFrançois
- +2 - Tina Chandler

=== Scorecard ===
Athletes' name	Country	Pre judging	Place	Pose down	Total	Place
1 Sheila Bleck	US	20	4	20	40	4
2 Helen Bouchard	Canada	46	9			
3 Brigita Brezovac	Slovenia	49	9			
4 Dayana Cadeau	US	29	5	23	52	5
5 Tina Chandler	US	46	8			
6 Heather Foster	US	30	6	25	55	6
7 Iris Kyle	US	5	1	5	10	1
8 Debi Laszewski	US	15	3	15	30	3
9 Cathy LeFrancois	Canada	31	7			
10 Zoa Linsey	US	50	11			
11 Yaxeni Oriquen-Garcia	Venezuela	10	2	10	20	2

== Attended ==
- 13th Ms. Olympia attended - Yaxeni Oriquen-Garcia
- 12th Ms. Olympia attended - Iris Kyle
- 11th Ms. Olympia attended - Dayana Cadeau
- 4th Ms. Olympia attended - Cathy LeFrançois
- 3rd Ms. Olympia attended - Heather Foster
- 2nd Ms. Olympia attended - Debi Laszewski and Tina Chandler
- 1st Ms. Olympia attended - Zoa Linsey, Brigita Brezovac, Helen Bouchard, and Sheila Bleck
- Previous year Olympia attendees who did not attend - Heather Armbrust, Betty Viana-Adkins, Rosemary Jennings, Heather Foster, Nicole Ball, Gale Frankie, Kristy Hawkins, Betty Pariso, and Lisa Aukland

== Notable events ==
- This was Iris Kyle's 6th overall and 5th consecutive Olympia win, thus tied her with Cory Everson with the number of overall Olympia wins and surpassed Kim Chizevsky's number of a consecutive Olympia wins.
- Heather Armbrust, who on 8 June 2010, told MuscleSport Radio that she was training hard for the 2010 Ms. Olympia, did not attend the 2010 Ms. Olympia due to a series of personal problems that ultimately lead to her retiring from bodybuilding. Lisa Aukland and Betty Pariso both did not attend the 2010 Ms. Olympia due to retiring from bodybuidling.

== 2010 Ms. Olympia qualified ==
2010 Europa Battle of Champions

Hartford, Connecticut, US, July 24, 2010

1. Brigita Brezovac, (Slovenia)
2. Helen Bouchard, (Canada)
3. Cathy LeFrancois, (Canada)

2010 Pro Bodybuilding Weekly Championships

Tampa, Florida, US, July 17, 2010

1. Brigita Brezovac, (Slovenia)
2. Tina Chandler, (United States)
3. Cathy LeFrancois, (Canada)

2010 New York Pro

New York, New York, US, May 8, 2010

1. Cathy LeFrancois, (Canada)
2. Sheila Bleck, (United States)
3. Heather Foster, (United States)

2010 Ms. International

Columbus, Ohio, US, March 5, 2010

1. Iris Kyle, (United States)
2. Yaxeni Oriquen-Garcia, (Venezuela)
3. Debbie Laszewski, (United States)
4. Lisa Aukland, (United States)
5. Betty Pariso, (United States)
6. Dayana Cadeau, (Canada)

2010 Phoenix Pro

Phoenix, Arizona, US, February 20, 2010

1. Yaxeni Oriquen-Garcia, (Venezuela)
2. Betty Pariso, (United States)
3. Zoa Linsey, (Canada)

2009 Ms. Olympia

Las Vegas, Nevada, US, September 25, 2009

1. Iris Kyle, (United States)
2. Heather Armbrust, (United States)
3. Debbie Laszewski, (United States)
4. Lisa Aukland, (United States)
5. Yaxeni Oriquen-Garcia, (Venezuela)
6. Betty Pariso, (United States)

== See also ==
- 2010 Mr. Olympia
