= 2011 Ms. Olympia =

Women's professional bodybuilding competition

- Promotion: IFBB
- Date: September 16, 2011
- Venue: South Hall in the Las Vegas Convention Center and Orleans Arena at The Orleans Hotel and Casino
- City: Winchester and Paradise, Nevada, United States

Event chronology
2010 Ms. Olympia	2011 Ms. Olympia	2012 Ms. Olympia

The 2011 Ms. Olympia contest was an IFBB professional bodybuilding competition and part of Joe Weider's Olympia Fitness & Performance Weekend 2011 was held on September 16, 2011, at the South Hall in the Las Vegas Convention Center in Winchester, Nevada and in the Orleans Arena at The Orleans Hotel and Casino in Paradise, Nevada. It was the 32nd Ms. Olympia competition held. Other events at the exhibition included the 212 Olympia Showdown, Mr. Olympia, Fitness Olympia, Figure Olympia, and Bikini Olympia contests.

== Prize money ==
- 1st - $28,000
- 2nd - $14,000
- 3rd - $8,000
- 4th - $5,000
- 5th - $3,000
- 6th - $2,000

Total: $60,000

== Rounds ==
- Prejudging Round: Assessed contestants based on their symmetry, muscularity, and conditioning. Judges evaluated the overall physique, including balance, proportion, and muscle definition.
- Finals Round: The posing routine and final posedown. Contestants presented their choreographed routines, showcasing creativity, presentation skills, and overall stage presence. The posedown allowed for direct comparison among the top contestants.

== Results ==
- 1st - Iris Kyle
- 2nd - Yaxeni Oriquen-Garcia
- 3rd - Brigita Brezovac
- 4th - Debi Laszewski
- 5th - Alina Popa
- 6th - Sheila Bleck
- 7th - Kim Perez
- 8th - Nicole Ball
- 9th - Monique Jones
- 10th - Tina Chandler
- 11th - Kim Buck
- 12th - Heather Foster
- 13th - Cathy LeFrançois
- 14th - Helle Trevino
- 15th - Skadi Frei-Seifert
- 16th - Dayana Cadeau
- 17th - Mah Ann Mendoza

Comparison to previous Olympia results:

- Same - Iris Kyle
- Same - Yaxeni Oriquen-Garcia
- -1 - Debi Laszewski
- +1 - Alina Popa
- -2 - Sheila Bleck
- -2 - Tina Chandler
- +6 - Heather Foster
- -6 - Cathy LeFrançois
- -9 - Helle Trevino
- -11 - Dayana Cadeau

=== Scorecard ===
No	NAME	COUNTRY	JUDGING	FINALS	TOTAL	PLACE
1	Ball, Nicole	USA	42	36	78	8
2	Bleck, Sheila	USA	32	36	68	6
3	Brezovac, Brigita	Slovenia	17	15	32	3
4	Buck, Kim	USA	52	51	103	11
5	Cadeau, Dayana	Canada	79	79	158	16
6	Chandler, Tina	USA	52	46	98	10
7	Foster, Heather	USA	50	50	100	12
8	Jones, Monique	USA	42	53	95	12
9	Kyle, Iris	USA	5	5	10	1
10	Laszewski, Debi	USA	18	20	38	4
11	LeFrancois, Cathy	Canada	62	69	131	13
12	Mendoza, Mah Ann	USA	25	15	40	4
13	Nielsen, Helle	Denmark	70	75	145	14
14	Oriquen-Garcia, Yaxeni	Venezuela	11	10	21	2
15	Perez, Kim	USA	37	40	77	7
16	Popa, Alina	Switzerland	25	25	50	5
17	Frei-Seifert, Skada	Germany	73	72	145	15
Sandy Williamson			September 16, 2011			
IFBB PROFESSIONAL LEAGUE			DATE			

== Attended ==
- 14th Ms. Olympia attended - Yaxeni Oriquen-Garcia
- 13th Ms. Olympia attended - Iris Kyle
- 12th Ms. Olympia attended - Dayana Cadeau
- 5th Ms. Olympia attended - Cathy LeFrançois
- 4th Ms. Olympia attended - Heather Foster
- 3rd Ms. Olympia attended - Debi Laszewski and Tina Chandler
- 2nd Ms. Olympia attended - Sheila Bleck and Helle Trevino
- 1st Ms. Olympia attended - Alina Popa, Brigita Brezovac, Nicole Ball, Monique Jones, Kim Buck, Skadi Frei-Seifert, and Mah Ann Mendoza
- Previous year Olympia attendees who did not attend - Helen Bouchard and Zoa Linsey

== Notable events ==
- This was Iris Kyle's 7th overall and 6th consecutive Ms. Olympia win, thus tying Cory Everson and Lenda Murray's record of six consecutive Ms. Olympia wins.
  - * According to Gene Hwang, Iris admitted to coming in a "bit less ripped this year".
- This was Dayana Cadeau's last Olympia she competed in before she retired from bodybuilding.
- According to Steve Wennerstrom, IFBB Women's Historian, Alina Popa came in at 163 lb (74 kg) and Skadi Seifert came in at 160 lb (73 kg).
- Betty Viana-Adkins withdrew due to medical issues.

== 2011 Ms. Olympia Qualified ==
From the 2010 Ms. Olympia

Las Vegas, Nevada, USA, September 24

1. Iris Kyle, (United States)

2. Yaxeni Oriquen-Garcia, (Venezuela)

3. Debi Laszewski, (United States)

4. Sheila Bleck, (United States)

5. Dayana Cadeau, (Canada)

6. Heather Foster, (United States)

From the 2011 Ms. International

Columbus, Ohio USA, March 4

1. Iris Kyle, (United States)

2. Yaxeni Oriquen-Garcia, (Venezuela)

3. Alina Popa, (Switzerland)

4. Debi Laszewski, (United States)

5. Betty Viana-Adkins, (Venezuela)

6. Cathy LeFrancois, (Canada)

From the 2011 FIBO Power Pro Championships

Essen, Germany, April 16

1. Helle Trevino, (United States)

2. Skada Frei-Seifert, (Germany)

3. Cathy LeFrancois, (Canada)

From the 2011 Toronto Pro Super Show

Toronto, Canada, June 17

1. Brigita Brezovac, (Slovenia)

2. Nicole Ball, (Canada)

3. Mah Ann Mendoza, (Philippines)

From the 2011 Pro Bodybuilding Weekly Championships

Tampa, Florida, USA, June 25

1. Cathy LeFrancois, (Canada)

2. Tina Chandler, (United States)

3. Brigita Brezovac, (Slovenia)

From the 2011 Europa Battle of Champions

Hartford, Connecticut, USA, July 30

1. Kim Buck, (United States)

2. Monique Jones, (United States)

3. Kim Perez, (United States)

== See also ==
- 2011 Mr. Olympia
