= 2009 Ms. Olympia =

Women's professional bodybuilding competition

- Promotion: IFBB
- Date: September 25, 2009
- Venue: South Hall in the Las Vegas Convention Center and Orleans Arena at The Orleans Hotel and Casino
- City: Winchester and Paradise, Nevada, United States

Event chronology
2008 Ms. Olympia	2009 Ms. Olympia	2010 Ms. Olympia

The 2009 Ms. Olympia contest is an IFBB professional bodybuilding competition and part of Joe Weider's Olympia Fitness & Performance Weekend 2009 was held on September 25, 2009, at the South Hall in the Las Vegas Convention Center in Winchester, Nevada and in the Orleans Arena at The Orleans Hotel and Casino in Paradise, Nevada. It was the 30th Ms. Olympia competition held. Other events at the exhibition include the 212 Olympia Showdown, Mr. Olympia, Fitness Olympia, and Figure Olympia contests.

== Prize money ==
- 1st - $28,000
- 2nd - $15,000
- 3rd - $8,000
- 4th - $5,000
- 5th - $3,000
- 6th - $2,000

Total: $61,000

== Rounds ==
- Round 1 + Round 2 (Symmetry and Muscularity/Conditioning Rounds): Judges evaluated the competitors' balance, proportion, muscle size, and conditioning.
- Round 3 (Compulsory Poses Round): Contestants performed mandatory poses to showcase their physiques uniformly.
- Round 4 (Posedown Round): Contestants presented a choreographed routine to music, highlighting creativity and presentation skills.

== Results ==
- 1st - Iris Kyle
- 2nd - Heather Armbrust
- 3rd - Debi Laszewski
- 4th - Lisa Aukland
- 5th - Yaxeni Oriquen-Garcia
- 6th - Betty Pariso
- 7th - Kristy Hawkins
- 8th - Dayana Cadeau
- 9th - Betty Viana-Adkins
- 10th - Tina Chandler
- 11th - Rosemary Jennings
- 12th - Nicole Ball
- 13th - Gale Frankie

Comparison to previous Olympia results:

- Same - Iris Kyle
- -12 - Heather Armbrust
- Same - Lisa Aukland
- -2 - Yaxeni Oriquen-Garcia
- -1 - Betty Pariso
- -6 - Dayana Cadeau
- -7 - Betty Viana-Adkins
- -4 - Rosemary Jennings
- -1 - Nicole Ball

=== Scorecard ===
			Judging	Finals			
No	NAME	COUNTRY	RD1+RD2 ^{1}	RD3 ^{2}	RD4 ^{3}	TOTAL	PLACE
1	Armbrust, Heather	USA	10	10	10	30	2
2	Aukland, Lisa	USA	18	17	16	51	4
3	Ball, Nicole	Canada	58	48		106	12
4	Cadeau, Dayana	Canada	40	32		72	8
5	Chandler, Tina	USA	54	50		104	10
6	Frankie, Gale	USA	62	59		121	13
7	Hawkins, Kristy	USA	35	35		70	7
8	Jennings, Rosemary	USA	53	53		106	11
9	Kyle, Iris	USA	5	5	5	15	1
10	Laszewski, Debi	USA	18	15	15	48	3
11	Oriquen-Garcia, Yaxeni	Venezuela	25	24	23	72	5
12	Pariso, Betty	USA	30	29	27	86	6
13	Viana-Adkins, Betty	Venezuela	45	41		86	9
Sandy Williamson IFBB PROFESSIONAL LEAGUE			September 25, 2009 DATE				

^{1} Individual Mandatory Poses and Callouts
^{2} 3-min Posing Routine
^{3} Mandatory Poses and Posedown

== Attended ==
- 12th Ms. Olympia attended - Yaxeni Oriquen-Garcia
- 11th Ms. Olympia attended - Iris Kyle
- 10th Ms. Olympia attended - Dayana Cadeau
- 8th Ms. Olympia attended - Betty Pariso
- 5th Ms. Olympia attended - Lisa Aukland
- 4th Ms. Olympia attended - Betty Viana-Adkins and Rosemary Jennings
- 3rd Ms. Olympia attended - Heather Armbrust and Nicole Ball
- 1st Ms. Olympia attended - Debi Laszewski, Kristy Hawkins, Tina Chandler, and Gale Frankie
- Previous year Olympia attendees who did not attend - Klaudia Larson, Sherry Smith, Debbie Bramwell, Brenda Raganot, Jennifer Sedia, Jeannie Paparone, Mah-Ann Mendoza, and Cathy LeFrançois

== Notable events ==
- This was Iris Kyle's 5th overall and 4th consecutive Olympia win, thus tied her with Kim Chizevsky-Nicholls with the number of consecutive Olympia wins and surpassed Kim Chizevsky-Nicholls's overall Olympia wins.
- This was the heaviest Iris Kyle competed at in Ms. Olympia at 165 lb (75 kg).
- Heather Armbrust placed 2nd place this Olympia, the best placing she has ever had at the Olympia. This is also Heather Armbrust's last Olympia before her retirement from bodybuilding in 2011.
- This is Lisa Aukland's last Olympia she attended before her retirement from bodybuilding in 2010.
- This is Betty Pariso's, the oldest IFBB pro female bodybuilder active, last Olympia she attended before her retirement from bodybuilding in 2010.
- This is Betty Viana-Adkins's and Rosemary Jennings's last Olympia they have attended.
- The song played during the posedown was Fire Burning by Sean Kingston.

== 2009 Ms. Olympia Qualified ==
From the 2009 Atlantic City Pro:

Atlantic City, New Jersey, USA, September 12, 2009

1. Lisa Aukland, (United States)

2. Kristy Hawkins, (United States)

3. Nicole Ball, (Canada)

From the 2009 Tampa Pro Bodybuilding Weekly Championships:

Tampa, Florida, USA, August 8, 2009

1. Betty Pariso, (United States)

2. Gale Frankie, (United States)

3. Tina Chandler, (United States)

From the 2009 New York Pro:

New York, New York, USA, May 16, 2009

1. Cathy LeFrancois, (Canada)

2. Betty Pariso, (United States)

3. Rosemary Jennings, (United States)

From the 2009 Ms. International:

Columbus, Ohio, USA, March 6, 2009

1. Iris Kyle, (United States)

2. Debi Laszewski, (United States)

3. Yaxeni Oriquen-Garcia, (Venezuela)

4. Heather Armbrust, (United States)

5. Dayana Cadeau, (Canada)

6. Betty Viana-Adkins, (Venezuela)

7. Isabelle Turell, (United States) ^{*}

^{*}Qualifies pursuant to IFBB Pro Rule 4.5.5

From the 2008 Ms. Olympia:

Las Vegas, Nevada, USA, September 26, 2008

1. Iris Kyle, (United States)

2. Betty Viana-Adkins, (Venezuela)

3. Yaxeni Oriquen-Garcia, (Venezuela)

4. Lisa Aukland, (United States)

5. Dayana Cadeau, (Canada)

6. Cathy LeFrancois, (Canada)

== See also ==
- 2009 Mr. Olympia
