= Iris Kyle =

American bodybuilder (born 1974)

- ♀ Professional bodybuilder
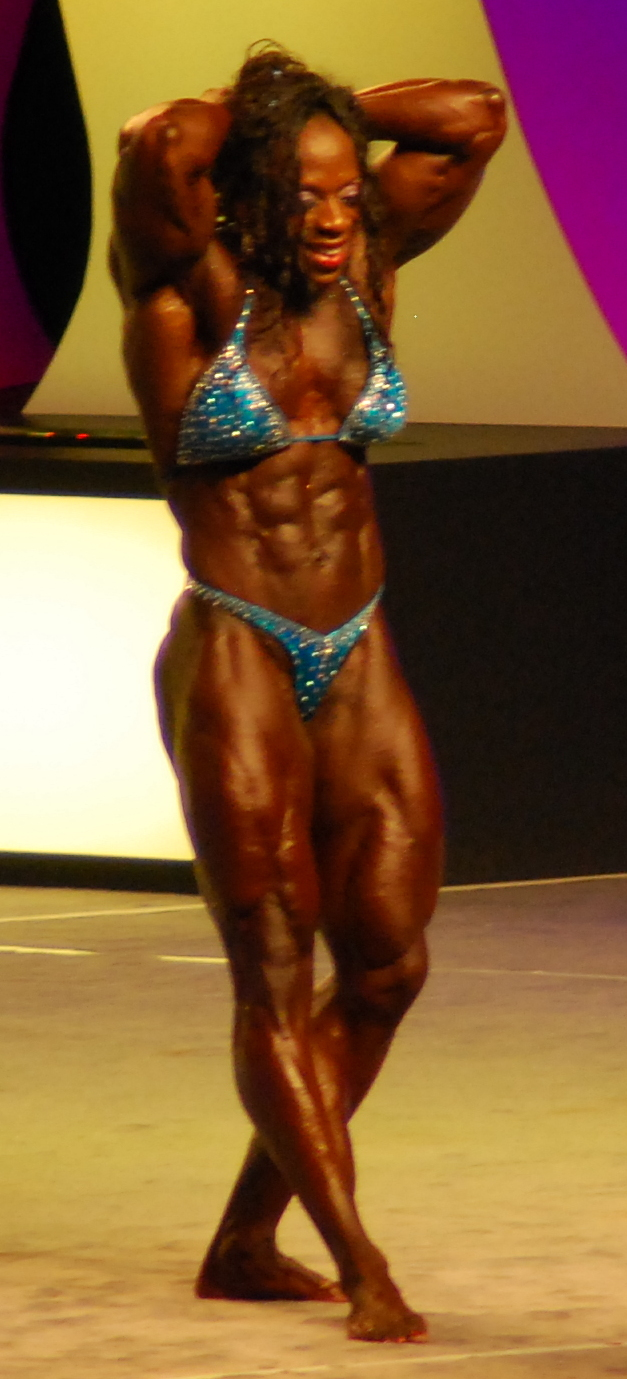
- Iris Kyle doing an abdominals and thighs pose during the finals individual mandatory posing during the 2008 Ms. Olympia.

Personal info
- Née: Carter
- Full name: Iris Floyd Kyle
- Born: Mildred Carter; August 22, 1974 (age 52); Benton Harbor, Michigan, U.S.

Best statistics
- Bench press: 375 lb (170 kg)
- Biceps: 17 inches (43 cm)
- Calves: 18 inches (46 cm)
- Chest: 36 inches (91 cm)
- Contest weight: 130–170 lb (59–77 kg)
- Height: 5 ft 7 in (1.70 m)
- Hips: 36 inches (91 cm)
- Off-season weight: 175–180 lb (79–82 kg)
- Quads: 29 inches (74 cm)
- Thighs: 29 inches (74 cm)
- Waist: 24 inches (61 cm)

Professional (Pro) career
- Pro-debut: International Federation of Bodybuilders Pro Division (IFBB) Ms. International; 1999
- Best wins: IFBB Ms. Olympia; 2004, 2006–2014
- Predecessors: Lenda Murray; Yaxeni Oriquen-Garcia
- Successors: Yaxeni Oriquen-Garcia; Andrea Shaw
- Pro years: 1999–2020
- Coaches: Patrick Lynn (1994–2004); Victor Conte Jr. (consultant; 2006–2020); Patrick Tuor (2020)
- Protégés: Hidetada Yamagishi (2016–present); Alcione Santos Barreto (2024)
Medal record
Ms. Olympia
1st	2001 Ms. Olympia	Heavyweight (HW)
2nd	2002 Ms. Olympia	HW
2nd	2003 Ms. Olympia	HW
1st	2004 Ms. Olympia	Overall & HW
2nd	2005 Ms. Olympia	Open
1st	2006 Ms. Olympia	Open
1st	2007 Ms. Olympia	Open
1st	2008 Ms. Olympia	Open
1st	2009 Ms. Olympia	Open
1st	2010 Ms. Olympia	Open
1st	2011 Ms. Olympia	Open
1st	2012 Ms. Olympia	Open
1st	2013 Ms. Olympia	Open
1st	2014 Ms. Olympia	Open
Ms. International
3rd	2000 Ms. International	HW
Disqualified	2000 Ms. International	HW
2nd	2001 Ms. International	HW
2nd	2002 Ms. International	HW
1st	2004 Ms. International	Overall & HW
1st	2006 Ms. International	Open
1st	2007 Ms. International	Open
1st	2009 Ms. International	Open
1st	2010 Ms. International	Open
1st	2011 Ms. International	Open
1st	2013 Ms. International	Open
Other IFBB contests
2nd	1999 World Pro Championships	Open
2nd	2002 General Nutrition Centers Show of Strength	HW

Iris Floyd Kyle (born Mildred Carter; August 22, 1974) is an American professional female bodybuilder. She is currently the most successful female professional bodybuilder ever. She has a total of twenty professional bodybuilding titles, with ten overall and two heavyweight Ms. Olympia titles (more Mr. and Ms. Olympia titles than anyone else) and seven overall and one heavyweight Ms. International titles (more Arnold Classic and Ms. International titles than anyone).

== Early life ==
Iris Floyd Kyle was born on August 22, 1974 in Benton Harbor, Michigan, the fifth of six children in an African American family. Her early athletic endeavors included running cross country, basketball (point guard), softball (shortstop) and volleyball. She was an All-American in basketball, and received a number of athletic scholarship offers. Kyle attended Benton Harbor High School and continued her education at Alcorn State University in Lorman, Mississippi, on a basketball scholarship, majoring in business administration and minoring in accounting.

== Bodybuilding career ==
=== Amateur ===
Iris claims the reason she got into bodybuilding was when she and her family moved to Orange County, California, and being surrounded by fit, healthy-looking people, she thought she could obtain a similar highly trained, sculpted physique. She walked into Bally Total Fitness and took out a membership. Eventually she got a job teaching aerobics and later a sales manager at Bally Total Fitness, which is when she started lifting weights. "I distinctly remember being a bit overwhelmed with the facilities and the seemingly endless variety of training equipment, but I knew at that exact moment ... without feeling even the slightest doubt ... that I could develop the kind of physique I wanted." She became a voracious reader of the magazines FLEX, Muscle and Fitness, and Iron Man.

Iris recalls, "I remember the first time I saw a photograph of Lenda Murray in a magazine. I was in complete awe. I cut out that picture and placed it on my refrigerator and, from that point on, my goal was to develop a physique like hers." One day, a local promoter named Butch Dennis was in her gym and, after sizing her up, suggested she enter a competition he was hosting in 8 weeks, the Long Beach Muscle Classic. Her model for her physique was a combination of Lenda Murray and Bev Francis. She won the contest, the 1994 Long Beach Muscle Classic. From 1994 until turning pro, she was advised and coached by professional bodybuilder Patrick Lynn. After coming in 2nd in the middleweight category at the 1994 NPC Ironmaiden Championships, she began using performance-enhancing substances.

Steve Wennerstrom, IFBB women's historian, wrote a photoreport in the Women's Physique World November / December 1996 issue called "Keep An Eye on Iris Kyle!". In the report he focused on her 1996 NPC California overall and heavyweight title win. He also wrote that "The 5-7, 144-pound Kyle showed a dazzling level of muscle definition to go with sound structural balance and a stage savvy that puts her physical qualities at the national level right now."

In 1996, NPC USA Championships, Iris came in second to Heather Foster in the heavyweight category. In July 1998, at the NPC USA Championships in Artemus W. Ham Concert Hall, University of Nevada, Las Vegas, Las Vegas, Nevada, she edged out Foster by one point in the final tally after having shared first place judging votes with her to go on and win the heavyweight, overall, and IFBB pro card at the age of 23 years old and 150 lb (68 kg).

=== Professional ===
==== 1999–2001 ====
Iris began to distance herself from friends and family and to become very isolated, stating that she found this the best way to make gains. At her pro debut at the 1999 Ms. International, she placed 15th. As she passed Steve Wennerstrom backstage, she whispered to him, “THAT, will never happen again." She has had a series of high placings as a professional. With the exception of the 1999 and 2008 Ms. Internationals, Iris has always placed in the top six in every IFBB pro bodybuilding competition in which she competed. Steve Wennerstrom, IFBB women's historian, wrote in the November 1999 edition of Flex that her 2nd place at the 1999 IFBB Pro World was "a welcome one for the structurally impressive 5'7", 155-pound Kyle." He also wrote that "Combining some of the qualities of Yolanda Hughes and Lenda Murray, with calves better than both, the 27-year-old health-club manager needs only to add some styling to her general appearance to put a shiny finish on her physical armament."

At the 2000 Ms International, Tazzie Colomb and Iris were both disqualified for diuretic use. She won her first professional contest at the 2001 Ms. Olympia, winning the heavyweight title, but losing the overall Olympia title to Juliette Bergmann. Looking back, Iris maintains, "I sincerely believe that I was the rightful 2001 Overall Ms. Olympia. I'm not saying Juliette didn't display a nice overall package; I'm just saying I believe my physique was better."

==== 2002–2005 ====
In 2002, Lenda Murray returned from retirement to reclaim her Ms. Olympia title in 2002 and 2003, with Iris coming in second both times behind her idol. In 2004, Iris won both the overall and heavyweight titles of Ms. International and went on to beat Murray and win the overall and heavyweight title of the 2004 Ms. Olympia. In 2005, Iris skipped the Ms. International, and focused defending her Olympia title. However, in 2005, the IFBB changed the rules and abolished the weight class system for Ms. Olympia, along with the new '20 percent rule' requesting "that female athletes in Bodybuilding, Fitness and Figure decrease the amount of muscularity by a factor of 20%". This allowed Yaxeni Oriquen-Garcia to win both the 2005 Ms. International and dethrone Iris at the 2005 Ms. Olympia.

==== 2006–2014 ====
In 2006, Iris rebounded by regaining both her Ms. International and Ms. Olympia titles. After the 2006 Ms. Olympia, she revealed that she consults with Victor Conte. In 2007, she again won both Ms. International and Ms. Olympia. There was controversy at the 2008 Ms. International due to placing Iris Kyle in a tie with Betty Viana-Adkins for 7th place. This was Iris' worst placing since her professional debut at the 1999 Ms. International where she placed 15th place. This put Iris outside the top 6 posedown and any prize money. According to the scorecard, in rounds 1 & 2 she obtained 44 points, which would place her above Betty Pariso for 4th place, but by round 3 she garnered 65 points for a combined total of 109 points. Only she and Dayana Cadeau increased their points in round 3 compared to rounds 1 & 2. After the 2008 Ms. International, in an interview on an episode of the Pro Bodybuilding Weekly Radio talk program, when asked about why there was bumps on Iris' shoulders and glutes, which she later admitted where "noticeable site injections", she said that "when you in the sport and you decide to take it to the league level you know those things take place". She also stated that the bumps won't even have been an issue if she had been a male and thought she should have been placed 1st. Later in that same episode, according to head IFBB judge, Sandy Ranalli, she stated that Iris was placed 7th due to "distortions" in her shoulders and glutes that the other competitors didn't have. However, she had previously had bumps on her glutes in previous Ms. International's and Ms. Olympia's and either outright won them or placed higher than 7th place.

Iris rebounded at the 2008 Ms. Olympia by winning the show. Iris went on to win both 2009 Ms. International and 2009 Ms. Olympia titles in the same year. At the 2010 Ms. International, Iris won her fifth Ms. International, surpassing Yaxeni Oriquen-Garcia's four Ms. International wins, becoming the most successful Ms. International champion ever. She has gone on to win the 2010 Ms. Olympia and 2011 Ms. International and 2011 Ms. Olympia. In 2012, she could not attend the 2012 Ms. International due to a leg injury. Iris went on to win the 2012 Ms. Olympia and regained her Ms. International title in 2013. In 2013, she won her ninth overall Ms. Olympia, making her the most successful female professional bodybuilder of all time. In 2014, she won her tenth overall Ms. Olympia title, breaking her own previous record of nine overall Ms. Olympia titles. After winning her tenth overall Ms. Olympia title, Iris stated that she was retiring from bodybuilding.

==== 2015–2022 ====
On September 25, 2015, in an interview with Dave Palumbo, Iris announced she will be coming out of retirement to compete at the 2016 Wings of Strength Rising Phoenix World Championships. Although she stated she wanted to compete at the 2016 Wings of Strength Rising Phoenix World Championships, Tim Gardner contacted her boyfriend, Hidetada Yamagishi and told him that she needed to qualify by either winning the 2016 Puerto Rico Pro, 2016 Toronto Pro Supershow, the 2016 Omaha Pro, the 2016 Chicago Pro, the 2016 Lenda Murray Pro AM, or the 2016 PBW Tampa Pro, or be one the top 7 IFBB female bodybuilder's to accumulative points implementing the IFBB Tier 4 point system. A follow-up call from her to Jim Manion’s office resulted in her being told that she does not have to qualify, as per International Federation of Bodybuilding and Fitness Professional League (IFBB Pro League) rules, which state that any former Olympia is automatically qualified to compete in any IFBB Pro League contest.

Both Tim Gardner and Jack Wood keep contacting Iris that she still needed to be approved by them and that meant to compete in another WOS show in order to qualify. She was later granted a special invite to the 2016 Rising Phoenix World Championships. Tim later contacted her on two separate occasions informing her that she can win the show based on her shape, not to worry about coming in with shredded glutes and she can come in soft. She also said that she was offered to do some work with them that she doesn't "agree with", but declined the offer. For the first time in her professional career, she got a coach, Patrick Tour, to prepare her for the 2016 Rising Phoenix World Championships. While Tim did later allow her a special invite to the 2016 Wings of Strength Rising Phoenix World Championships, she declined to compete, instead focusing on training her boyfriend, Hidetada Yamagishi, for the 2017 Arnold Classic Men's Physique and focusing on their business venture.

In September 2016, in an interview with Nevada Public Radio, Iris agreed with Jeff O'Connell's, editor of bodybuilding.com, assessment that performance-enhancing substances are quite prevalent in bodybuilding, especially at the Olympia level. However, she stressed that while IFBB professional female bodybuilders use performance-enhancing substances, it also requires hard work and genetics. When asked if she would rather compete without taking performance-enhancing substances if everyone else did, she responded that "I never said I took steroids, you said that." She also stated that IFBB professional female bodybuilding is infested with performance-enhancing substances. In the Winter 2016 edition of Muscle Sport Magazine, Kyle, in an interview with Joe Pietaro, criticized the IFBB for its treatment of female bodybuilders and called for the creation of a union and ambassador for female bodybuilders.

At the 2019 Hidetada Yamagishi, Iris Kyle Japan Classic, Iris appeared as a guest poser, the most recent guest posing she did. In July 2020, Iris announced she was compete at the 2020 Ms. Olympia. IFBB professional bodybuilder Patrick Tuor has been coaching her for the upcoming 2020 Ms. Olympia. She co-promotes two shows in Japan with her ex-boyfriend, Hidetada Yamagishi. She ranks as the best female bodybuilder in the IFBB Pro Women's Bodybuilding Ranking List. On July 29, 2022, in an interview with Hellchang on Physical World, she announced for the second time her retirement from professional bodybuilding.

==== Legacy ====
Iris is currently the most successful, female or male, professional bodybuilder ever. She has a total of twenty professional bodybuilding titles, with ten overall and two heavyweight Ms. Olympia titles (more than any Mr. and Ms. Olympia titles than anyone) and seven overall and one heavyweight Ms. International titles (more than any Arnold Classic and Ms. International titles than anyone). In the September 2018 United Kingdom edition of Flex, Darren Nicholhurst, an editor for Flex, called for her to be inducted into the IFBB Professional League Hall of Fame, which has not had any new inductees since 2011. She also said she would like a different method of judging bodybuilding contests, with judges removed and giving the audience the ability to decide instead.

She had previously been training partners with John Sherman and, since 2012, is currently training partners with Hidetada Yamagishi. She and Hidetada co-promote the NPC Worldwide Hidetada Yamagishi & Iris Kyle Japan Classic and another amateur bodybuilding show in Japan. In 2024, she has been coaching Alcione Barreto, IFBB Pro League professional bodybuilder, at her gym, the Powerhouse Gym Iris Kyle, Hidetada Yamagishi Las Vegas, Nevada, in preparation for the 2024 Ms. Olympia.

=== Competition history ===
- 1994 National Physique Committee (NPC) Long Beach Muscle Classic – 1st
- 1994 NPC Ironmaiden Championships – 2nd (Middleweight)
- 1996 NPC Orange County Muscle Classic – 1st (Heavyweight (HW) & Overall (OA))
- 1996 NPC California – 1st (HW & OA)
- 1996 NPC USA Championships – 2nd
- 1997 NPC USA Championships – 3rd (HW)
- 1997 NPC Nationals – 4th (HW)
- 1998 NPC USA Championships – 1st (HW & OA)
- 1999 International Federation of BodyBuilding and Fitness (IFBB) Ms. International – 15th
- 1999 IFBB Pro World Championship – 2nd
- 1999 IFBB Ms. Olympia – 4th
- 2000 IFBB Ms. International – 3rd (HW; later disqualified)
- 2000 IFBB Ms. Olympia – 5th (HW)
- 2001 IFBB Ms. International – 2nd (HW)
- 2001 IFBB Ms. Olympia – 1st (HW)
- 2002 IFBB Ms. International – 2nd (HW)
- 2002 IFBB Ms. Olympia – 2nd (HW)
- 2002 IFBB General Nutrition Centers Show of Strength – 2nd (HW)
- 2003 IFBB Ms. Olympia – 2nd (HW)
- 2004 IFBB Ms. International – 1st (HW & OA)
- 2004 IFBB Ms. Olympia – 1st (HW & OA)
- 2005 IFBB Professional League (IFBB) Ms. Olympia – 2nd
- 2006 IFBB Ms. International – 1st
- 2006 IFBB Ms. Olympia – 1st
- 2007 IFBB Ms. International – 1st
- 2007 IFBB Ms. Olympia – 1st
- 2008 IFBB Ms. International – 7th
- 2008 IFBB Ms. Olympia – 1st
- 2009 IFBB Ms. International – 1st
- 2009 IFBB Ms. Olympia – 1st
- 2010 IFBB Ms. International – 1st
- 2010 IFBB Ms. Olympia – 1st
- 2011 IFBB Ms. International – 1st
- 2011 IFBB Ms. Olympia – 1st
- 2012 IFBB Ms. Olympia – 1st
- 2013 IFBB Ms. International – 1st
- 2013 IFBB Ms. Olympia – 1st
- 2014 IFBB Ms. Olympia – 1st

=== Best statistics ===
- Bench press - 375 lb (170 kg)
- Biceps - 17 inches (43 cm)
- Calves - 18 inches (46 cm)
- Chest - 36 inches (91 cm)
- Height - 5 ft 7 in (170 cm)
- Hips - 36 inches (91 cm)
- On season weight - 130–170 lb (59–77 kg)
- Quads - 29 inches (74 cm)
- Thighs - 29 inches (74 cm)
- Waist - 24 inches (61 cm)

== Other interests ==
=== Media appearances ===
On September 9, 2008, Iris made an appearance on episode 9, "The Special Episode", of season 1 of Wipeout. During the episode, she suffered an accident on a water slide in which several of her ribs were broken. She was also constantly referred to as "he" by one of the show's hosts. On September 16, 2008, her appearance was featured as one of the top 25 moments of the show. In an interview with RX Muscle Girls Inc. (with hosts Colette Nelson and Krissy Chin), she revealed that she was invited back for another appearance on Wipeout due to the popularity of her episode but declined, citing the possibility of another injury and the lack of respect she received from the hosts.

Iris appeared in the trailer for the unfinished film A:B - We are Sisyphos and was supposed to play the character "Dina" in the film. She appeared in the 2013 bodybuilding documentary ASF25 – A Documentary. She and her ex-boyfriend, Hidetada Yamagishi, appeared as themselves in the 2017 bodybuilding documentary film Generation Iron 2. She also appeared in the 2017 music video by Katy Perry titled Katy Perry Feat. Nicki Minaj: Swish Swish.

Footage of her was used in the following television episodes: Bodybuilders (On the Inside), Gender Benders (Taboo), and Episode 160 (Real Sports with Bryant Gumbel), along with footage of her appearing in the documentaries Hooked: Muscle Women and Twisted Sisters.

=== Business ===
Since July 1998, Iris has been an advanced personal trainer who runs her own online training and nutritional business, Healthier by Choice. Since 2007, she has been sponsored by Scientific Nutrition for Advanced Conditioning. Since September 2011, she has been a promoter of the company Visalus. Since 2013, she has been the co-owner of Bodi Cafe, a premier supplement, nutritional company, and smoothie cafe in the City Athletic Club in Las Vegas, Nevada. Since 2021, she has been the co-owner of Powerhouse Gym Iris Kyle, Hidetada Yamagishi Las Vegas, Nevada. She is also sponsored by PNP Perfect Nutrition and Urban Ice Botanicals and brand ambassador of Gaspari Nutrition. Since October 7, 2022, her net worth is estimated to be $9 million, making her the wealthiest female bodybuilder on earth.

=== Real estate ===
Iris is a real estate agent with ERA Realty.

== Personal life ==
Iris previously lived in Katy, Texas. She has previously been a resident of Cypress, Texas; Glen Flora, Texas; Fullerton, California; Huntington Beach, California (where she is the co-owner of the "No Mercy" Gym); Henderson, Nevada; Houston, Texas; Las Vegas, Nevada; Tustin, California, and Westminster, California. She is a Baptist and routinely thanks God after winning competitions. She always starts her day off with a prayer and a reading from the Bible. Sunday is her rest day and she attends church at least every other Sunday.

Iris' current boyfriend is Marc Goldstein who is a finance executive. She had previously been in a 7-year relationship with her training and business partner Hidetada Yamagishi, along with previously dating bodybuilder John J. Sherman. Despite having described her political views as liberal, she voted for fellow bodybuilding icon Arnold Schwarzenegger, a Republican, during his bid for Governor of California. She is fluent in German and Spanish.

== See also ==
- Female bodybuilding
- List of female professional bodybuilders

Ms. Olympia
Preceded by Lenda Murray	Overall champion 2004	Succeeded by Yaxeni Oriquen-Garcia as Champion
Preceded by: Yaxeni Oriquen-Garcia	Second (2006)	Succeeded by: Herself
Preceded by: Herself	Third (2007)	Succeeded by: Herself
Preceded by: Herself	Fourth (2008)	Succeeded by: Herself
Preceded by: Herself	Fifth (2009)	Succeeded by: Herself
Preceded by: Herself	Sixth (2010)	Succeeded by: Herself
Preceded by: Herself	Seventh (2011)	Succeeded by: Herself
Preceded by: Herself	Eighth (2012)	Succeeded by: Herself
Preceded by: Herself	Ninth (2013)	Succeeded by: Herself
Preceded by: Herself	Tenth (2014)	Succeeded by: Andrea Shaw

Ms. International
Preceded by: Yaxeni Oriquen-Garcia	First (2004)	Succeeded by: Yaxeni Oriquen-Garcia
Preceded by: Yaxeni Oriquen-Garcia	Second (2006)	Succeeded by: Herself
Preceded by: Herself	Third (2007)	Succeeded by: Yaxeni Oriquen-Garcia
Preceded by: Yaxeni Oriquen-Garcia	Fourth (2009)	Succeeded by: Herself
Preceded by: Herself	Fifth (2010)	Succeeded by: Herself
Preceded by: Herself	Sixth (2011)	Succeeded by: Yaxeni Oriquen-Garcia
Preceded by: Yaxeni Oriquen-Garcia	Seventh (2013)	Succeeded by: None
