= Krissy Chin =

American figure competitor

- Professional bodybuilder
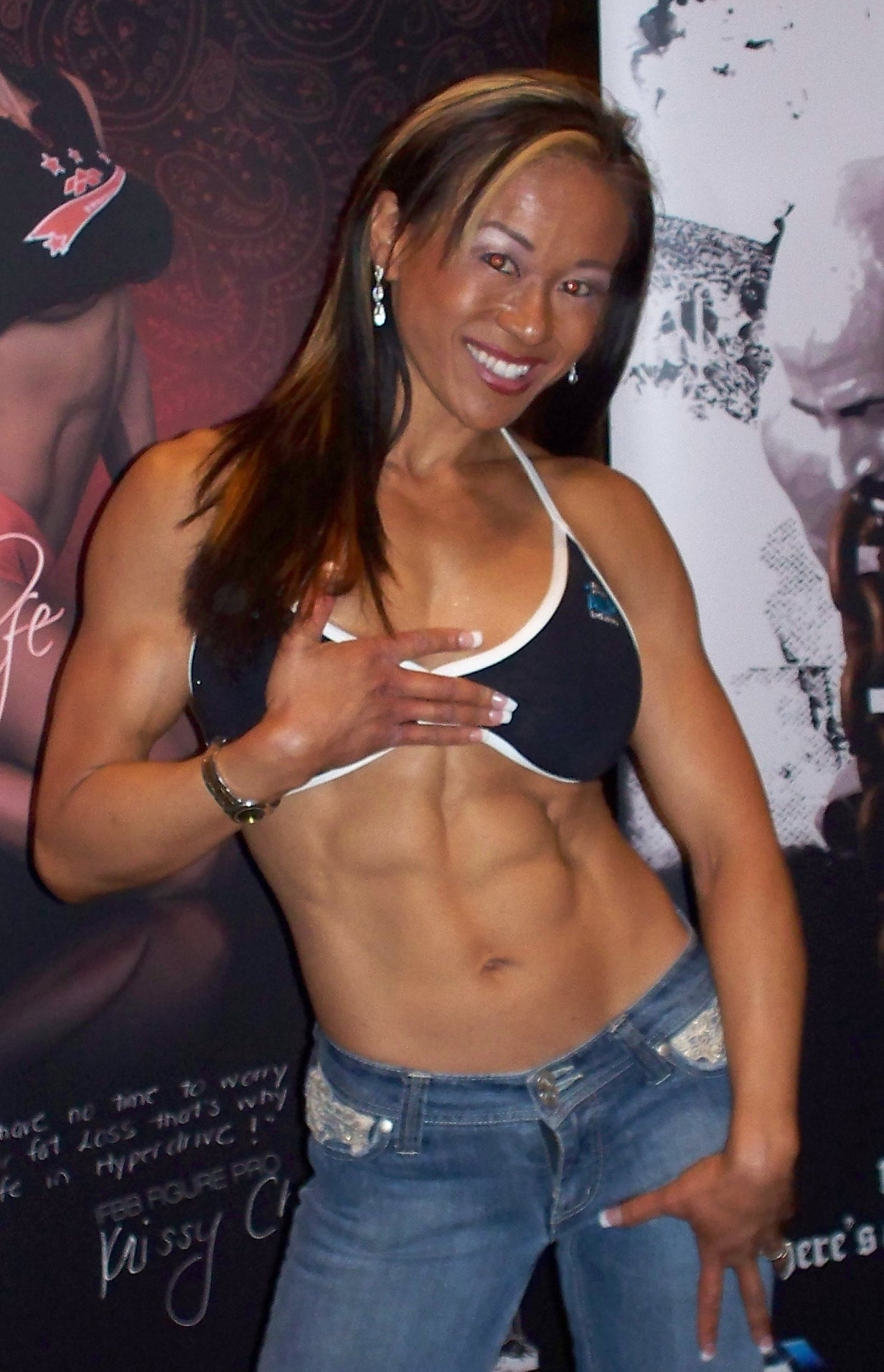
- Krissy Chin in 2008

Personal info
- Born: January 24, 1980 (age 45); Temecula, California, United States

Best statistics
- Height: 5 ft 4 in (1.63 m)
- Weight: 126 to 132 lb (57 to 60 kg)

Krissy Chin (born January 24, 1980) is a professional figure competitor from the United States. She qualified for Ms. Olympia in 2009–2012 and finished in 16th position in 2009–2011. She won the NPC Team Universe in 2007 and Northern California Pro Bikini in 2014, about 18 months after becoming a mother. She is sponsored by Gaspari Nutrition, a bodybuilding supplements company based in the United Kingdom.

Chin's lineage comes from mainland China, though her mother was born in New York and her father in Hong Kong. They both died of cancer in the 1990s. Chin graduated in 2000 from Touro College in New York with a master's degree in physical therapy. She started competing in fitness and bodybuilding in 2003 as an amateur, and became professional in 2007. Chin is married to Troy Johnson, who is also a bodybuilding fan. On November 26, 2012, she gave birth to a girl named London Johnson, and for this reason was away from competitions in 2013. She finished second at the 2012 IFBB California Governors Cup not knowing that she was 6 weeks pregnant – she was taking birth control pills and did not plan to become a mother yet. That year she qualified for her fourth consecutive Ms. Olympia, but had to withdraw.

== Competition history ==
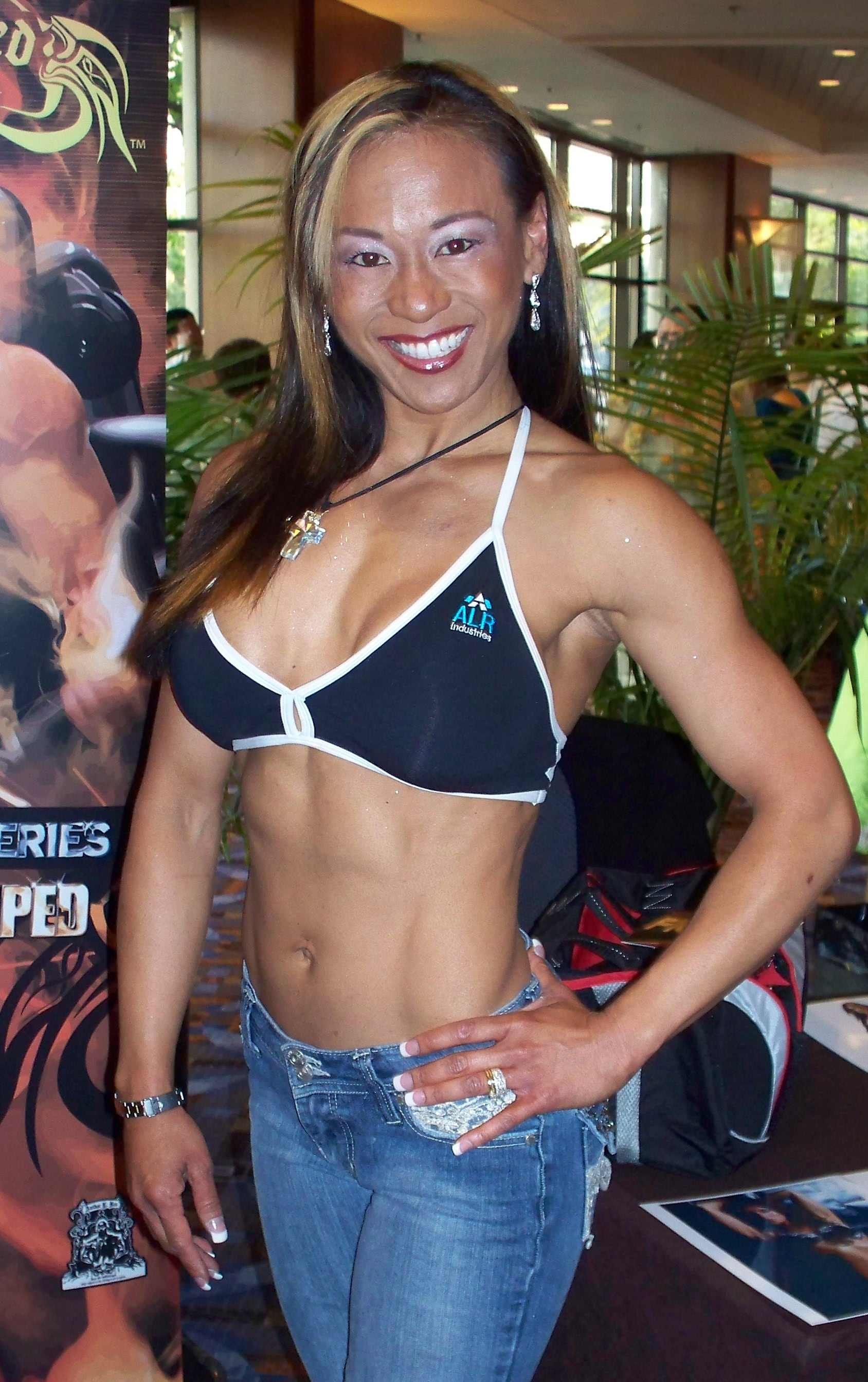
Krissy Chin in 2008

- 2015 IFBB Northern California, Bikini Masters Professional – 1st
- 2014 IFBB Sacramento, Bikini Masters Professional – 3rd
- 2014 IFBB Europa Phoenix – 14th
- 2014 IFBB Korea Pro – 6th
- 2014 IFBB Northern California Pro Bikini – 1st
- 2014 IFBB Dennis James Pro Bikini – 6th
- 2012 IFBB California Governors Cup – 2nd
- 2012 IFBB Arnold Classic – 10th
- 2011 IFBB Border States Pro Figure – 2nd
- 2011 IFBB Houston Pro – 4th
- 2011 IFBB Olympia – 16th, Figure, Professional
- 2011 IFBB Tournament of Champions Pro Figure – 3rd
- 2011 IFBB California Pro Figure – 2nd
- 2011 IFBB Optimum Classic Pro Figure & Bikini – 2nd
- 2010 IFBB Border States Pro Figure – 11th
- 2010 IFBB Houston Pro Figure & Bikini – 8th
- 2010 IFBB Olympia – 16th, Figure, Professional
- 2010 IFBB Arnold Classic, Ms. International, Fitness International & Figure International – 15th
- 2009 IFBB Border States Pro Figure – 3rd
- 2009 IFBB Olympia – 16th, Figure, Professional
- 2009 IFBB Houston Pro Figure – 4th
- 2009 IFBB Europa Super Show & Supplement Expo – 2nd
- 2009 IFBB Jacksonville Pro – 4th
- 2009 IFBB California State Pro Figure Championships – 9th
- 2008 IFBB Atlantic City Pro – 6th
- 2008 IFBB New York Pro Figure – 14th
- 2008 IFBB Jacksonville Pro-Figure / Dexter Jackson Classic – 4th
- 2008 IFBB Houston Pro Bodybuilding, Fitness & Figure Contest – 7th
- 2007 IFBB Europa Super Show – 16th
- 2007 IFBB Houston Pro Figure Contest – 7th
- 2007 NPC Team Universe Bodybuilding, Fitness And Figure Championships – 1st
- 2007 NPC Junior Nationals Bodybuilding, Fitness And Figure Contest – 2nd
- 2007 NPC Gaspari Nutrition Jr. USA Bodybuilding, Fitness and Figure Championships – 2nd
