= Patrick Lynn =

American professional bodybuilder (born 1965)

Patrick Calvin Lynn
- Professional bodybuilder

Personal info
- Born: April 18, 1965 (age 60)

Best statistics

Professional (Pro) career
- Pro-debut: IFBB Night of Champions; 1991
- Best win: NPC Nationals middleweight champion; 1990
- Predecessor: David Dearth
- Successor: Vernon Gauthier

Patrick Calvin Lynn (born April 18, 1965) is an American professional bodybuilder.

== Bodybuilding career ==
=== Professional ===
==== Competition history ====
- 1990 NPC Nationals - 1st (MW)
- 1990 IFBB World Amateur Championships - 4th (MW)
- 1991 IFBB Night of Champions - DNP
- 1992 IFBB Chicago Pro Championships - 13th
- 1992 IFBB Ironman Pro Invitational - 12th
- 1993 IFBB Ironman Pro Invitational - 14th
- 1993 IFBB San Jose Pro Invitational - 8th
- 1994 IFBB Ironman Pro Invitational - 12th
- 1995 IFBB Florida Pro Invitational - 6th
- 1995 IFBB Ironman Pro Invitational - 4th
- 1995 IFBB San Jose Pro Invitational - 4th
- 1995 IFBB South Beach Pro Invitational - 6th
- 1996 IFBB Ironman Pro Invitational - 6th
- 1997 IFBB Ironman Pro Invitational - 6th
- 1998 IFBB Ironman Pro Invitational - 5th
- 1999 IFBB Arnold Classic - 11th
- 1999 IFBB Ironman Pro Invitational - 9th
- 1999 IFBB Night of Champions - DNP
- 2000 IFBB Arnold Classic - 16th
- 2000 IFBB Night of Champions - DNP

== Personal life ==
Patrick currently lives in Garden Grove, California. Since 1994, he has been the advisor and coach for professional bodybuilder Iris Kyle.
