= Yaxeni Oriquen-Garcia =

Venezuelan bodybuilder (born 1966)

- ♀ Professional bodybuilder
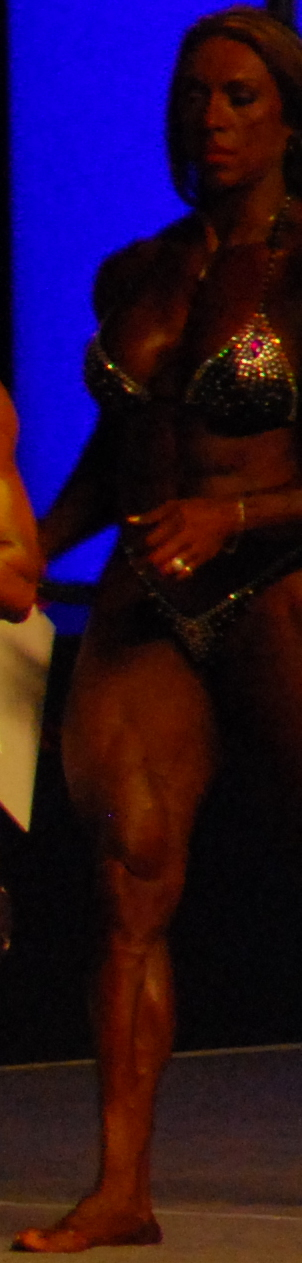
- Yaxeni Oriquen-Garcia on September 26, 2008, during the 2008 Ms. Olympia finals award ceremony.

Personal info
- Nickname: The Yaxeneger
- Née: Oriquen Pérez
- Full name: Yaxeni Oriquen-Garcia
- Born: Yaxeni Milagros Oriquen Pérez; September 3, 1966 (age 59); Cabimas, Zulia, Venezuela

Best statistics
- Bench press: 375 lb (170 kg)
- Biceps: 17 + inches (43 + cm)
- Calves: 17 inches (43 cm)
- Chest: 46 inches (120 cm)
- Contest weight: 160–180 lb (73–82 kg)
- Height: 5 ft 8 in (1.73 m)
- Off-season weight: 180–185 lb (82–84 kg)
- Quads: 27 + inches (69 + cm)

Professional (Pro) career
- Pro-debut: International Federation of Bodybuilders Pro Division (IFBB) Jan Tana Classic; 1994
- Best wins: IFBB Ms. Olympia champion; 2005
- Predecessor: Iris Kyle
- Successor: Iris Kyle
- Pro years: 1994–2020
Medal record
Ms. Olympia
3rd	2001 Ms. Olympia	Heavyweight (HW)
3rd	2003 Ms. Olympia	HW
3rd	2004 Ms. Olympia	HW
1st	2005 Ms. Olympia	Open
3rd	2007 Ms. Olympia	Open
3rd	2008 Ms. Olympia	Open
2nd	2010 Ms. Olympia	Open
2nd	2011 Ms. Olympia	Open
3rd	2012 Ms. Olympia	Open
IFBB Ms. International
1st	2002 Ms. International	Overall & HW
1st	2003 Ms. International	Overall & HW
2nd	2004 Ms. International	HW
1st	2005 Ms. International	Overall & HW
3rd	2006 Ms. International	Open
2nd	2007 Ms. International	Open
1st	2008 Ms. International	Open
3rd	2009 Ms. International	Open
2nd	2010 Ms. International	Open
2nd	2011 Ms. International	Open
1st	2012 Ms. International	Open
2nd	2013 Ms. International	Open
Jan Tana Classic
2nd	1999 Jan Tana Classic	Open
2nd	2001 Jan Tana Classic	Overall & HW
IFBB Rising Phoenix World Championships
3rd	2017 Rising Phoenix World Championships	Open
Other IFBB contests
3rd	1999 Pro Extravaganza	Open
2nd	2001 Pro Extravaganza	Overall & HW
1st	2002 Show of Strength Pro Championships	Overall & HW
1st	2004 Night of Champions	Overall & HW
1st	2004 Show of Strength Pro Championships	Overall & HW
1st	2010 Phoenix Pro	Open
1st	2016 Lenda Murray Pro	Open
2nd	2016 Omaha Pro	Open
3rd	2016 Puerto Rico Pro Championships	Open

Yaxeni Oriquen-Garcia (born Yaxeni Milagros Oriquen Pérez; September 3, 1966) is a Venezuelan-American retired professional bodybuilder. She has placed in the top three at the Ms. Olympia nine times from 2001 to 2012, winning the 2005 Ms. Olympia.

== Early life ==
Yaxeni Milagros Oriquen Pérez was born on September 3, 1966, in Cabimas, Zulia, Venezuela, the youngest of nine children (four brothers and four sisters). She began a career in theater and modeling at an early age and studied theater while in Venezuela.

== Bodybuilding career ==
=== Amateur ===
In 1989, she began dedicating herself to the sport of bodybuilding. She won four amateur contests in 1993, earning her professional card after winning Ibero (Central) American Championships. She then moved to the United States.

=== Professional ===
Her most noteworthy achievement as a professional was winning the Ms. Olympia title in 2005. She is the most successful female Venezuelan bodybuilder to date, the only one to win the Ms. Olympia title. She is the winner of five Ms. International titles, in 2002, 2003, 2005, 2008, and 2012. In 2011, she ranked as the second-best female bodybuilder in the International Federation of Bodybuilding and Fitness Pro Women's Bodybuilding Ranking List.

=== Competition history ===
- 1993 Venezuelan Nationals - 1st
- 1993 Ibero American - 1st
- 1993 Southern American - 1st
- 1993 Central American Championships - 1st
- 1994 Jan Tana Classic - 10th
- 1994 IFBB Grand Prix Prague - 6th
- 1995 Jan Tana Classic - 9th
- 1995 IFBB Grand Prix Prague - 5th
- 1996 Jan Tana Classic - 12th
- 1996 IFBB Grand Prix Prague - 6th
- 1996 IFBB Grand Prix Slovakia - 6th
- 1997 Jan Tana Classic - 6th
- 1998 IFBB Ms. International - 11th
- 1998 Jan Tana Classic - 4th
- 1998 IFBB Ms. Olympia - 10th
- 1999 IFBB Ms. International - 18th
- 1999 Jan Tana Classic - 2nd
- 1999 Women's Pro Extravaganza - 3rd
- 1999 Pro World Championship - 6th
- 1999 IFBB Ms. Olympia - 10th
- 2000 IFBB Ms. International - 6th (HW)
- 2000 Jan Tana Classic - 5th (HW)
- 2000 IFBB Ms. Olympia - 4th (HW)
- 2001 IFBB Ms. International - 4th (HW)
- 2001 Jan Tana Classic - 2nd (HW)
- 2001 Women's Pro Extravaganza - 2nd (HW)
- 2001 IFBB Ms. Olympia - 3rd (HW)
- 2002 IFBB Ms. International- 1st (HW and overall)
- 2002 GNC Show of Strength - 1st (HW and overall)
- 2002 IFBB Ms. Olympia - 4th (HW)
- 2003 IFBB Ms. International - 1st (HW and overall)
- 2003 IFBB Ms. Olympia - 3rd (HW)
- 2004 IFBB Ms. International - 2nd (HW)
- 2004 GNC Show of Strength - 1st (HW and overall)
- 2004 IFBB Night of Champions - 1st (HW)
- 2004 IFBB Ms. Olympia - 3rd (HW)
- 2005 IFBB Ms. International - 1st (HW and overall)
- 2005 IFBB Ms. Olympia - 1st
- 2006 IFBB Ms. International - 3rd
- 2006 IFBB Ms. Olympia - 7th
- 2007 IFBB Ms. International - 2nd
- 2007 IFBB Ms. Olympia - 3rd
- 2008 IFBB Ms. International - 1st
- 2008 IFBB Ms. Olympia - 3rd
- 2009 IFBB Ms. International - 3rd
- 2009 IFBB Ms. Olympia - 5th
- 2010 Phoenix Pro - 2nd
- 2010 IFBB Ms. International - 2nd
- 2010 IFBB Ms. Olympia - 2nd
- 2011 IFBB Ms. International - 2nd
- 2011 IFBB Ms. Olympia - 2nd
- 2012 IFBB Ms. International - 1st
- 2012 IFBB Ms. Olympia - 3rd
- 2013 IFBB Ms. International - 2nd
- 2013 IFBB Ms. Olympia - 4th
- 2014 IFBB Ms. Olympia - 5th
- 2015 IFBB Pro League WOS Rising Phoenix Pro Women's Bodybuilding - 4th
- 2016 IFBB Puerto Rico Pro - 3rd
- 2016 IFBB Omaha Pro - 2nd
- 2016 IFBB Lenda Murray Pro AM - 1st
- 2016 IFBB Pro League WOS Rising Phoenix Pro Women's Bodybuilding – 5th
- 2017 IFBB Pro League WOS Rising Phoenix Pro Women's Bodybuilding – 3rd
- 2020 IFBB WOS Ms. Olympia - 13th

=== Statistics ===
- Height - 5 ft 8 in (173 cm)
- On season weight - 160–180 lb (73–82 kg)
- Off season weight - 180–185 lb (82–84 kg)
- Biceps - 17 + inches (43 + cm)
- Calves - 17 inches (43 cm)
- Chest - 46 inches (120 cm)
- Quads - 27 + inches (69 + cm)

==== Lifts ====
- Bench press - 375 lb (170 kg)

== Personal life ==
In 1990, Oriquen had her only son, Luis Alcala, and currently resides in Miami, Florida, where she is the owner of Rypt Gym in Miami and work there as a personal trainer and fitness nutrition. She is an evangelical Christian.

Ms. Olympia
Preceded by: Iris Kyle	First (2005)	Succeeded by: Iris Kyle

Ms. International
Preceded by: Vickie Gates	First (2002)	Succeeded by: Herself
Preceded by: Herself	Second (2003)	Succeeded by: Iris Kyle
Preceded by: Iris Kyle	Third (2005)	Succeeded by: Iris Kyle
Preceded by: Iris Kyle	Fourth (2008)	Succeeded by: Iris Kyle
Preceded by: Iris Kyle	Fifth (2012)	Succeeded by: Iris Kyle
