= John J. Sherman =

American professional bodybuilder

- Professional bodybuilder

Personal info
- Nickname: The Tank
- Born: September 6, 1967 (age 58)

Best statistics
- Height: 5 ft 5 in (1.65 m)
- Weight: 186 lb (84 kg)

Professional (Pro) career
- Pro-debut: IFBB Pittsburgh Pro; 1993
- Best win: NPC USA Championships light-heavyweight and overall champion; 1992
- Predecessor: Kevin Levrone; Porter Cottrell
- Successor: Michael Francois; Daryl Stafford

John J. Sherman (born September 6, 1967) is an American professional bodybuilder.

== Education ==
John Sherman attended, from 1984 to 1988, the University of Houston.

== Deputy career ==
From September 1988 to September 1999, Sherman was a deputy for the Harris County Sheriff's Office.

== Bodybuilding career ==
=== Professional ===
==== Competition history ====
- 1987 NPC Texas State Championships - 1st (LW)
- 1988 NPC Collegiate Nationals - 1st (Overall and MW)
- 1988 NPC USA Championships - 3rd (MW)
- 1989 NPC USA Championships - 1st (MW)
- 1990 NPC Nationals - 4th (LHW)
- 1991 NPC Nationals - 5th (LHW)
- 1992 NPC Nationals - 1st (Overall and LHW)
- 1992 NPC USA Championships - 1st (LHW)
- 1993 IFBB Chicago Pro Championships - 2nd
- 1993 IFBB Grand Prix England - 12th
- 1993 IFBB Grand Prix Finland - 9th
- 1993 IFBB Grand Prix France (2) - 15th
- 1993 IFBB Grand Prix Germany (2) - 12th
- 1993 IFBB Grand Prix Spain - 10th
- 1993 IFBB Night of Champions - 3rd
- 1993 IFBB Mr. Olympia - DNP
- 1993 IFBB Pittsburgh Pro Invitational - 8th
- 1994 IFBB Chicago Pro Championships - 2nd
- 1994 IFBB Niagara Falls Pro Invitational - 2nd
- 1994 IFBB Night of Champions - 3rd
- 1994 IFBB Mr. Olympia - 16th
- 1995 IFBB Houston Pro Championships - 4th
- 2000 IFBB Night of Champions - DNP
- 2000 IFBB Toronto Pro - 15th
- 2001 IFBB Ironman Pro Invitational - 9th
- 2001 IFBB San Francisco Pro - 7th
- 2007 IFBB New York Pro Championships - 10th
- 2010 IFBB Phoenix Pro - 11th (Open)
- 2013 IFBB Chicago Pro Championships - 6th (LW)
- 2013 IFBB Phoenix Pro - 9th (LW)
- 2014 IFBB Phoenix Pro - 6th (LW)

== Personal life ==
Sherman is a Christian. He currently lives in Houston, Texas. He is currently the owner of Fitness Fanatics and Great Earth Vitamins (since March 2007).
