= Powerhouse Gym =

Gym and health club

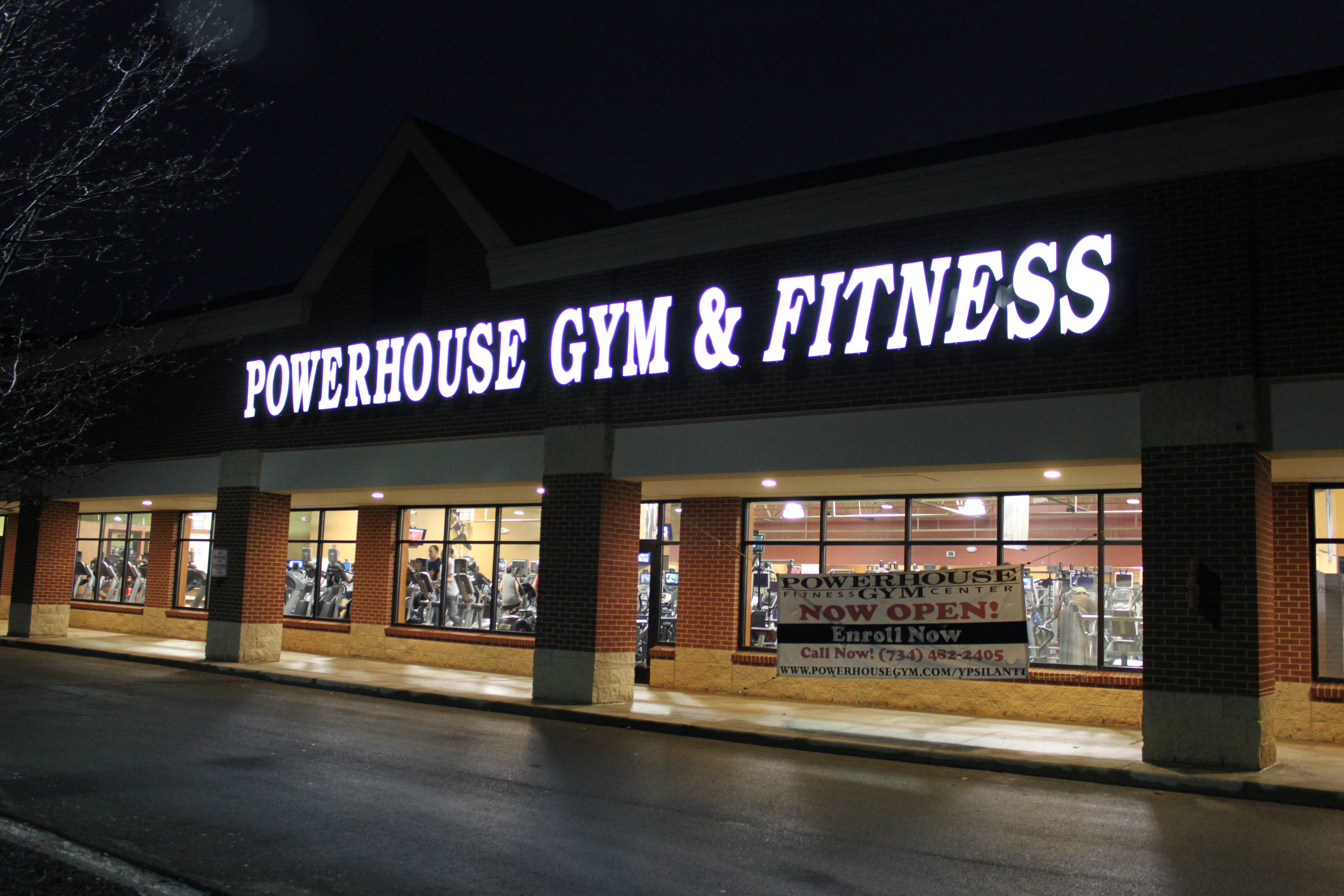
- Powerhouse Gym & Fitness location in Michigan
- Company type: Private
- Industry: Fitness, Health Club
- Founded: 1974
- Founder: William Dabish, Norman Dabish
- Headquarters: Highland Park, Michigan
- Website: powerhousegym.com

Powerhouse Gym logo.

Powerhouse Gym is made up of more than 200 fitness center owners who are licensed to use the Powerhouse Gym format.

== History ==
Powerhouse Gym was founded in 1974 by brothers William and Norman Dabish in Highland Park, Michigan. The gym started out as a facility for people in the neighborhood to exercise and soon became a place for professional athletes to train, such as boxer Tommy "Hitman" Hearns and bodybuilders Samir Bannout and Tom Platz. In 1984, Powerhouse Gym began a licensing division, eventually operating in 39 states across the United States, and in 15 countries.

== Additional information ==
In addition to the expansion of Powerhouse Gym they have been able to create other marketing tools that also have grown with the company. In 1984 Powerhouse created their own clothing line. Starting with only four small items, over the years their clothing and accessory line is now one of the largest in the fitness industry. Powerhouse published a magazine, Powerhouse Magazine, in 1992. It discussed business ventures and company updates. In 2002, the company created Powerhouse T.V., a personalized network enabling gym owners to

control advertisements and music played.
