= Kristy Hawkins =

American bodybuilder

- Professional bodybuilder

Personal info
- Born: August 28, 1980 (age 45); Longview, Texas, U.S.

Best statistics
- Height: 5 ft 4 in (1.63 m)
- Weight: In Season: 135 lb (61 kg); Off-Season: 160–170 lb (73–77 kg)

Professional (Pro) career
- Pro-debut: IFBB Ms. International; 2008
- Best win: NPC Nationals; 2007
- Predecessor: Lora Ottenad
- Successor: Sheila Bleck
- Active: Retired 2011

Kristy Michelle Hawkins (born August 28, 1980) is an American powerlifter and chemical engineer, and former professional female bodybuilder.

== Early life and education ==
Kristy Hawkins was born and raised in Longview, Texas, in 1980. In 1994, she started attending Longview High School. In 1998, she graduated from high school and started attending Texas A&M University that same year. She earned her Bachelor of Science in Chemical Engineering from Texas A&M University in 2002, graduating summa cum laude and with University and Foundation Honors. She earned a Master of Science in Chemical Engineering at the California Institute of Technology (Caltech) in 2005. She graduated from Caltech in 2008 with a Ph.D. in chemical engineering.

== Career in chemical/biological engineering ==
In 1999, Hawkins worked as an intern for the Eastman Chemical Company and from 2000 to 2002 she worked again as an intern for the Solutia Inc. From November 2008 to August 8, 2013, she moved to Emeryville, California, where she got a job as scientist for metabolic engineering of Saccharomyces cerevisiae at Amyris Inc. Starting August 19, 2013, she worked as director of yeast engineering for the company Lygos. She has since left Lygos and co-founded a chemical engineering company called Antheia.

== Bodybuilding ==
=== Amateur ===
Hawkins has described herself as having been very heavy in elementary school. She took dance lessons and became a twirler, but says that she wasn't active enough and didn't have proper eating habits. She suffered from anorexia nervosa, which led her to starve herself. She eventually got into the gym to burn calories. At first she started with cardio and then weight training. At the age of 15 years, she got her own gym membership and went every day after school and work. The owners were hosting a competition and taught her the basics of training, nutrition, and posing. At the age of 17, she traveled with some people from her gym to Mississippi for an ANPPC show and placed 3rd in the novice women’s short class. She twice placed in the top four at the NPC Nationals. In November 2007, she won the light-heavyweight and overall at the NPC Nationals and received her IFBB pro card.

=== Professional ===
After turning professional, she attended her first professional competition, the 2008 Ms. International, where she placed 14th. In 2009, she attended her first Ms. Olympia, which she placed 7th.

When training and competing specifically for bodybuilding, she consumed 2,500–3,000 calories a day and her contest weight was around 140 pounds and roughly 165 pounds when off season. Hawkins says that she didn't really track her body-fat numbers, but mostly just went by how she looked.

=== Contest history ===
- 1998 ANPPC Mississippi Open - 3rd (Novice Women Short Class)
- 1998 AAU Mr/Mrs Southwest America - 1st (Novice Women Medium Class) and Best Poser
- 1999 AAU Mr/Mrs Southwest America - 1st (Open Women Short Class) and Best Poser
- 2000 ANPPC Southwest USA Natural Bodybuilding Championships - 3rd (Novice Women Short Class)
- 2002 NPC Michigan Championships - 1st (LW)
- 2002 NPC Pittsburgh Open - 3rd (LW)
- 2003 NPC Ronnie Coleman Classic - 1st (MW)
- 2003 NPC Pittsburgh Open -1st (MW & overall)
- 2003 NPC Lone Star Classic - 1st (HW & overall)
- 2003 NPC Jr. Nationals - 4th (MW)
- 2004 NPC Jr. Nationals - 5th (LHW)
- 2004 IFBB North Americans - 4th (LHW)
- 2005 NPC Nationals - 4th (LHW)
- 2006 NPC Nationals - 3rd (LHW)
- 2007 NPC Nationals - 1st (LHW & overall)
- 2008 IFBB Ms. International - 14th
- 2009 IFBB Atlantic City Pro - 2nd
- 2009 IFBB Ms. Olympia - 7th
- 2010 IFBB New York Pro - 10th

== Powerlifting ==
In 2011, Hawkins stepped away from professional bodybuilding and has successfully stepped into the realm of powerlifting, while maintaining a "bodybuilder" type look to her physique. She has stated that when she was just starting this sport she managed to squat 400 pounds.

=== World records ===
Date	Record broken	Class	Lift	Fed
08/20/16	Total (no wraps)	165 lb (75 kg)	1,328 lb (602 kg)	WRPF
11/05/16	Squat (no wraps)	165 lb (75 kg)	496 lb (225 kg)	SPF
11/12/17	All Squats (with & without wraps)	165 lb (75 kg)	573 lb (260 kg)	SPF
11/12/17	All Totals (with & without wraps)	165 lb (75 kg)	1,434 lb (650 kg)	SPF

=== Competition history ===
Date	Fed	Location	Meet Name	Division	Equip	Class	Weight	Squat	Bench	Deadlift	Total	Wilks	Place
2014-11-09	SPF	California, United States	Women's Pro/Am	F-L-R	Raw	165 lb (75 kg)	161.5 lb (73.3 kg)	407.9 lb (185.0 kg)	220.5 lb (100.0 kg)	418.9 lb (190.0 kg)	1,047.2 lb (475.0 kg)	458.36 lb (207.91 kg)	3rd
2015-02-07	USPA	California, United States	American Cup Los Angeles Fit Expo	Open	Raw	165 lb (75 kg)	163 lb (74 kg)	413.4 lb (187.5 kg)	264.6 lb (120.0 kg)	474 lb (215 kg)	1,151.9 lb (522.5 kg)	501.21 lb (227.35 kg)	1st
2015-03-29	SPF	California, United States	March Madness Powerlifting Open	F-L-R	Raw		164 lb (74 kg)	440.9 lb (200.0 kg)	285.6 lb (129.5 kg)	451.9 lb (205.0 kg)	1,179.5 lb (535.0 kg)	511.22 lb (231.89 kg)	2nd
2015-06-27	SPF	California, United States	Summer Slam	F-L-R	Raw		163 lb (74 kg)	457.5 lb (207.5 kg)	297.6 lb (135.0 kg)	501.6 lb (227.5 kg)	1,256.6 lb (570.0 kg)	546.76 lb (248.01 kg)	1st
2015-11-07	SPF	California, United States	Reebok Record Breakers	F-L-R	Raw	165 lb (75 kg)	163.6 lb (74.2 kg)	451.9 lb (205.0 kg)	308.6 lb (140.0 kg)	537.9 lb (244.0 kg)	1,298.5 lb (589.0 kg)	563.67 lb (255.68 kg)	2nd
2016-03-20	SPF	California, United States	CSA March Madness	F-L-R	Raw		164 lb (74 kg)	485 lb (220 kg)	314.2 lb (142.5 kg)	518.1 lb (235.0 kg)	1,317.2 lb (597.5 kg)	570.93 lb (258.97 kg)	1st
2016-08-20	WRPF	California, United States	Boss of Bosses 3 Invitational	FR-O	Raw	165 lb (75 kg)	164.4 lb (74.6 kg)	490.5 lb (222.5 kg)	319.7 lb (145.0 kg)	518.1 lb (235.0 kg)	1,328.3 lb (602.5 kg)	574.84 lb (260.74 kg)	1st
2016-11-05	SPF	California, United States	Reebok Record Breakers	F-L-R	Raw	165 lb (75 kg)	165 lb (75 kg)	496 lb (225 kg)	314.2 lb (142.5 kg)	507.1 lb (230.0 kg)	1,317.3 lb (597.5 kg)	568.77 lb (257.99 kg)	2nd
2017-04-15	USPA	California, United States	CETC US Open Powerlifting Championships	Open	Warps	165 lb (75 kg)	163.1 lb (74.0 kg)	540.1 lb (245.0 kg)	308.6 lb (140.0 kg)	529.1 lb (240.0 kg)	1,377.9 lb (625.0 kg)	599.22 lb (271.80 kg)	1st
2017-11-11	SPF	California, United States	Reebok Record Breakers	F-L-R	Warps	165 lb (75 kg)	163 lb (74 kg)	573.2 lb (260.0 kg)	314.2 lb (142.5 kg)	546.7 lb (248.0 kg)	1,434.1 lb (650.5 kg)	623.99 lb (283.04 kg)	1st

== Personal life ==
Hawkins is an agnostic. She was for a time in a serious relationship with bodybuilder Branden Ray, but is now single. She currently lives in Emeryville, California.
