= Heather Foster =

Jamaican-born American professional bodybuilder

- Professional bodybuilder

Personal info
- Born: December 20, 1966 (age 59); Kingston, Jamaica

Best statistics
- Height: 5 ft 5 in (1.65 m)
- Weight: In Season: 150 lb (68 kg); Off-Season: 195 lb (88 kg)

Professional (Pro) career
- Pro-debut: IFBB Women's Pro Extravaganza; 2001
- Best win: IFBB Women's Pro Extravaganza heavyweight and overall champion; 2001
- Predecessor: Laura Creavalle
- Successor: None
- Active: Retired since 2011

Heather D. Foster (born December 20, 1966) is a Jamaican American professional bodybuilder.

== Early life and education ==
Heather Foster was born in 1966 in Kingston, Jamaica. She has two brothers and one sister. Her parents migrated to Jamaica, Queens, New York City, New York, when she was two and half years old. She was always a very active child, not wanting to make potholders in Girl Scouts, but rather go outside and play stick ball, basketball and sprint against the boys. She has always been into sports: participating in competitive high school and college track & field, and playing junior high school, high school and college basketball.

Heather, her sister, and younger brother all started playing in the church basketball league after their father insisted they did. She studied classical piano for 10 years, performing in numerous concerts as a young girl. She filled in at church, and often played for a few gospel group engagements. She attended Bayside High School and joined the chorus. She joined the high school chorus as a sophomore. Her teacher saw a gift in me and decided to sign me up to audition for New York State Voice. They were only accepting 300 students from various New York high schools, and she was selected with a score of 99 out of 100. While in high school, our church choir competed in, and won the 3rd annual McDonald's Gospelfest, which awarded us the opportunity to perform in two concerts at the famed Apollo Theater, where she performed one and a half leads for both scheduled performances. Due to vocal inactivity, she is not as good as she used to be.

After high school, Heather attended to City College of New York where she studied physical education, and LaGuardia Community College, where she studied physical therapy. She has been practicing physical therapy since 1991, and specializing in sports medicine and rehabilitation. She also has experience in geriatric and pediatric physical therapy. She regularly gives seminars in health, fitness, and training for a wide variety of individuals including staff, students, professors, artists, dancers, and martial artists.

== Bodybuilding career ==
=== Amateur ===
In 1990, while attending the City College of New York, the college was holding their very first bodybuilding competition. Lyndon Brown, Heather's friend, took it upon himself to start recruiting some female bodybuilders since they didn't have enough women participants. Heather, who originally wanted nothing to do with bodybuilding, got approached by him about participating in the competition and explained what would be expected of me. She rejected his request after learning she had to wear a two-piece bathing suit. She was on the CCNY women's basketball and track teams and had always been muscular, even as a child in junior high school.

Eventually Heather agreed to do the show. She was taught the seven mandatory poses and told to put a routine together to music. On competition day she was so nervous that she wore shades on stage so she wouldn't see anyone in the crowd and she demanded they dim the house lights for the same reason. She placed second in the heavyweight class and managed to do so without lighting a single weight prior to the competition. She competed a few natural bodybuilding contests in Upstate New York before switching to National Physique Committee contests that don't drug test. She injured herself five weeks before the 1999 NPC Nationals and could not attend another show till the 2000 NPC Nationals, in which she won and turned pro.

=== Professional ===
In 2001, at her pro debut, Heather won the heavyweight and overall at the 2001 IFBB Women's Pro Extravaganza, which qualified her for her first Ms. Olympia. At the 2001 Ms. Olympia, she placed 7th due to the fact that she could not finish competing beyond the prejudging due to being sick. At the 2006 IFBB Pro League Southwest Pro, she won her second professional contest. In 2008 and 2009, she did not compete due to osteitis pubis. At the 2010 Ms. Olympia, she placed 6th, her best placing at the Ms. Olympia. In 2010, she placed 6th place at the Ms. Olympia. Her coach was bodybuilder Derrick Brown.

Heather's routines have gained so much notoriety that an eight time Mr. Olympia Ronnie Coleman contracted her to do his routine for the past two years. Flexonline went so far as to state that his routine at the 2006 Mr. Olympia "was arguably the best routine ever seen on an Olympia stage." She also does music arrangements, voice-overs, choreography, training, and contest preparation for regional, national and professional bodybuilders. She is also a regional judge. She is regarded as a bodybuilding prodigy.

=== Contest history ===
- 1992 NPC Atlantic States Championships - 3rd (HW)
- 1995 Eastern USA - 1st (MW and overall)
- 1995 NPC USA Nationals - 4th (MW)
- 1996 NPC USA Nationals - 1st (HW)
- 1996 NPC Nationals - 6th (HW)
- 1997 NPC USA Nationals - 5th (HW)
- 1997 NPC Nationals - 2nd (HW)
- 1998 NPC Nationals - 7th (HW)
- 1999 NPC USA Nationals - 3rd (HW)
- 2000 NPC Nationals - 1st (HW and overall)
- 2001 IFBB Jan Tana Classic - 4th (HW)
- 2001 IFBB Women's Pro Extravaganza - 1st (HW and overall)
- 2001 IFBB Ms. Olympia - 7th (HW)
- 2002 IFBB Jan Tana Classic - 4th (HW)
- 2003 IFBB Ms. International - 5th (HW)
- 2003 IFBB Night of Champions - 6th (HW)
- 2004 IFBB Night of Champions - 3rd (HW)
- 2004 IFBB Southwest Pro Cup - 3rd (HW)
- 2005 IFBB Europa Super Show - 5th (HW)
- 2005 IFBB New York Pro - 2nd (HW)
- 2006 IFBB Europa Super Show - 1st
- 2006 IFBB Ms. Olympia - 12th
- 2007 IFBB Sacramento Pro - 7th (HW)
- 2007 IFBB Atlantic City Pro - 5th (HW)
- 2010 IFBB New York Pro - 3rd
- 2010 IFBB Ms. Olympia - 6th
- 2011 IFBB Europa Battle of Champions - 16th
- 2011 IFBB Ms. Olympia - 12th

=== Best statistics ===
- Bench press - 315 lb (143 kg)
- Bicep curls - 45 lb (20 kg)
- Biceps - 17 1/2 inches (44 cm)
- On season weight - 150–165 1/2 lb (68.0–75.1 kg)
- Thighs - 27 inches (69 cm)

== Personal life ==
Heather currently lives in Jamaica, Queens, New York City, New York. She had a boyfriend named Tony. She sings for the New York City Master Chorale.
