= Anne Freitas =

Brazilian professional female bodybuilder

Anne Luise Freitas
- professional bodybuilder
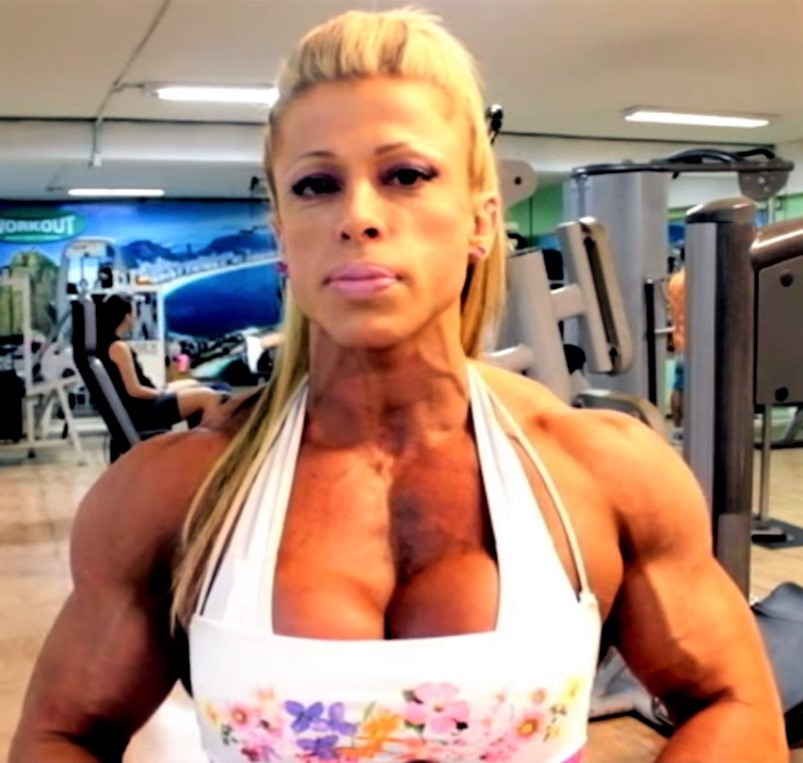
- Freitas discusses her workout in 2017

Personal info
- Born: September 20, 1975 (age 49); Criciúma, Santa Catarina, Brazil

Best statistics
- Height: 5 ft 2 in (1.57 m)
- Weight: In season: 121.3 lb Off-Season: 147.7 lb

Professional (Pro) career
- Pro-debut: IFBB Europa Battle of Champions; 2012
- Best win: IFBB Europa Champion; 2012
- Predecessor: Kim Buck
- Successor: Current titleholder

Anne Luise Becke Machado Freitas (born in 1975) is a Brazilian professional female bodybuilder.

== Early life ==
Anne Freitas was born a middle child, having an older brother and a younger sister. She was intrigued with physical strength at an early age but did not actively pursue physical fitness until her late teens. Over the span of six years, Freitas developed significant gains in her physique. In 2006, Freitas met fitness trainer Ricardo Pannain who encouraged her to enter her first competition two years later.

== Bodybuilding career ==
In 2008, Freitas competed in the figure category and won both state and national competitions. In 2009, she switched to bodybuilding. At age 37, Freitas participated in the 2012’s IFBB Europa Battle Of Champions, where she became champion in her first IFBB event, marking her debut as a pro.

=== Contest history ===
- 2008 State Competition – 1st
- 2008 National Competition – 1st
- 2009 South American Competition – 1st
- 2009 World Championship – 1st (later tested positive and lost the title)
- 2012 IFBB Europa Battle of Champions – 1st
- 2012 IFBB Ms. Olympia – 8th
- 2013 IFBB Toronto Pro Supershow – 2nd
- 2013 IFBB Ms. Olympia - 9th
- 2014 IFBB Omaha Pro - 1st
- 2014 IFBB Ms. Olympia - 6th

== Personal life ==
Freitas is married to Ricardo Pannain and lives in Brazil. Freitas has a daughter named Aimeé. Freitas is fluent in four languages including English, Portuguese, Spanish and French. In her spare time, she plays recreational tennis. She also enjoys Ballet and Jazz.
