= Debi Laszewski =

American professional female bodybuilder (born 1969)

- Professional bodybuilder

Personal info
- Born: September 29, 1969 (age 56); Wausau, Wisconsin, U.S.

Best statistics
- Height: 5 ft 2.5 in (1.59 m)
- Weight: In Season: 144–145 lb (65–66 kg); Off-Season: 154 lb (70 kg)

Professional (Pro) career
- Pro-debut: IFBB Europa Super Show; 2007
- Best win: NPC Nationals; 2006
- Predecessor: Dena Westerfield
- Successor: Kristy Hawkins
- Active: 1993-2015 (Retired)

Debi Laszewski (born September 29, 1969) is an American retired professional female bodybuilder. She ranks as the 3rd best female bodybuilder in the IFBB Pro Women's Bodybuilding Ranking List.

== Early life and education ==
Debi Laszewski was born 1969 in Wausau, Wisconsin, where she was raised, and was the second of two children. She played track and field while attending Wausau West High. After graduating high school, Laszewski attended Madison Area Technical College.

== Bodybuilding career ==
=== Amateur ===
Laszewski was 20 years old when she started in bodybuilding. She started lifting after being motivated by the physique of Linda Hamilton in The Terminator. She did her first competition at the age of 24. It was a natural show and she won her class.

Laszewski was stunned by the judges' decision in a 2000 USA contest, which turned her dreams of turning pro upside-down. As she later reflected, she entered the competition confident that her physique was impressive and feminine, and other contestants believed she was top of the class. Instead of finishing near the top, she finished 7th place. Laszewski said she did not apply herself in the 2001 competition nearly as hard, saying, "I just didn't have it anymore". She finished 12th in that competition, and placed nominal attention to bodybuilding competition for the next four years as a result. Between 2001 and 2005, Laszewski did not enter a single pro competition. Laszewski remained primarily a personal trainer without plans to compete professionally until 2005, when the introduction of the "light-heavyweight class" created a niche she felt more at ease with. Laszewski remained noticeably shorter and more compact than her competition, but believed she could shine against a larger group without the need to consistently lose weight, "I wasn’t as stripped down", Laszewski stated, and even so, a judge for the NPC said, "Don’t squeeze anything. Just show your shape."

Laszewski returned to professional competition in 2005, and finished second place in the NPC in a highly-controversial judging decision. Laszewski was initially encouraged by the possibility of a win in the newly formed light-heavyweight class and entered several amateur Southern States competitions. She sent in photographs and entered herself into the NPC championships in 2005. Laszewski and her boyfriend noticed considerable attention to her physique, and believed she would win first-place. Laszewski confronted judges backstage, and wanted answers as to why she placed second behind Dena Westerfield. Laszewski was frustrated with the judges' paradoxical explanations, as they said her back was too defined and detailed, which would render well in a professional league, but not in an amateur pre-qualifier. Laszewski felt she was trapped in a catch-22 where her strong physique was better suited to the professional league, but she could not enter the league without winning the amateurs. Laszewski and her boyfriend were highly disappointed, and spoke with Amanda Dunbar and Debbie Bramwell, two competitors close to her about the judging decision. A photographer caught a photograph backstage following the event, with a noticeably anxious Laszewski discussing the matter with her fellow competitors. Gene X Magazine interviewed Laszewski and said she was clearly disappointed and felt somewhat hopeless in her chances of advancing towards the pros, "I always seem to do the wrong show at the wrong time", she said the day after her competition. She learned from the judges that she finished only 2 points away from Dena in the judging tally. Laszewski said she would have preferred to finish 6th or 7th than to come so teasingly close.

Laszewski has had a very mixed experience with physique contest judges. She said that one judge marked her down because she was "too pretty" for her degree of muscularity, and took a poor ranking in 2000 because of guidelines set down to the judges targeting women that were "too big". Laszewski has taken some advice about enhancing a feminine X-shaped torso with great conviction. She has been encouraged and said she uses her creativity to enhance her physique for what the judges want consistently, even developing her own exercises to best meet those goals. Despite her disagreements with judging decisions in 2000 and 2005, Laszewski told Bodybuilding.com in 2010 that she believed the judging system overall was fair. Laszewski turned pro after winning her class at the 2006 Nationals in Miami.

=== Professional ===
Since 2009, Laszewski has placed in the top six of every single Ms. International and Ms. Olympia held that year. Laszewski finished 2nd in the 2012 Ms. Olympia, placing her as runner-up to Iris Kyle. This was her best performance in a professional IFBB event for her entire career, and she was considered a serious threat to the reigning champion, Iris Kyle. In interviews, she said the reason she was able to improve her standing was by speaking with judges and learning that her muscle mass was judged negatively for reducing her feminine shape. Laszewski said she reduced the size of her waistline for the contest by eliminating certain exercises from her workouts. She also admitted to doing no cardio for 6 weeks prior to the contest, a strong contrast to Nathalia Melo, the 2012 Bikini Olympia winner, who ran 10–12 miles a day for her competition. Her 2nd-place finish in the 2012 Ms. Olympia automatically enters her as one of five contestants to pre-qualify for the 2013 Ms. Olympia, to be held September 27, 2013. Following the 2012 Olympia, Laszewski categorized her current status as near "a pinnacle" where she could finally reap the results of years of work. She told an interviewer that she was confident that she could win the Ms. Olympia 2013 and Ms. International 2013. According to Muscle Insider, Laszewski was predicted to take 3rd place in the 2013 Ms. International contest, behind Iris Kyle and Yaxeni Oriquen, which she did at the 2013 Ms. International.

=== Contest history ===
- 1994 Wisconsin Natural Bodybuilding Championships - 1st (class winner)
- 1996 Madison Championships - 1st (overall)
- 1996 Wisconsin National Qualifier - 1st (overall)
- 1996 NPC Nationals 7th (middleweight)
- 1997 NPC Jr. Nationals, 2nd (middleweight)
- 1998 NPC USA, 3rd (heavyweight)
- 1998 IFBB North American Bodybuilding Championships - 4th (heavyweight)
- 1999 NPC Nationals - 6th (heavyweight)
- 2000 NPC USA - 7th (heavyweight)
- 2001 NPC Nationals - 12th (heavyweight)
- 2005 NPC Nationals - 2nd (light heavyweight)
- 2006 NPC Nationals - 1st (light heavyweight)
- 2007 IFBB Europa Super Show - 3rd (lightweight)
- 2008 IFBB Ms. International - 12th
- 2008 IFBB New York Pro - 5th
- 2009 IFBB Ms. International - 2nd
- 2009 IFBB Ms. Olympia - 3rd
- 2010 IFBB Ms. International - 3rd
- 2010 IFBB Ms. Olympia - 3rd
- 2011 IFBB Ms. International - 4th
- 2011 IFBB Ms. Olympia - 4th
- 2012 IFBB Ms. International - 2nd
- 2012 IFBB Ms. Olympia - 2nd
- 2013 IFBB Ms. International - 3rd
- 2013 IFBB Ms. Olympia - 3rd
- 2014 IFBB Ms. Olympia - 3rd
- 2015 IFBB Wings of Strength Rising Phoenix World Championships - 3rd

== Personal life ==
Laszewski has an interest in home decorating and interior design. She gave a tour of her home to Muscular Development in 2011. She is an official sponsored athlete of Ironville Clothing Company, which sells bodybuilding-themed sportswear.

=== Personal training ===
Laszewski is a personal trainer who lives in Jupiter, Florida. Some of her clients are: Mr. Bahamas 2011 Robert Harris, Southern States contestant Chad Awad, 2010 NPC Southern States 1st-place winner Beth Wachter photographer Blake Reagan, and professional women's figure contestant Traci Pate. She has an older sister who competes as a pro bodybuilder in the natural federation.

George Farah, who is also her boyfriend, served as her nutritionist and prepared her for many of her competitions. Laszewski told reporters at BodyBuilding.com that she was to release a coffee table book during the Ms. Arnold contest in 2010. Reportedly, the book was a 4-year project for Laszewski and would contain 70 photos of her across the country, each with spiritual quotes. Laszewski stated that her reason for creating the book was to educate readers about female bodybuilding in an artful way.
