= Brigita Brezovac =

Slovenian retired professional bodybuilder

- Professional bodybuilder

Personal info
- Born: September 24, 1979 (age 46); Ptuj, SR Slovenia, Yugoslavia

Best statistics
- Height: 5 ft 4 in (1.63 m)
- Weight: In Season: 143 lb (65 kg); Off-Season: 154 lb (70 kg)

Professional (Pro) career
- Pro-debut: IFBB Tampa Pro; 2010
- Best win: IFBB Toronto Pro Supershow; 2011
- Predecessor: None
- Successor: Lisa Giesbrecht
- Active: Retired 2013

Brigita Brezovac (September 24, 1979) is a retired Slovenian professional bodybuilder.

== Early life and education ==
Brezovac grew up in Ljutomer, Slovenia. She attended the SETUAŠ school in Murska Sobota, Slovenia, and the University of Maribor.

== Bodybuilding career ==
=== Amateur ===
At the age of 14, Brezovac had a boyfriend who had a small gym at his home. When she saw the photos of Cory Everson and Anja Langer, she decided she wanted to be a bodybuilder and lift weights, along with training for karate.

In 2001, after only three months of preparations, Brezovac competed in the 2001 World championship in the category Miss Bodybuilding and stood fourth. Later, she went into the Miss Fitness category due to an injury. In 2004, at the World Championship, the prejudgers disqualified her from the fitness class and put her into the bodybuilding category because she was too muscular. She went on to win the bodybuilding class. After that, she was told that she should compete in bodybuilding because her physique was more appropriate for it.

In 2009, Brezovac competed at the IFBB, World Women's Championship. She placed second in the bodybuilding heavy weight class and was awarded her IFBB pro card in December 2009.

=== Professional ===
In 2010, the year of her pro-debut, she won the IFBB bodybuilding competitions of Tampa Pro and Europa Battle of Champions. She qualified for her first Ms. Olympia that year, and placed tenth in it. In 2011, she won the Toronto Pro Super Show and came third at the Tampa Pro and attended her second Ms. Olympia that year and placed third. In 2012 and 2013, every Ms. International and Ms. Olympia competition she attended she placed within the top six every time.

=== Retirement ===
After attending the 2013 Ms. Olympia, Brezovac retired from bodybuilding.

=== Legacy ===
In 2013, the year she retired, Brezovac ranked as the 5th best female bodybuilder in the IFBB Pro Women's Bodybuilding Ranking List.

=== Competition history ===
- 2001 World championship IBFA Koper, Slovenia (Miss Body Building) - 4th
- 2004 World championship IBFA Koper, Slovenia (Miss Body Building) - 1st
- 2004 Grand Prix Trofeo Athenas Venezia, Italy (Miss Body Building) - 2nd
- 2005 European championship NABBA Solingen, Germany (Miss Physique) - 2nd
- 2005 European championship IBFA Sapri, Italy (Miss Physique) - 1st
- 2006 World championship Universe WPF Le Grande Motte, France (Miss Physique) - 1st
- 2006 Slovenian Open IBFA Maribor, Slovenia (Miss Bodybuilding) - 1st
- 2006 World championship IBFA Las Vegas, USA (Miss Bodybuilding) - 1st and overall
- 2006 World championship IBFA Las Vegas, USA (Mixed pairs) - 1st
- 2006 World championship Universe NAC Cuxhaven, Germany (Miss Body) - 1st
- 2007 World championship Universe NABBA Southport, UK (Miss Physique) - 2nd
- 2007 Grand Prix Dionysopolis Balchik, Bolgaria (Miss bodybuilding) - 1st and overall
- 2007 Grand Prix Due Torri Bologna, Italy (Miss hard) - 3rd
- 2007 World championship Universe NAC Hamburg, Germany (Miss Body) - 1st
- 2009 Grand Prix Dionysopolis Balchik, Bolgaria (Miss bodybuilding) - 1st and overall
- 2009 World's Women Championship Como, Italy (Bodybuilding, heavy weight) - 2nd
- 2010 IFBB Tampa Pro - 1st
- 2010 IFBB Europa Battle of Champions - 1st
- 2010 IFBB Ms. Olympia - 10th
- 2011 IFBB Toronto Pro Super Show - 1st
- 2011 IFBB Pro Bodybuilding Weekly Championships - 3rd
- 2011 IFBB Ms. Olympia - 3rd
- 2012 IFBB Ms. International - 6th
- 2012 IFBB Ms. Olympia - 5th
- 2013 IFBB Ms. International - 4th
- 2013 IFBB Ms. Olympia - 5th

== Fitness career ==
=== Contest history ===
- 2001 International Miss Fitness Kitzbuehl (Austria) - 3rd
- 2002 Slovenian Open IBFA Koper, Slovenia (Miss Fitness) - 1st
- 2002 World championship IBFA Taranto, Italy (Miss Fitness) - 4th
- 2003 Slovenian Open IBFA Koper, Slovenia (Miss Fitness) - 3rd
- 2003 World championship IBFA Auxerre, France (Mixed Pairs) - 1st
- 2004 World championship WABBA Bangalore, India (Miss Fitness) - 3rd
- 2004 World championship WFF Vilnius, Lithuania (Extreme Body) - 4th

== Personal life ==
She trained as black belt in karate for eight years, was a national champion in fights for a few years and competed up to 116 lb (53 kg). She also did taekwondo and boxing. Other professions of her included coaching, economist, masseuse and personal trainer. She spoke English, German, Croatian and Serbian. She currently lives in Maribor, Slovenia.
