= Tina Chandler =

American professional female bodybuilder

- Professional bodybuilder

Personal info
- Nickname: TC
- Born: September 2, 1974 (age 51); Shreveport, Louisiana U.S.

Best statistics
- Height: 5 ft 4 in (1.63 m)
- Weight: In Season: 125 lb (57 kg); Off-Season: 145 lb (66 kg)

Professional (Pro) career
- Pro-debut: IFBB New York Pro; 2008
- Best win: NPC Nationals; 2007
- Predecessor: Lisa Bickels
- Successor: Diana Tinnelle

Tina Chandler (born September 2, 1974) is an American professional female bodybuilder.

== Early life and education ==
Tina Chandler was born in 1974 in Shreveport, Louisiana, the second of three children. She grew up in Conroe and Willis, Texas. She attended Sam Houston State University.

== Bodybuilding career ==
=== Amateur ===
During her childhood, Tina was a competitive gymnast; in addition to all the sports available at the schools she attended (volleyball, track, basketball, tennis, cycling, cheerleading), she got involved in weight training from the sports. Soon after, her career as a gymnast had ended and she needed something to get her in shape, so she sought information from the magazine Muscle and Fitness. She soon found herself in the weight room more and more was pleased with the results she was getting quickly. She attended her first bodybuilding competition, the SW Texas State, in 2004, which she won. She won her IFBB pro card after coming in 1st in the middleweight class at the 2007 NPC Nationals.

=== Professional ===
In 2009, Tina attended her first Ms. Olympia competition, which she placed 10th.

=== Contest history ===
- 2004 SW Texas State - 1st (MW)
- 2005 Lone Star Classic - 1st (MW and overall)
- 2005 NPC USA - 2nd (MW)
- 2006 NPC USA - 1st (MW)
- 2006 NPC Nationals - 5th (MW)
- 2007 NPC Nationals - 1st (MW)
- 2008 IFBB New York Pro - 7th
- 2009 IFBB Tampa Pro - 3rd
- 2009 IFBB Ms Olympia - 10th
- 2010 IFBB Tampa Pro - 2nd
- 2010 IFBB Ms. Olympia - 8th
- 2011 IFBB Ms. International - 8th
- 2011 IFBB Ms. Olympia - 10th
- 2011 IFBB Tampa Pro Championships - 2nd
- 2012 IFBB Ms. International - 13th
- 2013 IFBB Chicago Pro Championships - 3rd
- 2013 IFBB Tampa Pro Championships - 4th
- 2013 IFBB Ms. Olympia - 12th

== Personal life ==
Chandler currently lives in Houston, Texas.

== See also ==
- Female bodybuilding
- List of female professional bodybuilders
