= The Orleans =

Casino resort in Las Vegas, Nevada

Coordinates: 36.104596°N 115.201607°W

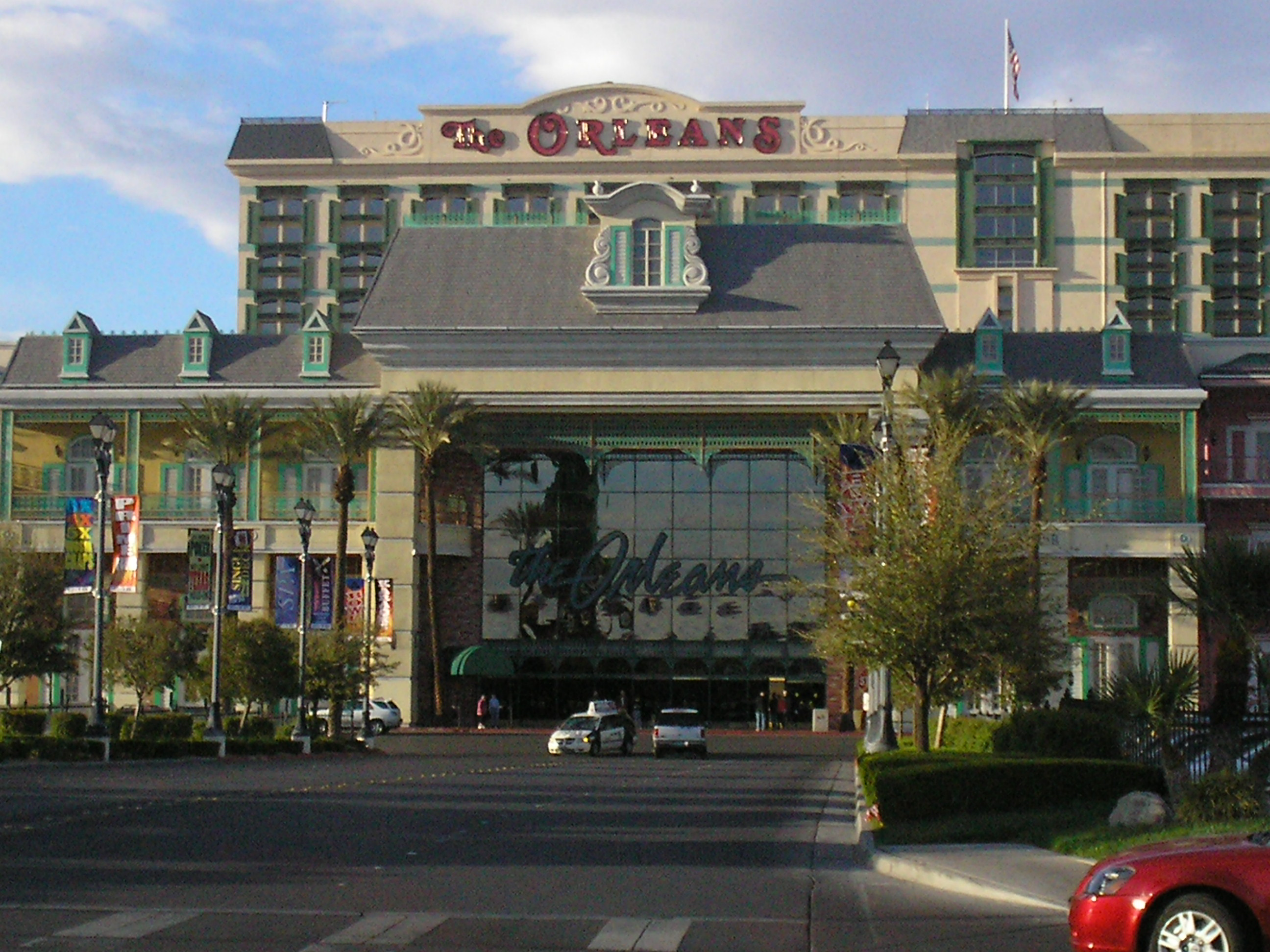
- Interactive map of The Orleans
- Location: Paradise, Nevada, U.S.; 4500 West Tropicana Avenue
- Opened: December 18, 1996; 29 years ago
- Theme: New Orleans
- No. of rooms: 1,886
- Gaming space: 135,000 sq ft (12,500 m^{2})
- Signature attractions: Orleans Bowling Center; Century Theatres; Orleans Arena; Orleans Showroom; Time Out Arcade
- Notable restaurants: Alder & Birch; Baskin-Robbins; Big Al's Oyster Bar; Copper Whisk Café; Fuddruckers; Ondori Asian Kitchen; Sbarro; Subway
- Casino type: Land-based
- Owner: Boyd Gaming
- Renovated in: 1999, 2003–04, 2015–16
- Website: Official website

The Orleans is a hotel and casino located in Paradise, Nevada, near the Las Vegas Strip. It is owned and operated by Boyd Gaming. It includes the large multipurpose Orleans Arena that can be converted into an ice rink and can seat 9,000 attendees. The Orleans Ice Rink is the former home of the Las Vegas Wranglers, a minor league ice hockey team that played in the ECHL from 2003 until 2014.

Though The Orleans attracts a fair number of tourists, particularly during the Mr. Olympia contest, it is primarily considered to be a locals casino. It is located about 0.8 miles (1.3 km) west of the Las Vegas Strip, but offers from 9:00 am to 12:30 am a free shuttle bus approximately every 30 minutes to sister property Gold Coast Hotel and Casino and The Linq.

== History ==
The $173 million Orleans opened on 88 acres of land on December 18, 1996, with 840 hotel rooms. When the Orleans first opened, it did not perform up to expectations. In 1999 a major addition to the casino and other amenities were added. The success of these changes has been demonstrated by continued expansions in later years.

The Orleans Arena was added in 2003. A second hotel tower was added in 2004.

The location has the distinction of having hosted the final concert performance from stand-up comedian George Carlin, on June 15, 2008.

== Attractions ==
Besides its casino and arena, The Orleans includes:

- Movie theater
- Bowling center with 52 lanes, a pro shop
- Spa
- Beauty salon
- Video game arcade
- Conference facilities

The Orleans includes a poker room with 34 tables and hosts both cash games and tournaments

== Notable performers ==
Musicians:

- Air Supply
- Akon
- Paul Anka
- David Archuleta
- Rodney Atkins
- Atlantic Starr
- Stevie B
- Babyface
- Bassnectar
- Dierks Bentley
- Big Bad Voodoo Daddy
- Clint Black
- The Black Eyed Peas
- Boyz II Men
- Brooks & Dunn
- David Cassidy
- The Charlie Daniels Band
- Judy Collins
- Alice Cooper
- Robert Cray
- Creedence Clearwater Revisited
- Burton Cummings
- Billy Ray Cyrus
- Daughtry
- Dennis DeYoung
- The Doobie Brothers
- Europe
- The Everly Brothers
- Don Felder
- Foghat
- Foreigner
- Four Tops
- Kenny G
- Gin Blossoms
- Lesley Gore
- Lee Greenwood
- Engelbert Humperdinck
- Ice Cube
- Etta James
- Wynonna Judd
- Kansas
- Evelyn 'Champagne' King
- KISS
- Gladys Knight
- Grand Funk Railroad
- Kool & the Gang
- Kris Kristofferson
- Jerry Lee Lewis
- Lifehouse
- The Little River Band
- Kenny Loggins
- Demi Lovato
- Patti LuPone
- The Manhattan Transfer
- The Marshall Tucker Band
- Richard Marx
- Don McLean
- Jo Dee Messina
- Midnight Star
- Eddie Money
- Naughty By Nature
- Vince Neil
- Newsboys
- Night Ranger
- Ted Nugent
- Daniel O'Donnell
- The Oak Ridge Boys
- Ohio Players
- Donny Osmond
- The Osmonds
- Panic! at the Disco
- Parliament Funkadelic
- Stephen Pearcy
- Peter, Paul & Mary
- Kellie Pickler
- Helen Reddy
- REO Speedwagon
- André Rieu
- The Righteous Brothers
- Rihanna
- LeAnn Rimes
- Kelly Rowland
- Leon Russell
- Neil Sedaka
- Kenny Wayne Shepherd
- Frank Sinatra, Jr.
- Dee Snider
- Trey Songz
- The SOS Band
- Rick Springfield
- Sugarhill Gang
- Styx
- The Temptations
- Three Dog Night
- TobyMac
- Tone Lōc
- Tower of Power
- Trans-Siberian Orchestra
- Travis Tritt
- Tanya Tucker
- Uncle Kracker
- Van Halen
- Deniece Williams
- Kip Winger
- Wisin & Yandel
- Lee Ann Womack
- Young MC

Comedians:

- Jim Belushi
- Bill Engvall
- George Carlin
- Dana Carvey
- Mike Epps
- Billy Gardell
- Frank Gorshin
- D. L. Hughley
- Larry the Cable Guy
- Vicki Lawrence
- Bill Maher
- Carlos Mencia
- Dennis Miller
- Tom Papa
- Don Rickles
- Bob Saget
- Sinbad
- The Smothers Brothers
- Lily Tomlin
- George Wallace
- Shawn & Marlon Wayans
- Steven Wright

Dancers/illusionists/other celebrities:

- Lance Burton
- Paul W Draper
- Mitzi Gaynor
- David Hasselhoff
- Jabbawockeez
