= Catherine LeFrançois =

Canadian bodybuilder (born 1971)

Cathy LeFrançois
- Professional bodybuilder
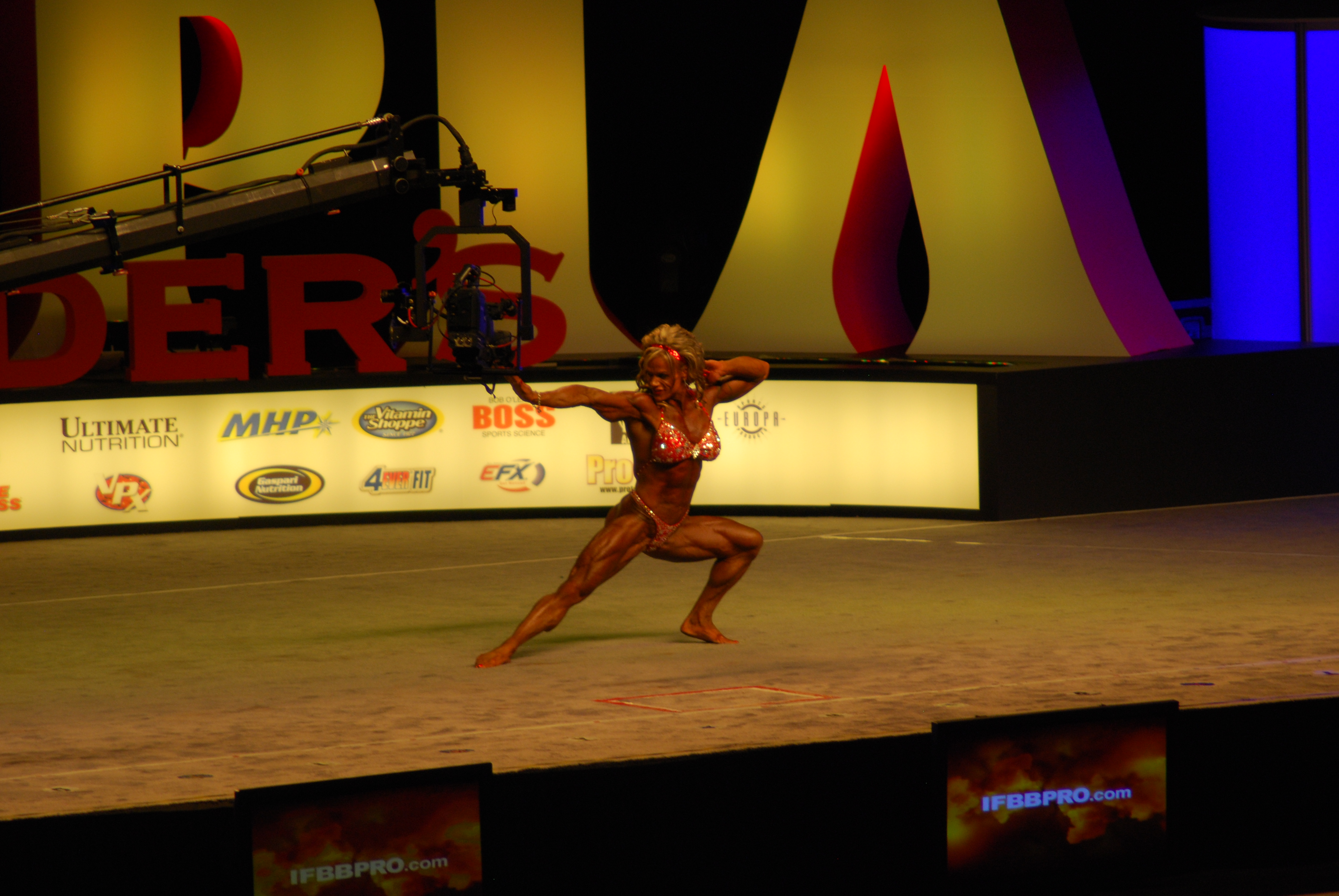
- Catherine LeFrançois posing on September 26, 2008, during the 2008 Ms. Olympia finals.

Personal info
- Born: February 12, 1971 (age 55); Amqui, Quebec, Canada

Best statistics
- Height: 5 ft 3 in (1.60 m)
- Weight: In season: 140 lb (64 kg); Off-season: 155 lb (70 kg)

Professional (Pro) career
- Pro-debut: IFBB Jan Tana Classic; 1995
- Best win: IFBB Ms. International lightweight champion; 2003
- Predecessor: Valentina Chepiga
- Successor: Dayana Cadeau
- Active: Since 1989; Retired 2006 (figure)

Catherine "Cathy" LeFrançois (formerly Priest), (born February 12, 1971) is a professional female bodybuilder and figure competitor from Canada. She was ranked as the 10th best female bodybuilder in the IFBB Pro Women's Bodybuilding Ranking List, as of 2013.

== Early life and education ==
Cathy LeFrançois was born on February 12, 1971, in Amqui, Quebec. She was adopted at the age of 4 and has two sisters, Nancy and Annie, and one brother, Joy-Yan. Her mother was a nurse and her dad was a school cook. They were both focused on working to build their retirement and provide for their children.

LeFrançois started figure skating at age six, but after two years she moved on to speed skating, alpine skiing, tennis, and badminton. She attended Notre-Dame-de-Foy in Quebec.

== Bodybuilding career ==
=== Amateur ===
When LeFrançois was 14 years old she noticed that a classmate, Steve Beaulieu, had big veiny forearms. She asked him how he got them. He said he was training at home with some dumbbells. After noticing her interest he brought her a magazine with Cory Everson on the cover. She immediately told him that she wanted to be like her. Later on she saw a guy, Rick Voyer, with huge legs and calves. She asked him how he got them. He said it was from speed skating, so she started speed skating and competed for many years. Her friend, Steve, always gives her motivation. At her first speed skating competition she won three gold medals. While looking for Steve at school a friend told her that he had been killed by a drunk driver. From that moment on, her entire career has been dedicated to him.

She won five medals in the Quebec provincial championships, an accomplishment that has not been equaled since. She earned her pro card in 1995 when she won the overall title at the CBBF Canada Cup.

=== Professional ===
==== 1995–2003 ====
LeFrançois made her pro debut at the 1995 Jan Tana Classic. In 1996, she retired from bodybuilding due to the politics of the sport. She returned to the sport in 1999. She competed exclusively as a lightweight once weight classes were introduced in pro shows in 2000. Her best achievement as a professional was winning the lightweight class at the 2003 Ms. International.

After 2003, she retired from bodybuilding and transitioned to figure competition, competing in her first figure contests in 2005.

==== 2006–present ====
In late 2006, she switched back to bodybuilding. She won the New York Pro in 2008, 2009, and 2010.

=== Contest history ===
- 1990 Québec Metropolitain regional amateur bodybuilding - 2nd
- 1991 CBBF Easter Canadian amateur bodybuilding championship - 1st (LW)
- 1993 CBBF Canadian amateur bodybuilding championship - 2nd (LW)
- 1994 CBBF Canadian amateur bodybuilding championship - 2nd (MW)
- 1995 CBBF Canada Cup III amateur bodybuilding championship - 1st (MW & overall)
- 1995 Jan Tana Classic - 12th
- 1996 Ms. International - 14th
- 1996 Jan Tana Classic - 8th
- 1999 Ms. International - 19th
- 1999 Jan Tana Classic - 8th
- 1999 IFBB Women's Extravaganza - 5th
- 2000 Ms. International - 3rd (LW)
- 2000 IFBB Ms. Olympia - 4th (LW)
- 2001 Ms. International - 4th (LW)
- 2002 Ms. International - 4th (LW)
- 2002 GNC Show of Strength - 2nd (LW)
- 2003 Ms. International - 1st (LW)
- 2003 IFBB Ms. Olympia - 4th (LW)
- 2006 IFBB Atlantic City Pro Women's Bodybuilding - 9th
- 2007 Ms. International - 10th
- 2007 Sacramento Pro - 2nd (LW)
- 2008 Ms. International - 6th
- 2008 New York Pro - 1st
- 2008 IFBB Olympia - 6th
- 2009 IFBB Ms. International - 8th
- 2009 IFBB New York Women's Pro - 1st
- 2010 IFBB New York Pro Bodybuilding & Bikini Championships - 1st
- 2010 NPC Nevada State Championships - NP
- 2010 IFBB Pro Bodybuilding Weekly Championships - 3rd
- 2010 IFBB Europa Battle of Champions - 3rd
- 2010 IFBB Olympia - 7th
- 2011 IFBB Ms. International - 6th
- 2011 IFBB FIBO Power Pro Germany - NP
- 2011 IFBB Toronto Pro Super Show - 4th
- 2011 IFBB Pro Bodybuilding Weekly Championships - 1st
- 2011 IFBB Olympia- 13th
- 2012 IFBB Ms. International - 4th
- 2012 IFBB Toronto Pro Supershow - 7th
- 2013 IFBB Ms. International - 5th
- 2013 IFBB Ms. Olympia - 10th
- 2016 IFBB Toronto Pro Supershow - 3rd

== Figure career ==
=== Contest history ===
- 2005 IFBB Europa Supershow - DNP
- 2005 Sacramento Pro Figure - DNP
- 2006 IFBB California Pro Figure - 12th

== Personal life ==
LeFrançois was married to bodybuilder Lee Priest on July 1, 2000; they separated in 2005. She currently lives in El Monte, California. She is a French Canadian.

Ms. International
| Preceded by: Valentina Chepiga | First (2003) | Succeeded by: Dayana Cadeau |
