= 2007 Ms. Olympia =

Women's professional bodybuilding competition

- Promotion: IFBB
- Date: September 27, 2007
- Venue: South Hall in the Las Vegas Convention Center and Orleans Arena at The Orleans Hotel and Casino
- City: Winchester and Paradise, Nevada, United States

Event chronology
2006 Ms. Olympia	2007 Ms. Olympia	2008 Ms. Olympia

The 2007 Ms. Olympia contest is an IFBB professional bodybuilding competition and part of Joe Weider's Olympia Fitness & Performance Weekend 2007 was held on September 27, 2007, at the South Hall in the Las Vegas Convention Center in Winchester, Nevada and in the Orleans Arena at The Orleans Hotel and Casino in Paradise, Nevada. It was the 28th Ms. Olympia competition held. Other events at the exhibition include the Mr. Olympia, Fitness Olympia, and Figure Olympia contests.

== Prize money ==
- 1st – $30,000
- 2nd – $18,000
- 3rd – $10,000
- 4th – $7,000
- 5th – $4,000
- 6th – $2,000

Total: $71,000

== Rounds ==
- Round 1 + Round 2 (Symmetry and Muscularity/Conditioning Rounds): Judges evaluated balance, proportion, muscle size, and definition.
- Round 3 (Compulsory Poses Round): Contestants performed mandatory poses to highlight specific muscle groups.
- Round 4 (Posedown Round): Contestants presented a choreographed routine, showcasing their physique, creativity, and presentation.

== Results ==
- 1st – Iris Kyle
- 2nd – Dayana Cadeau
- 3rd – Yaxeni Oriquen-Garcia
- 4th – Lisa Aukland
- 5th – Heather Armbrust
- 6th – Betty Pariso
- 7th – Bonnie Priest
- 8th – Nicole Ball
- 9th – Sarah Dunlap
- 10th – Annie Rivieccio
- 11th – Valentina Chepiga
- 12th – Tazzie Colomb
- 13th – Mah-Ann Mendoza
- 14th – Stephanie Kessler
- 15th – Antoinette Norman

Comparison to previous Olympia results:

- Same – Iris Kyle
- Same – Dayana Cadeau
- +4 – Yaxeni Oriquen-Garcia
- +1 – Lisa Aukland
- Same – Betty Pariso
- -3 – Bonnie Priest
- -7 – Annie Rivieccio
- -3 – Valentina Chepiga
- +1 – Tazzie Colomb
- -2 – Mah-Ann Mendoza
- -5 – Antoinette Norman

=== Scorecard ===
No	NAME	COUNTRY	RD1 + RD2	RD3	RD4	TOTAL	PLACE
1	Heather ARMBRUST [Policky] *	USA	54	28	24	106	5
2	Lisa AUKLAND *	USA	30	20	20	70	4
3	Nicole BALL	Canada	86	44		130	8
4	Dayana CADEAU *	Canada	20	12	10	42	2
5	Valentina CHEPIGA	Ukraine	110	52		162	11
6	Tazzie COLOMB	USA	128	66		194	12
7	Sarah DUNLAP	USA	88	46		134	9
8	Stephanie KESSLER	USA	136	65		201	14
9	Iris KYLE *	USA	10	5	5	20	1
10	Mah-Ann MENDOZA	USA	132	63		195	13
11	Yaxeni ORIQUEN-GARCIA *	Venezuela	40	12	16	68	3
12	Betty PARISO *	USA	62	31	30	123	6
13	Bonny PRIEST	USA	70	32		102	7
14	Annie RIVIECCIO	USA	98	48		146	10
15	Antoinette THOMPSON [Norman]	USA	144	73		217	15
*Qualifies for the 2008 Ms. Olympia

== Attended ==
- 10th Ms. Olympia attended – Yaxeni Oriquen-Garcia
- 9th Ms. Olympia attended – Iris Kyle
- 8th Ms. Olympia attended – Dayana Cadeau, and Valentina Chepiga
- 7th Ms. Olympia attended – Betty Pariso
- 4th Ms. Olympia attended – Tazzie Colomb and Bonnie Priest
- 3rd Ms. Olympia attended – Lisa Aukland, Mah-Ann Mendoza, and Annie Rivieccio
- 2nd Ms. Olympia attended – Antoinette Norman
- 1st Ms. Olympia attended – Heather Armbrust, Nicole Ball, Sarah Dunlap, Stephanie Kessler
- Previous year Olympia attendees who did not attend – Helen Bouchard, Heather Foster, Jitka Harazimova, Gayle Moher Colette Nelson, Brenda Raganot, Dena Westerfield

== Notable events ==
- This was Iris Kyle's 3rd overall Olympia win.

== 2007 Ms. Olympia Qualified ==
#	Name	Country	How Qualified
1	Iris Kyle	(United States)	2006 Ms. Olympia 1st place
2	Dayana Cadeau	(Canada)	2006 Ms. Olympia 2nd place
3	Annie Rivieccio	(United States)	2006 Ms. Olympia 3rd place
4	Bonny Priest	(United States)	2006 Ms. Olympia 4th place
5	Lisa Aukland	(United States)	2006 Ms. Olympia 5th place
6	Betty Pariso	(United States)	2006 Ms. Olympia 6th place
7	Heather Armbrust	(United States)	2007 Sacramento Pro HW 1st
8	Antoinette Norman	(United States)	2007 Sacramento Pro LW 1st
9	Yaxeni Oriquen-Garcia	(Venezuela)	2007 Ms. International 2nd
10	Stephanie Kessler	(United States)	2007 Jan Tana Pro HW 1st
11	Sarah Dunlap	(United States)	2007 Jan Tana Pro LW 1st
12	Mah-Ann Mendoza	(Philippines)	2007 Europa Super Show LW 1st
13	Tazzie Colomb	(United States)	2007 Europa Super Show HW 1st
14	Valentina Chepiga	(Ukraine)	Competing as a past champion
15	Nicole Ball	(United States)	2007 Atlantic City LW 1st

== Pictures ==
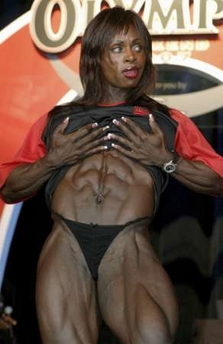

== See also ==
- 2007 Mr. Olympia
