= 2006 Ms. Olympia =

Women's professional bodybuilding competition

- Promotion: IFBB
- Date: September 29, 2006
- Venue: South Hall in the Las Vegas Convention Center and Orleans Arena at The Orleans Hotel and Casino
- City: Winchester and Paradise, Nevada, United States

Event chronology
| 2005 Ms. Olympia | 2006 Ms. Olympia | 2007 Ms. Olympia |

The 2006 Ms. Olympia contest is an IFBB professional bodybuilding competition and part of Joe Weider's Olympia Fitness & Performance Weekend 2006 that was held on September 29, 2006, at the South Hall in the Las Vegas Convention Center in Winchester, Nevada, and in the Orleans Arena at The Orleans Hotel and Casino in Paradise, Nevada. It was the 27th Ms. Olympia competition held. Other events at the exhibition include the Mr. Olympia, Fitness Olympia, and Figure Olympia contests.

== Prize money ==
- 1st - $30,000
- 2nd - $18,000
- 3rd - $10,000
- 4th - $7,000
- 5th - $4,000
- 6th - $2,000

Total: $71,000

== Rounds ==
- Round 1 + Round 2 (Symmetry and Muscularity/Conditioning Rounds): Assess the balance, proportion, muscle size, and definition of the contestants.
- Round 3 (Compulsory Poses Round): Contestants performed mandatory poses to highlight specific muscle groups.
- Round 4 (Posedown Round): Contestants presented a choreographed routine, showcasing their physique, creativity, and presentation skills.

== Numerical order of contestants ==
| No | NAME | COUNTRY |
|---|---|---|
| 1 | Lisa Aukland | USA |
| 2 | Helen Bouchard | Canada |
| 3 | Dayana Cadeau | Canada |
| 4 | Tazzie Colomb | USA |
| 5 | Heather Foster | USA |
| 6 | Jitka Harazimova | Czech Republic |
| 7 | Iris Kyle | USA |
| 8 | Gayle Moher | USA |
| 9 | Colette Nelson | USA |
| 10 | Yaxeni Oriquen-Garcia | Venezuela |
| 11 | Betty Pariso | USA |
| 12 | Bonny Priest | USA |
| 13 | Brenda Raganot | USA |
| 14 | Annie Rivieccio | USA |
| 15 | Dena Westerfield | USA |

== Results ==
=== Scorecard ===
| NAME | COUNTRY | RD1+RD2 | RD3 | RD4 | TOTAL | PLACE |
|---|---|---|---|---|---|---|
| Iris KYLE* | USA | 10 | 5 | 23 | 38 | 1 |
| Dayana CADEAU* | Canada | 20 | 10 | 10 | 40 | 2 |
| Annie RIVIECCIO* | USA | 32 | 15 | 5 | 52 | 3 |
| Bonny PRIEST* | USA | 42 | 20 | 28 | 90 | 4 |
| Lisa AUKLAND* | USA | 44 | 25 | 23 | 92 | 5 |
| Betty PARISO* | USA | 54 | 28 | 15 | 97 | 6 |
| Yaxeni ORIQUEN-GARCIA | Venezuela | 74 | 36 | | 110 | 7 |
| Helen BOUCHARD | Canada | 76 | 40 | | 116 | 8 |
| Gayle MOHER | USA | 90 | 47 | | 137 | 9 |
| Jitka HARAZIMOVA | Czech Republic | 106 | 59 | | 165 | 10 |
| Tazzie COLOMB | USA | 108 | 59 | | 167 | 11 |
| Heather FOSTER | USA | 118 | 54 | | 172 | 12 |
| Colette NELSON | USA | 130 | 54 | | 184 | 13 |
| Dena WESTERFIELD | USA | 140 | 70 | | 210 | 14 |
| Brenda RAGANOT | USA | 150 | 75 | | 225 | 15 |
*Qualifies for the 2007 Ms. Olympia

Comparison to previous Olympia results:

- +1 - Iris Kyle
- +1 - Dayana Cadeau
- +10 - Annie Rivieccio
- +2 - Bonnie Priest
- +1 - Lisa Aukland
- +2 - Betty Pariso
- -6 - Yaxeni Oriquen-Garcia
- -4 - Gayle Moher
- -6 - Jitka Harazimova
- -5 - Tazzie Colomb
- -5 - Heather Foster
- -10 - Brenda Raganot

== Attended ==
- 9th Ms. Olympia attended - Yaxeni Oriquen-Garcia
- 8th Ms. Olympia attended - Iris Kyle
- 7th Ms. Olympia attended - Dayana Cadeau
- 6th Ms. Olympia attended - Betty Pariso
- 5th Ms. Olympia attended - Gayle Moher and Brenda Raganot
- 4th Ms. Olympia attended - Jitka Harazimova
- 3rd Ms. Olympia attended - Tazzie Colomb and Bonnie Priest
- 2nd Ms. Olympia attended - Heather Foster, and Annie Rivieccio
- 1st Ms. Olympia attended - Helen Bouchard, Colette Nelson, and Dena Westerfield
- Previous year Olympia attendees who did not attend - Mah-Ann Mendoza, Desiree Ellis, Rosemary Jennings, Marja Lehtonen, Antoinette Norman, Betty Viana-Adkins, and Tonia Williams

== Notable events ==
- Iris Kyle reclaimed her throne this year after Yaxeni Oriquen-Garcia dethroned her of the Olympia title last year.
  - Iris won by a score of 38 to Dayana Cadeau's score of 40, making this was the closest overall Ms. Olympia title Iris ever won. She received perfect scores in rounds 1+2 and 3, but received 23 points during round 4.
- Iris Kyle weighed 162 lb (73 kg).
- Valentina Chepiga qualified for the 2006 Ms. Olympia but did not attend.

== 2006 Ms. Olympia Qualified ==
| # | Name | Country | How Qualified |
|---|---|---|---|
| 1 | Yaxeni Oriquen-Garcia | (Venezuela) | 2005 Ms. Olympia 1st place |
| 2 | Iris Kyle | (United States) | 2005 Ms. Olympia 2nd place |
| 3 | Dayana Cadeau | (Canada) | 2005 Ms. Olympia 3rd place |
| 4 | Jitka Harazimova | (Czech Republic) | 2005 Ms. Olympia 4th place |
| 5 | Brenda Raganot | (United States) | 2005 Ms. Olympia 5th place |
| 6 | Bonny Priest | (United States) | 2005 Ms. Olympia 6th place |
| 7 | Betty Pariso | (United States) | 2006 Ms. International 5th place |
| 8 | Annie Rivieccio | (United States) | 2006 Ms. International 7th place |
| 9 | Lisa Aukland | (United States) | 2006 Ms. International 8th place |
| 10 | Heather Foster | (United States) | 2006 Europa Super Show 1st |
| 11 | Dena Westerfield | (United States) | 2006 Europa Super Show 2nd |
| 12 | Colette Nelson | (United States) | 2006 Europa Super Show 3rd |
| 13 | Helen Bouchard | (Canada) | 2006 Atlantic City 2nd place |
| 14 | Tazzie Colomb | (United States) | 2006 Atlantic City 3rd place |
| 15 | Gayle Moher | (United Kingdom) | 2006 Atlantic City 4th place |

== See also ==
- 2006 Mr. Olympia
