= 2005 Ms. Olympia =

Women's professional bodybuilding competition

- Promotion: IFBB
- Date: October 14-15, 2005
- Venue: South Hall in the Las Vegas Convention Center and Orleans Arena at The Orleans Hotel and Casino
- City: Winchester and Paradise, Nevada, United States

Event chronology
2004 Ms. Olympia	2005 Ms. Olympia	2006 Ms. Olympia

The 2005 Ms. Olympia contest is an IFBB professional bodybuilding competition and part of Joe Weider's Olympia Fitness & Performance Weekend 2005 was held on October 14-15, 2005, at the South Hall in the Las Vegas Convention Center in Winchester, Nevada and in the Orleans Arena at The Orleans Hotel and Casino in Paradise, Nevada. It was the 26th Ms. Olympia competition held. Other events at the exhibition include the Mr. Olympia, Fitness Olympia, Figure Olympia, and Olympia Wildcard contests.

== Prize money ==
- 1st - $30,000
- 2nd - $18,000
- 3rd - $10,000
- 4th - $7,000
- 5th - $4,000
- 6th - $2,000

Total: $71,000

== Rounds ==
- Round 1 (Symmetry Round): Evaluating the overall balance and proportion of the contestants' physiques.
- Round 2 (Muscularity/Conditioning Round): Focusing on muscle size, definition, and conditioning, with attention to muscle separation and leanness.
- Round 3 (Compulsory Poses Round): Contestants performed mandatory poses to highlight specific muscle groups.
- Round 4 (Posedown Round): A choreographed routine to music, allowing contestants to showcase their creativity, presentation, and overall stage presence.

== Competitors' weight ==
- Yaxeni Oriquen-Garcia - 173 lb (78 kg)
- Betty Pariso - 164 lb (74 kg)
- Betty Viana-Adkins - 160 lb (73 kg)
- Annie Rivieccio - 160 lb (73 kg)
- Bonny Priest - 158 lb (72 kg)
- Iris Kyle - 157 lb (71 kg)
- Jitka Harazimova - 145 lb (66 kg)
- Mah-Ann Mendoza - 141 lb (64 kg)
- Brenda Raganot - 140 lb (64 kg)
- Dayana Cadeau - 138 lb (63 kg)
- Marja Lehtonen - 135 lb (61 kg)
- Toni Norman - 135 lb (61 kg)
- Desiree Ellis - 133 lb (60 kg)
- Tonia Williams - 132 lb (60 kg)
- Rosemary Jennings - 128 lb (58 kg)

== Numerical order of contestants ==
No	NAME	COUNTRY
1	Dayana Cadeau	Canada
2	Desiree Ellis	Canada
3	Jitka Harazimova	Czech Republic
4	Rosemary Jennings	USA
5	Iris Kyle	USA
6	Marja Lehtonen	Finland
7	Mah-Ann Mandoza	USA
8	Antoinette Norman	USA
9	Yaxeni Oriquen	Venezuela
10	Betty Pariso	USA
11	Bonny Priest	USA
12	Brenda Raganot	USA
13	Annie Rivieccio	USA
14	Betty Viana	Venezuela
15	Tonia Williams	USA

== Results ==
=== Scorecard ===
Place	Name	Country	RD1	RD2	RD3	RD4	Total
1	Yaxeni Oriquen	Venezuela	5	6	5	5	21
2	Iris Kyle	USA	11	11	10	10	42
3	Dayana Cadeau	Canada	22	14	15	15	66
4	Jitka Harazimova	Czech Republic	15	20	21	22	78
5	Brenda Raganot	USA	22	29	27	22	100
6	Bonny Priest	USA	33	45	34	-	112
7	Betty Viana	Venezuela	38	35	40	-	113
8	Betty Pariso	USA	41	36	46	-	123
9	Rosemary Jennings	USA	50	34	50	-	134
10	Antoinette Norman	USA	39	55	41	-	135
11	Mah-Ann Mandoza	USA	57	53	61	-	171
12	Tonia Williams	USA	59	63	61	-	183
13	Annie Rivieccio	USA	66	63	56	-	185
14	Marja Lehtonen	Finland	70	65	67	-	202
15	Desiree Ellis	Canada	71	75	70	-	216

Comparison to previous Olympia results:

- +2 - Yaxeni Oriquen-Garcia
- -1 - Iris Kyle
- -2 - Dayana Cadeau
- -6 - Jitka Harazimova
- -1 - Brenda Ragonot
- +1 - Bonny Priest
- -2 - Betty Viana-Adkins
- -4 - Betty Pariso
- -1 - Rosemary Jennings
- -6 - Rosemary Jennings
- -5 - Mah-Ann Mendoza
- -10 - Desiree Ellis

== Attended ==
- 8th Ms. Olympia attended - Yaxeni Oriquen-Garcia
- 7th Ms. Olympia attended - Iris Kyle
- 6th Ms. Olympia attended - Dayana Cadeau
- 5th Ms. Olympia attended - Betty Pariso
- 4th Ms. Olympia attended - Brenda Ragonot and Betty Viana-Adkins
- 3rd Ms. Olympia attended - Jitka Harazimova
- 2nd Ms. Olympia attended - Desiree Ellis, Rosemary Jennings, Marja Lehtonen, Mah-Ann Mendoza, and Bonnie Priest
- 1st Ms. Olympia attended - Antionette Norman, Annie Rivieccio, and Tonia Williams
- Previous year Olympia attendees who did not attend - Lisa Aukland, Vilma Caez, Valentina Chepiga, Nancy Lewis, Joanna Thomas

== Notable events ==
=== 2005 Ms. Olympia changes ===
The IFBB introduced the so-called '20 percent rule', requesting "that female athletes in Bodybuilding, Fitness and Figure decrease the amount of muscularity by a factor of 20%". The memo stated that the request "applies to those female athletes whose physiques require the decrease". Another change added to the 2005 Ms. Olympia, was the abandonment of the weight class system adopted in 2000. In 2005 Ms. Olympia, Iris Kyle was dethroned by Yaxeni Oriquen-Garcia.

== 2005 Ms. Olympia Qualified ==
#	Name	Country	How Qualified
1	Iris Kyle	(United States)	2004 Ms. Olympia HW 1st
2	Lenda Murray	(United States)	2004 Ms. Olympia HW 2nd
3	Yaxeni Oriquen-Garcia	(Venezuela)	2004 Ms. Olympia HW 3rd
4	Dayana Cadeau	(Canada)	2004 Ms. Olympia LW 1st
5	Denise Masino	(United States)	2004 Ms. Olympia LW 2nd
6	Marja Lehtonen	(Finland)	2004 Ms. Olympia LW 3rd
7	Betty Viana-Adkins	(Venezuela)	2005 Ms. International HW 2nd
8	Betty Pariso	(United States)	2005 Ms. International HW 3rd
9	Brenda Raganot	(United States)	2005 Ms. International LW 1st
10	Mah-Ann Mendoza	(Philippines)	2005 Ms. International LW 2nd
11	Desiree Ellis	(Canada)	2005 Ms. International LW 3rd
12	Annie Rivieccio	(United States)	2005 New York Pro HW 1st
13	Rosemary Jennings	(United States)	2005 New York Pro LW 1st
14	Bonny Priest	(United States)	2005 Southwest Supershow HW 1st
15	Tonia Williams	(United States)	2005 Southwest Supershow LW 1st
16	Antoinette Norman	(United States)	2005 Charlotte Pro LW 1st
17	Jitka Harazimova	(Czech Republic)	2005 Charlotte Pro HW 1st

== See also ==
- 2005 Mr. Olympia
