= 2008 Ms. Olympia =

Women's professional bodybuilding competition

- Promotion: IFBB
- Date: September 26, 2008
- Venue: South Hall in the Las Vegas Convention Center and Orleans Arena at The Orleans Hotel and Casino
- City: Winchester and Paradise, Nevada, United States

Event chronology
| 2007 Ms. Olympia | 2008 Ms. Olympia | 2009 Ms. Olympia |

The 2008 Ms. Olympia contest is an IFBB professional bodybuilding competition and part of Joe Weider's Olympia Fitness & Performance Weekend 2008 was held on September 26, 2008, at the South Hall in the Las Vegas Convention Center in Winchester, Nevada and in the Orleans Arena at The Orleans Hotel and Casino in Paradise, Nevada. It was the 29th Ms. Olympia competition held. Other events at the exhibition include the 212 Olympia Showdown, Mr. Olympia, Fitness Olympia, and Figure Olympia contests.

== Prize money ==
- 1st - $30,000
- 2nd - $18,000
- 3rd - $10,000
- 4th - $7,000
- 5th - $4,000
- 6th - $2,000

Total: $71,000

== Rounds ==
- Round 1 + Round 2 (Symmetry and Muscularity/Conditioning Rounds): Judges assessed the competitors' balance, proportion, muscle size, and definition.
- Round 3 (Compulsory Poses Round): Contestants performed mandatory poses to showcase their physiques uniformly.
- Round 4 (Posedown Round): Contestants presented a choreographed routine to music, emphasizing their presentation, creativity, and stage presence.

== Results ==
- 1st - Iris Kyle
- 2nd - Betty Viana-Adkins
- 3rd - Yaxeni Oriquen-Garcia
- 4th - Lisa Aukland
- 5th - Dayana Cadeau
- 6th - Cathy LeFrançois
- 7th - Betty Pariso
- 8th - Mah-Ann Mendoza
- 9th - Jeannie Paparone
- 10th - Jennifer Sedia
- 11th - Nicole Ball
- 12th - Brenda Raganot
- 13th - Debbie Bramwell
- 14th - Heather Armbrust
- 15th - Rosemary Jennings
- 16th - Sherry Smith
- 17th - Klaudia Larson

Comparison to previous Olympia results:

- Same - Iris Kyle
- +5 - Betty Viana-Adkins
- Same - Yaxeni Oriquen-Garcia
- Same - Lisa Aukland
- -3 - Dayana Cadeau
- -2 - Cathy LeFrançois
- -1 - Betty Pariso
- +5 - Mah-Ann Mendoza
- -2 - Nicole Ball
- +3 - Brenda Raganot
- -9 - Heather Armbrust
- Same - Rosemary Jennings

=== Scorecard ===
| No | NAME | COUNTRY | RD1 + RD2 | RD3 | RD4 | TOTAL | PLACE |
|---|---|---|---|---|---|---|---|
| 1 | Betty VIANA-ADKINS | Venezuela | 32 | 11 | 19 | 62 | 2 |
| 2 | Heather ARMBRUST | USA | 132 | 58 | | 190 | 14 |
| 3 | Lisa AUKLAND | USA | 36 | 18 | 18 | 72 | 4 |
| 4 | Nichole BALL | Canada | 110 | 58 | | 168 | 11 |
| 5 | Deborah BRAMWELL | USA | 118 | 68 | | 186 | 13 |
| 6 | Dayana CADEAU | USA | 32 | 21 | 21 | 74 | 5 |
| 7 | Rosemary JENNINGS | USA | 148 | 72 | | 220 | 15 |
| 8 | Iris KYLE | USA | 10 | 5 | 5 | 20 | 1 |
| 9 | Klaudia LARSON | Sweden | 160 | 80 | | 240 | 17 |
| 10 | Cathy LeFRANCOIS | Canada | 60 | 31 | 30 | 121 | 6 |
| 11 | Mah-Ann MENDOZA | USA | 84 | 41 | | 125 | 8 |
| 12 | Yaxeni ORIQUEN-GARCIA | Venezuela | 36 | 19 | 16 | 71 | 3 |
| 13 | Jeannie PAPARONE | USA | 88 | 45 | | 133 | 9 |
| 14 | Betty PARISO | USA | 70 | 35 | | 105 | 7 |
| 15 | Brenda RAGANOT | USA | 122 | 58 | | 180 | 12 |
| 16 | Jennifer SEDIA | USA | 102 | 53 | | 180 | 10 |
| 17 | Sherry SMITH | USA | 46 | 77 | | 223 | 16 |

*Top 6 finalists qualify for the 2009 Ms. Olympia

== Attended ==
- 11th Ms. Olympia attended - Yaxeni Oriquen-Garcia
- 10th Ms. Olympia attended - Iris Kyle
- 9th Ms. Olympia attended - Dayana Cadeau
- 7th Ms. Olympia attended - Betty Pariso
- 4th Ms. Olympia attended - Lisa Aukland and Mah-Ann Mendoza
- 3rd Ms. Olympia attended - Betty Viana-Adkins, Brenda Raganot, and Rosemary Jennings
- 2nd Ms. Olympia attended - Heather Armbrust, Cathy LeFrançois, and Nicole Ball
- 1st Ms. Olympia attended - Debbie Bramwell, Jeannie Paparone, Jennifer Sedia, Sherry Smith, and Klaudia Larson
- Previous year Olympia attendees who did not attend - Antoinette Norman, Stephanie Kessler, Tazzie Colomb, Valentina Chepiga, Annie Rivieccio, Sarah Dunlap, and Bonnie Priest

== Notable events ==
- This was Iris Kyle's 4th overall Olympia win and thus tied her with Kim Chizevsky-Nicholls with the number of overall Olympia wins.
- Betty Viana-Adkins placed 2nd this Olympia, the best placing she has ever had at the Olympia.

== 2008 Ms. Olympia Qualified ==
| # | Name | Country | How Qualified |
|---|---|---|---|
| 1 | Iris Kyle | (United States) | 2007 Ms. Olympia 1st place |
| 2 | Dayana Cadeau | (Canada) | 2007 Ms. Olympia 2nd place |
| 3 | Yaxeni Oriquen-Garcia | (Venezuela) | 2007 Ms. Olympia 3rd place |
| 4 | Lisa Aukland | (United States) | 2007 Ms. Olympia 4th place |
| 5 | Heather Armbrust | (United States) | 2007 Ms. Olympia 5th place |
| 6 | Betty Pariso | (United States) | 2007 Ms. Olympia 6th place |
| 7 | Brenda Raganot | (United States) | 2008 Ms. International 5th |
| 8 | Cathy LeFrancois | (Canada) | 2008 Ms. International 6th |
| 9 | Jeannie Paparone | (United States) | 2008 New York Pro 2nd |
| 10 | Rosemary Jennings | (United States) | 2008 New York Pro 3rd |
| 11 | Nicole Ball | (Canada) | 2008 Tampa Pro 1st |
| 12 | Klaudia Larson | (Sweden) | 2008 Tampa Pro 2nd |
| 13 | Debbie Bramwell | (United States) | 2008 Tampa Pro 3rd |
| 14 | Jennifer Sedia | (United States) | 2008 Europa Pro LW |
| 15 | Sherry Smith | (United States) | 2008 Europa Pro HW |
| 16 | Mah-Ann Mendoza | (Philippines) | 2008 Atlantic City Pro 2nd |
| 17 | Betty Viana-Adkins | (Venezuela) | 2008 Atlantic City Pro 3rd |

== Pictures ==
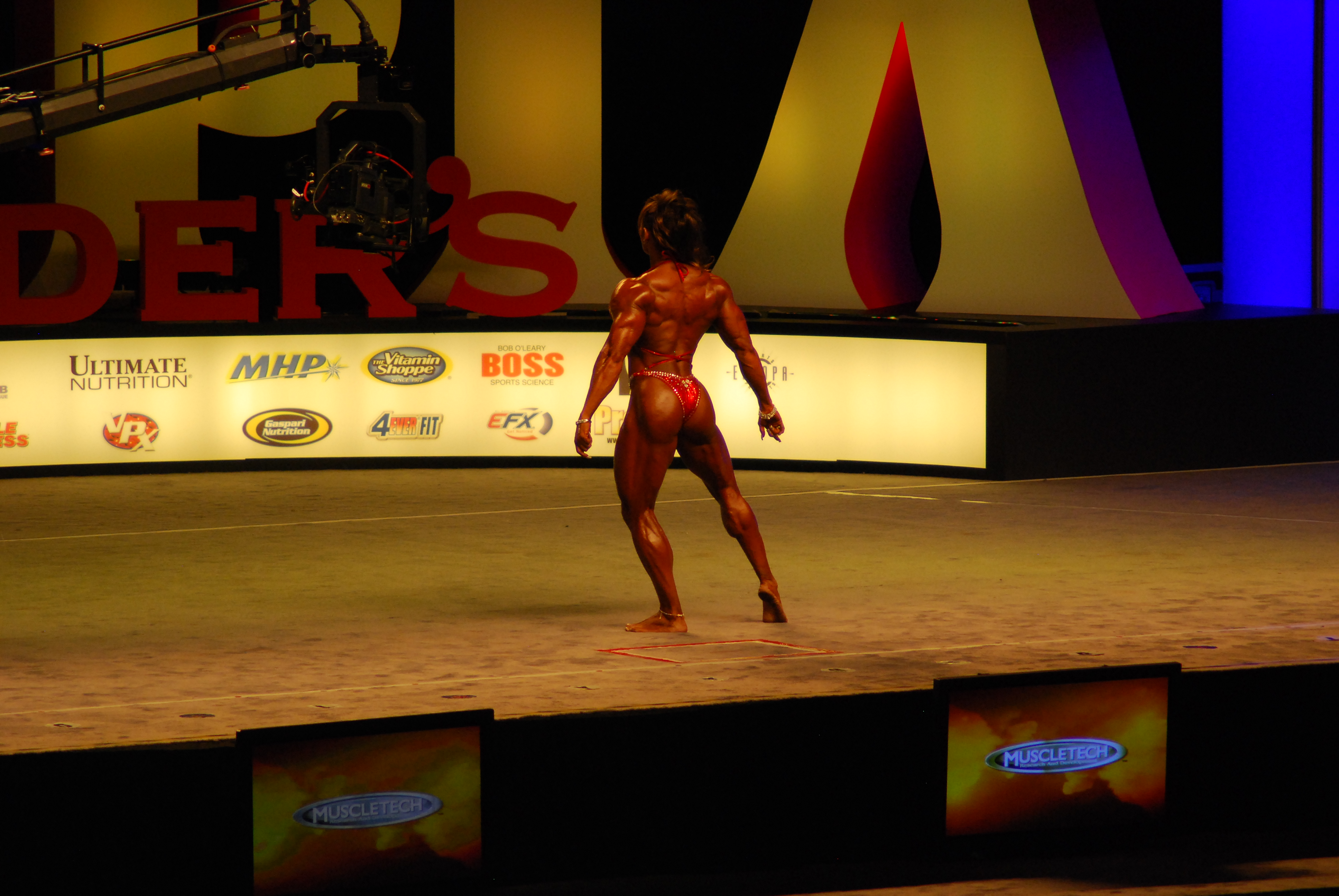

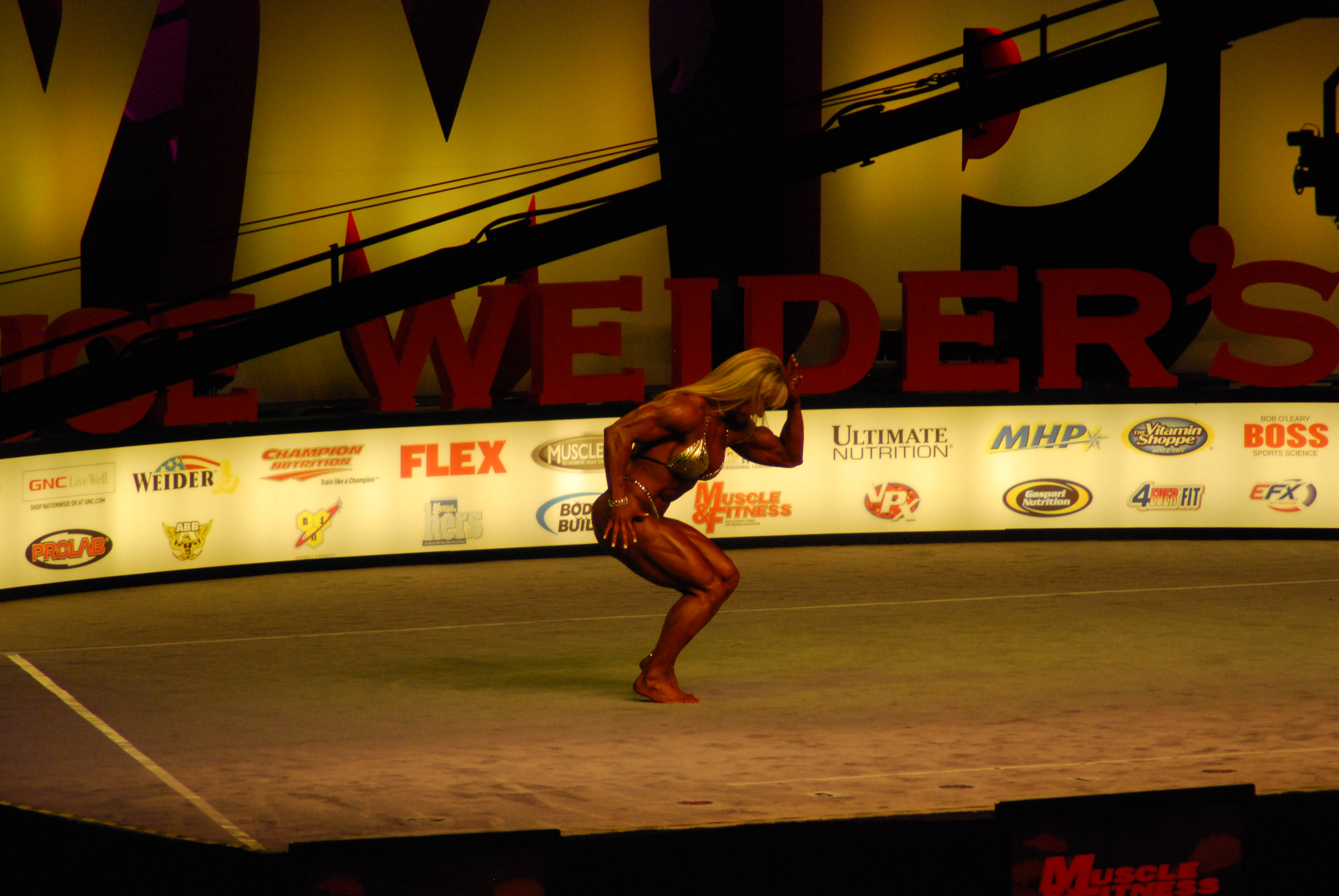

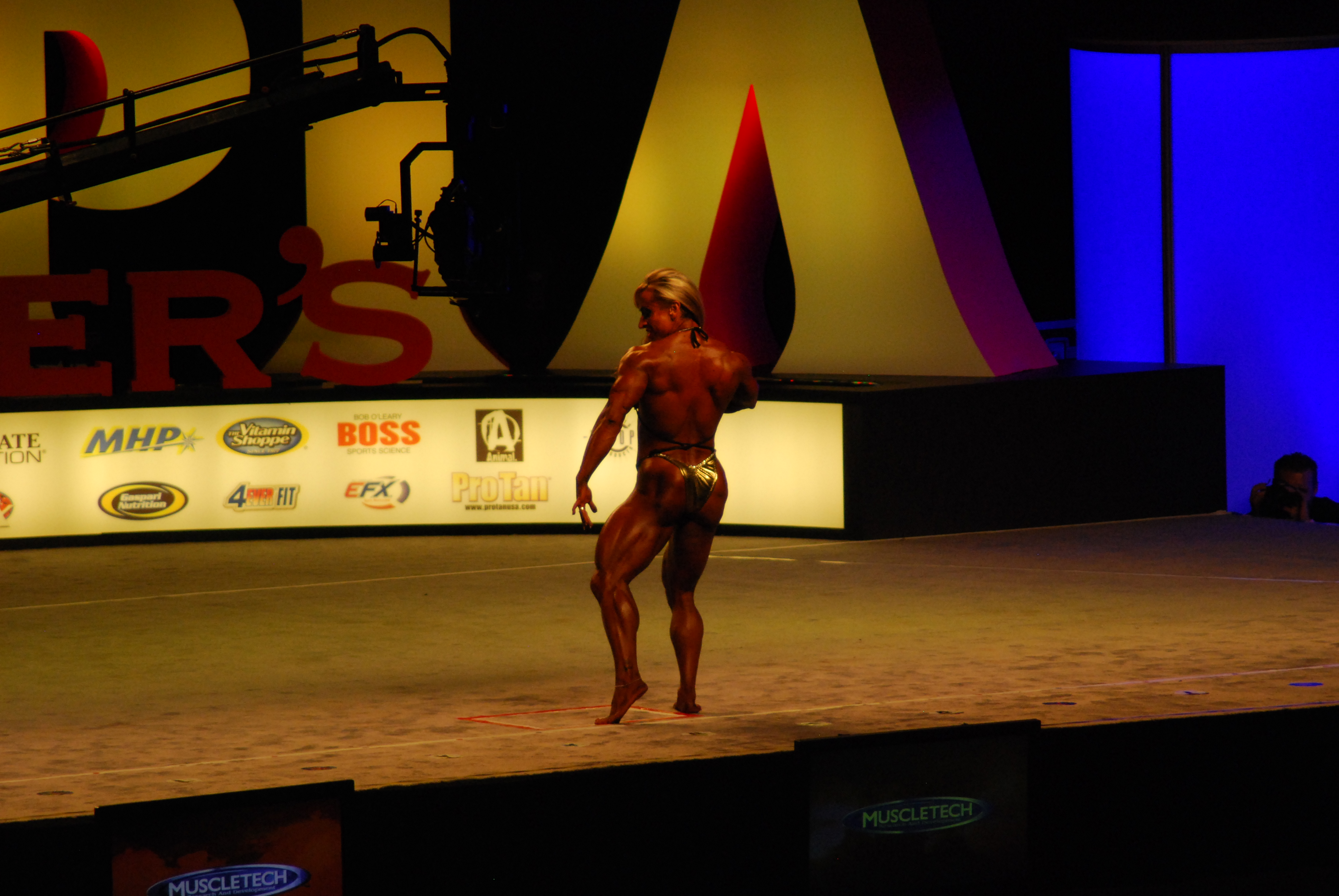

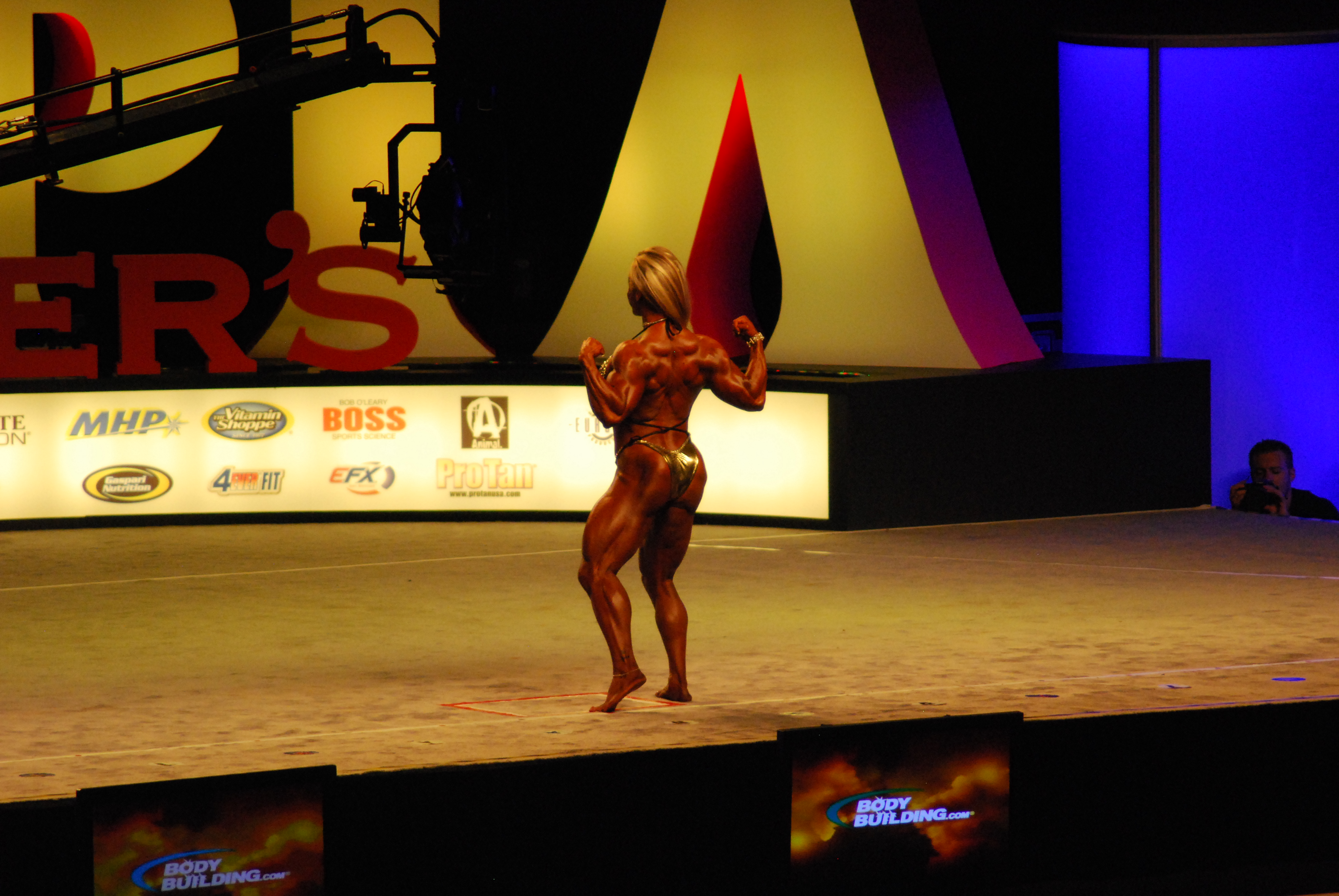

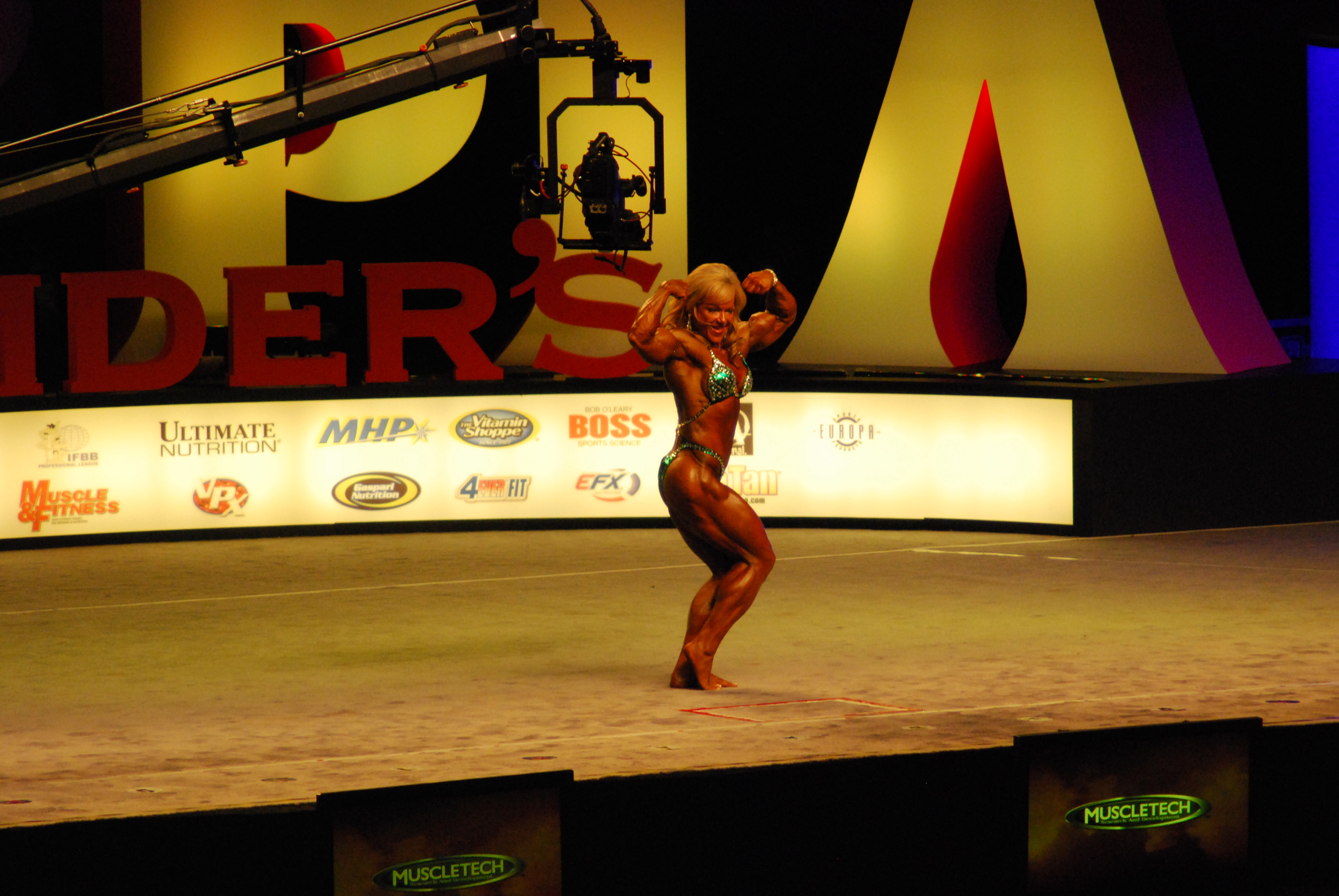

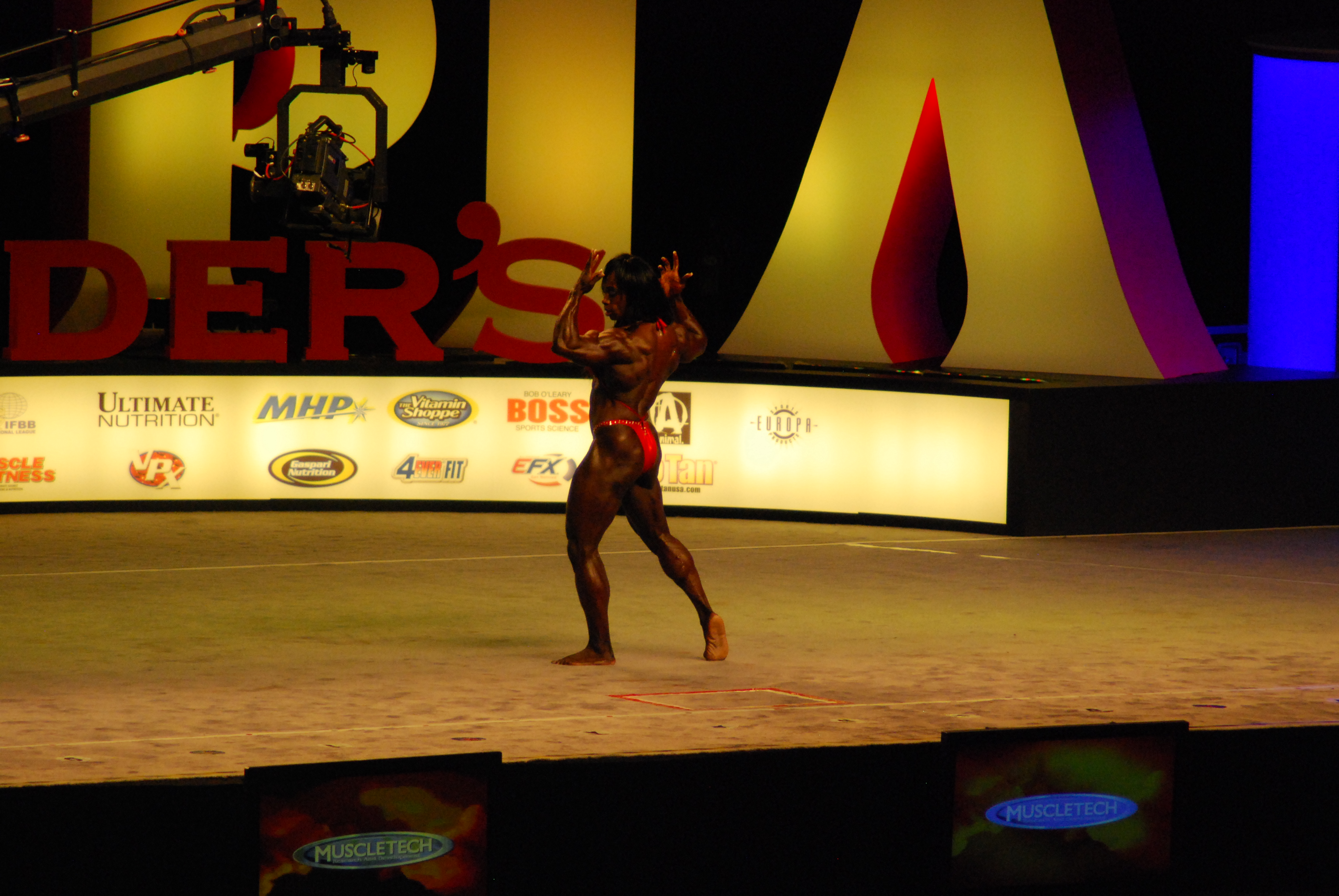

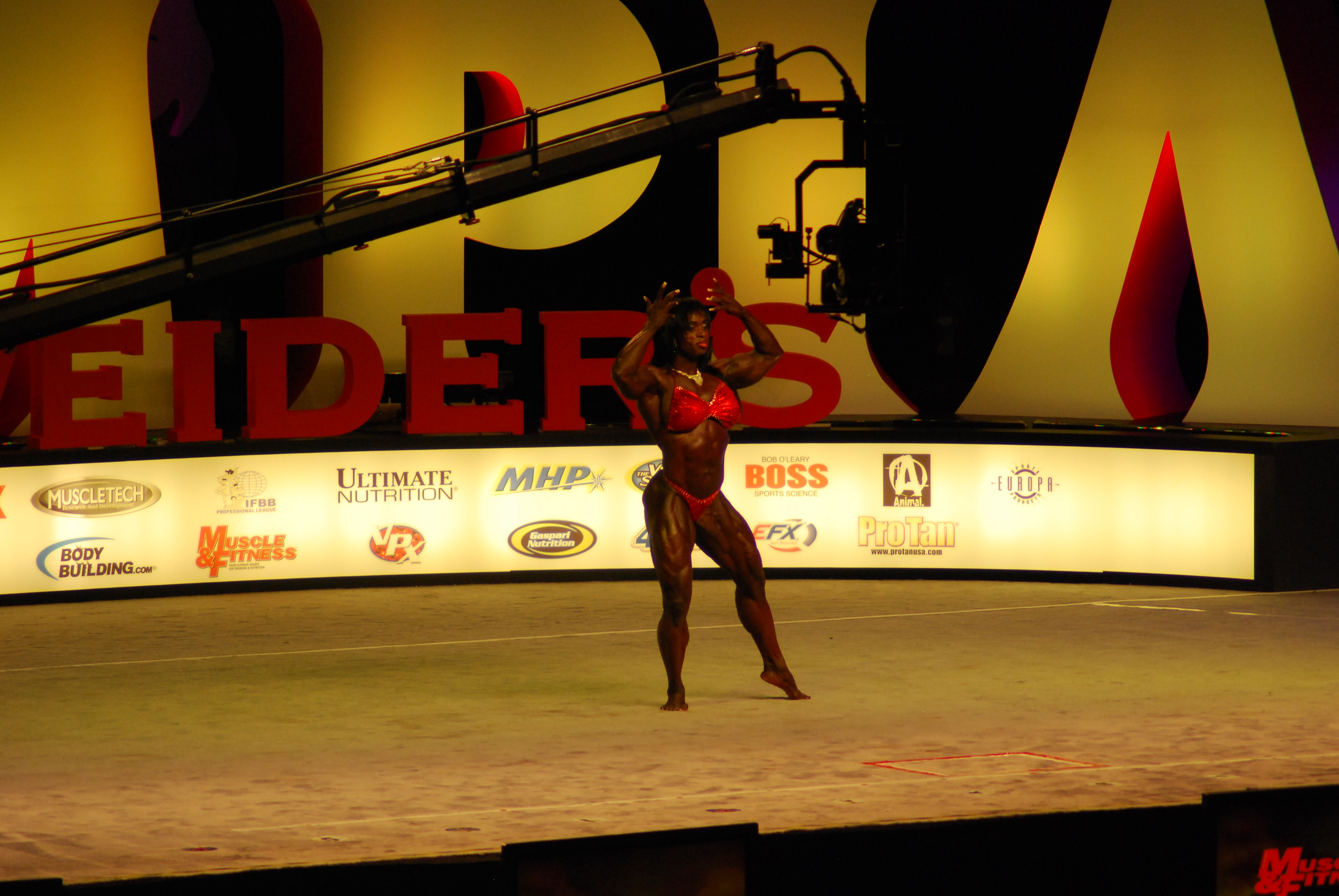

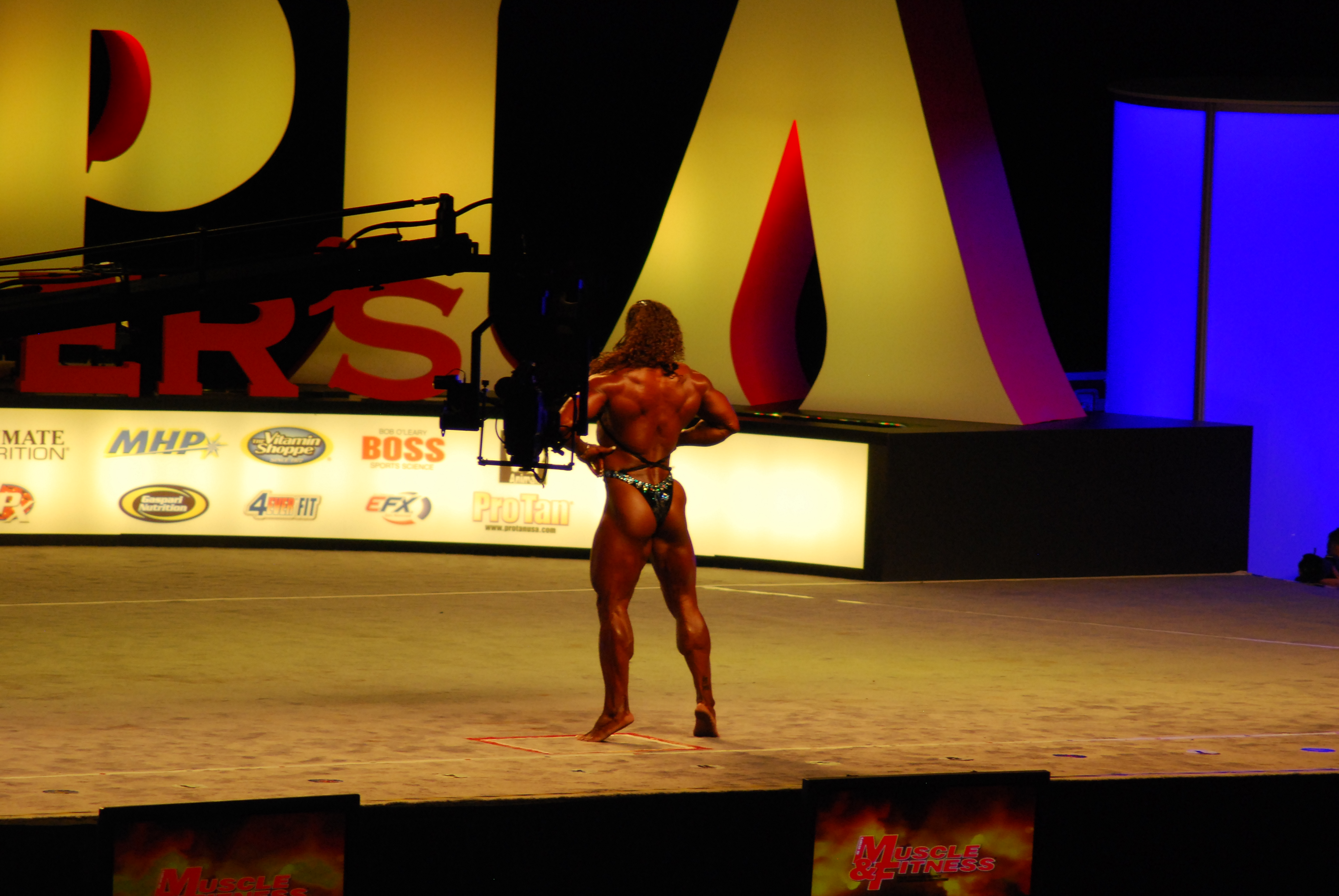

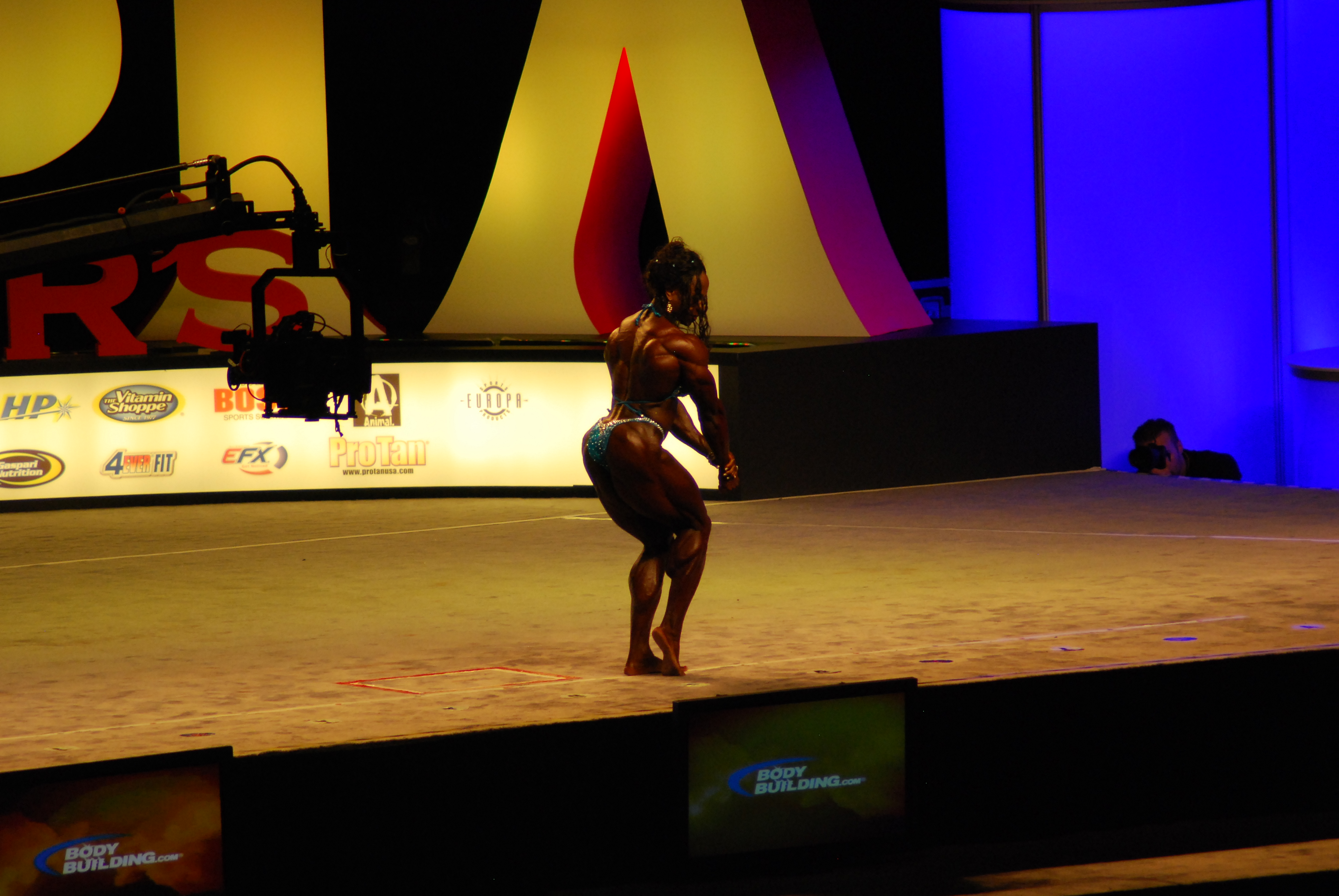

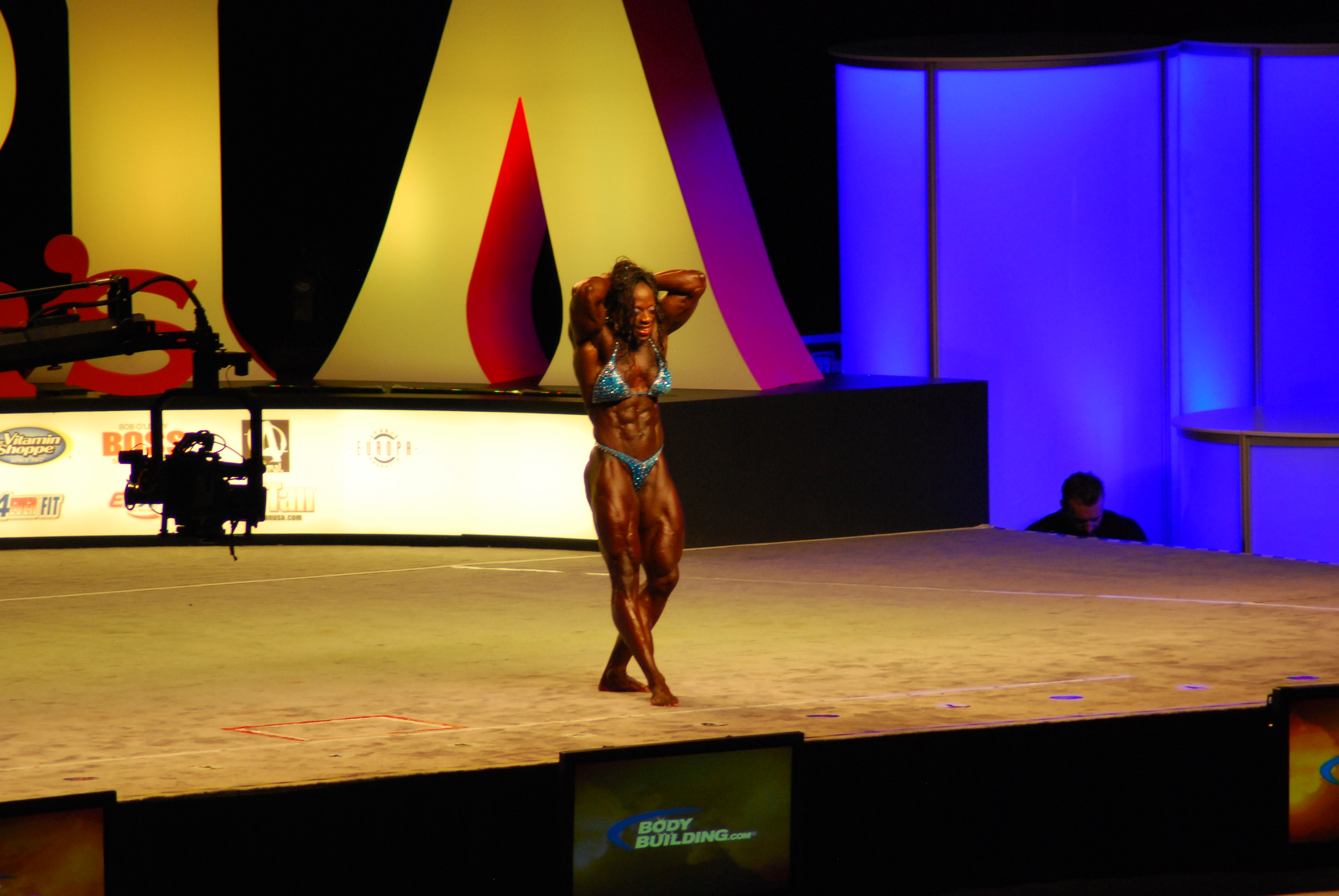

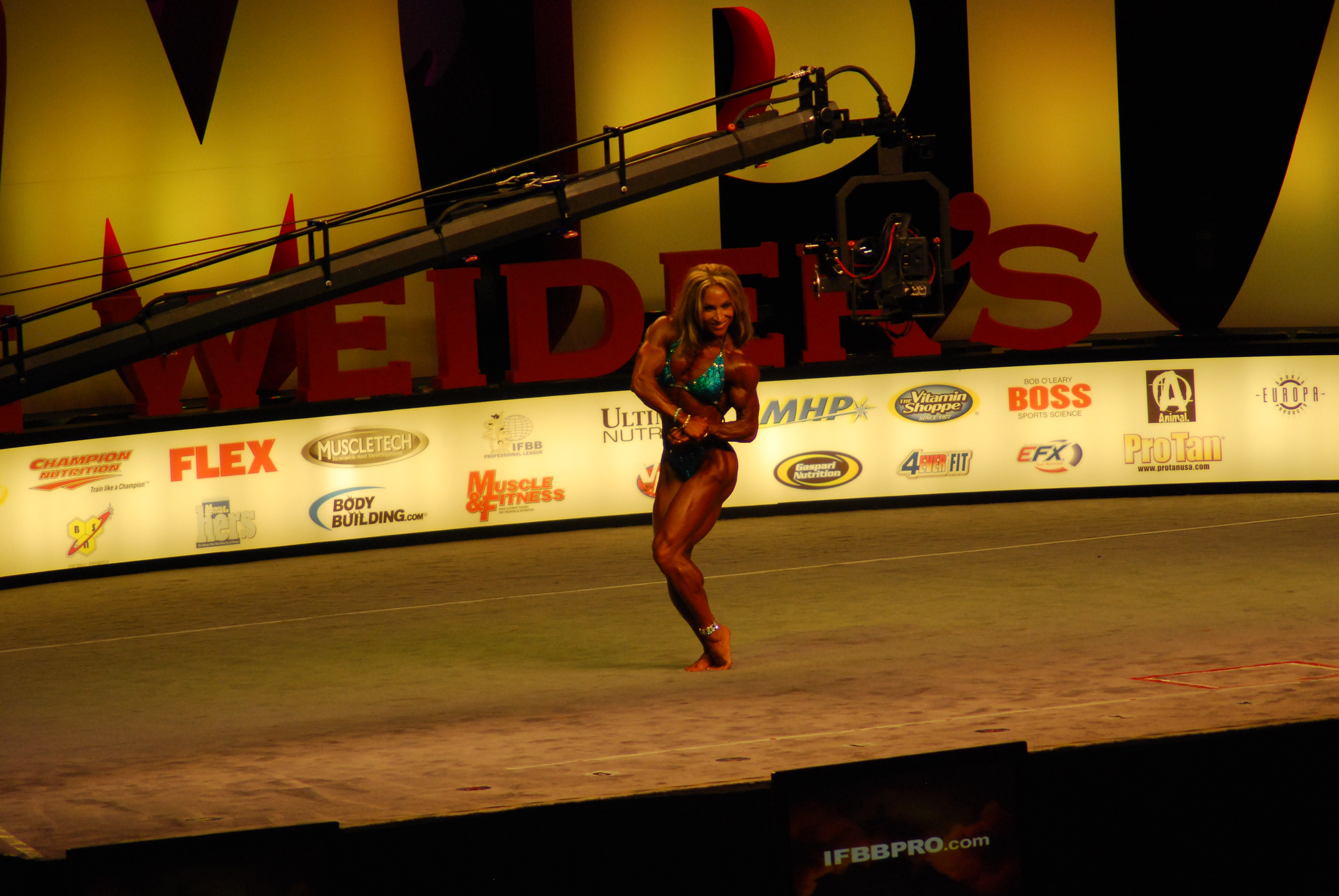

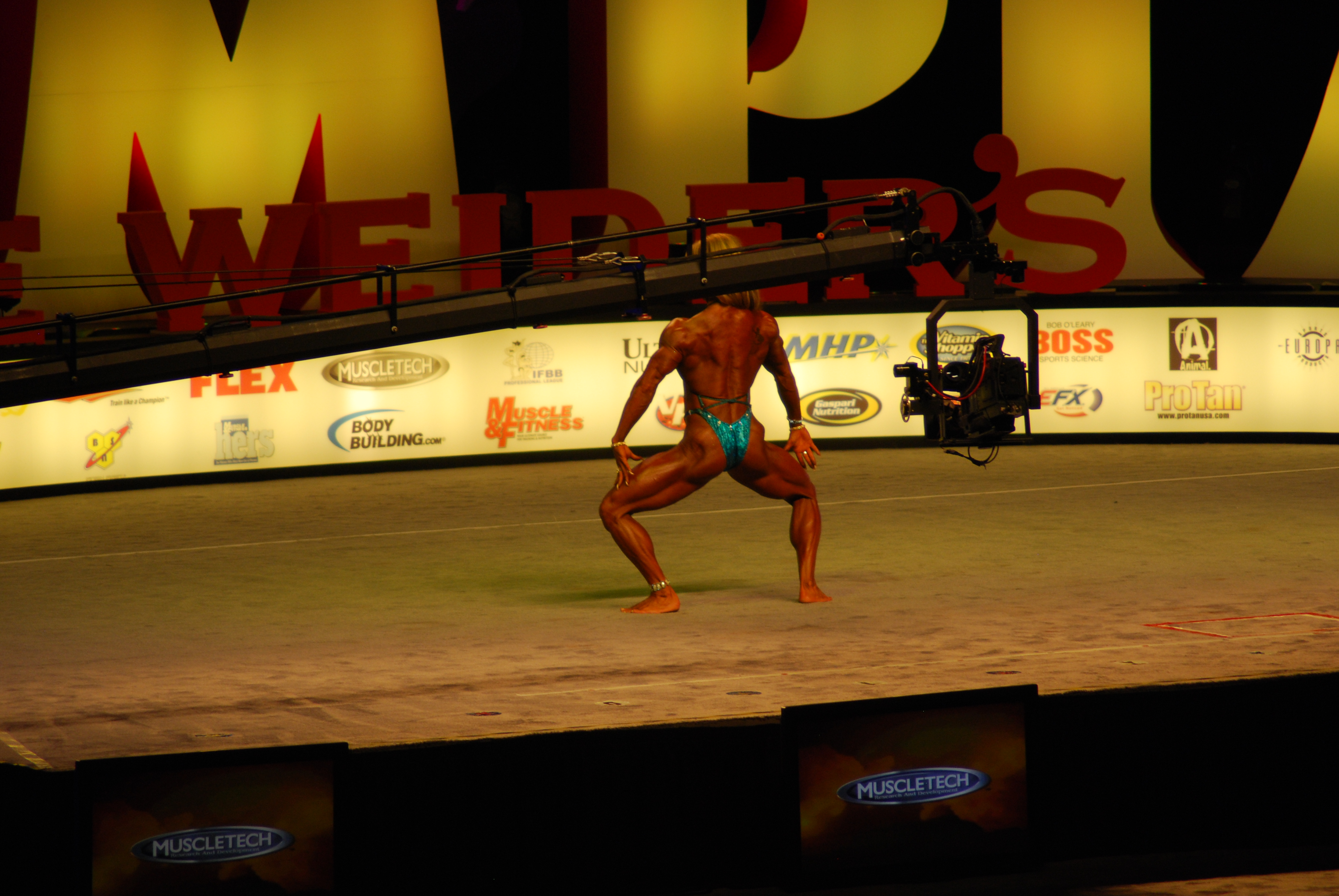

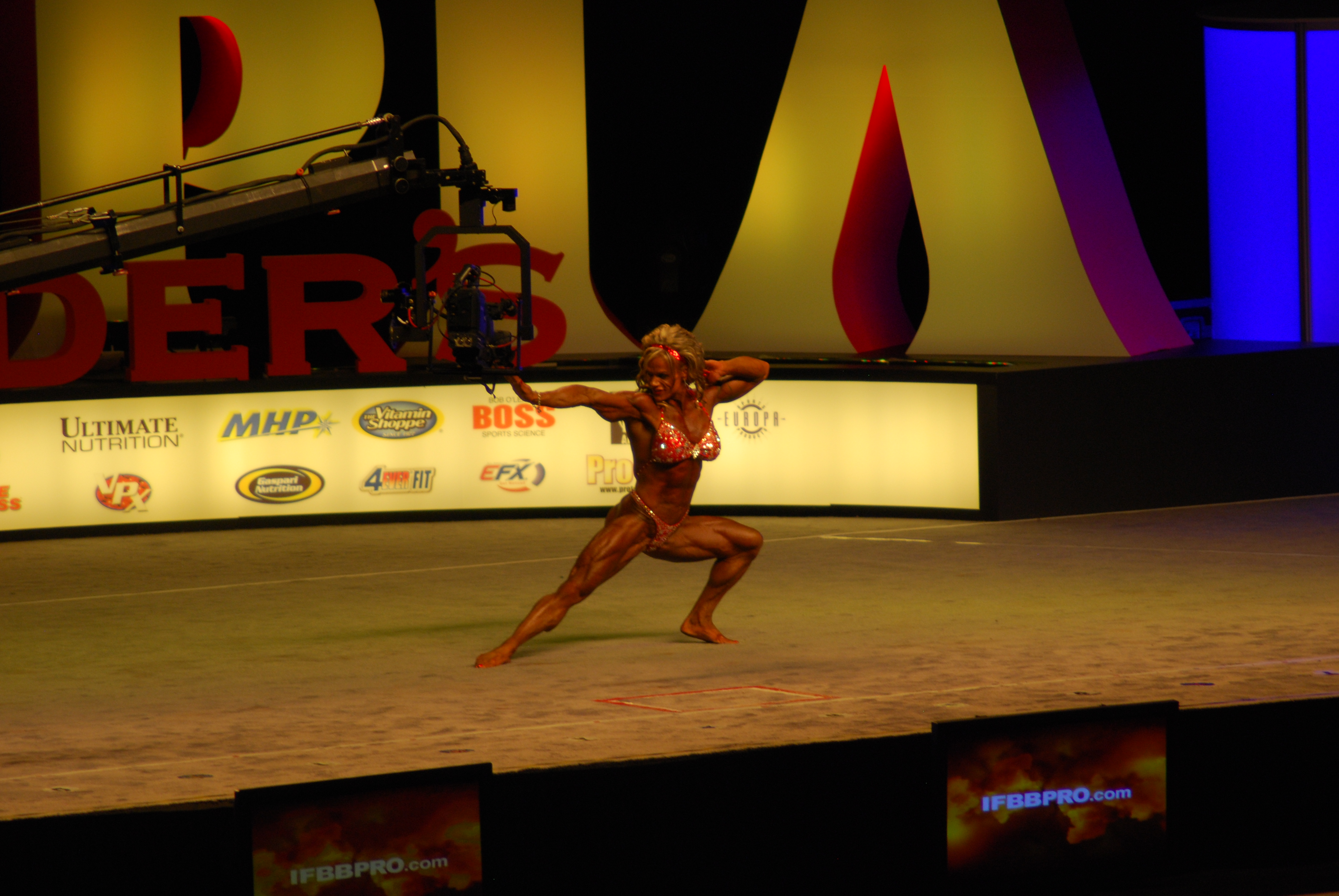

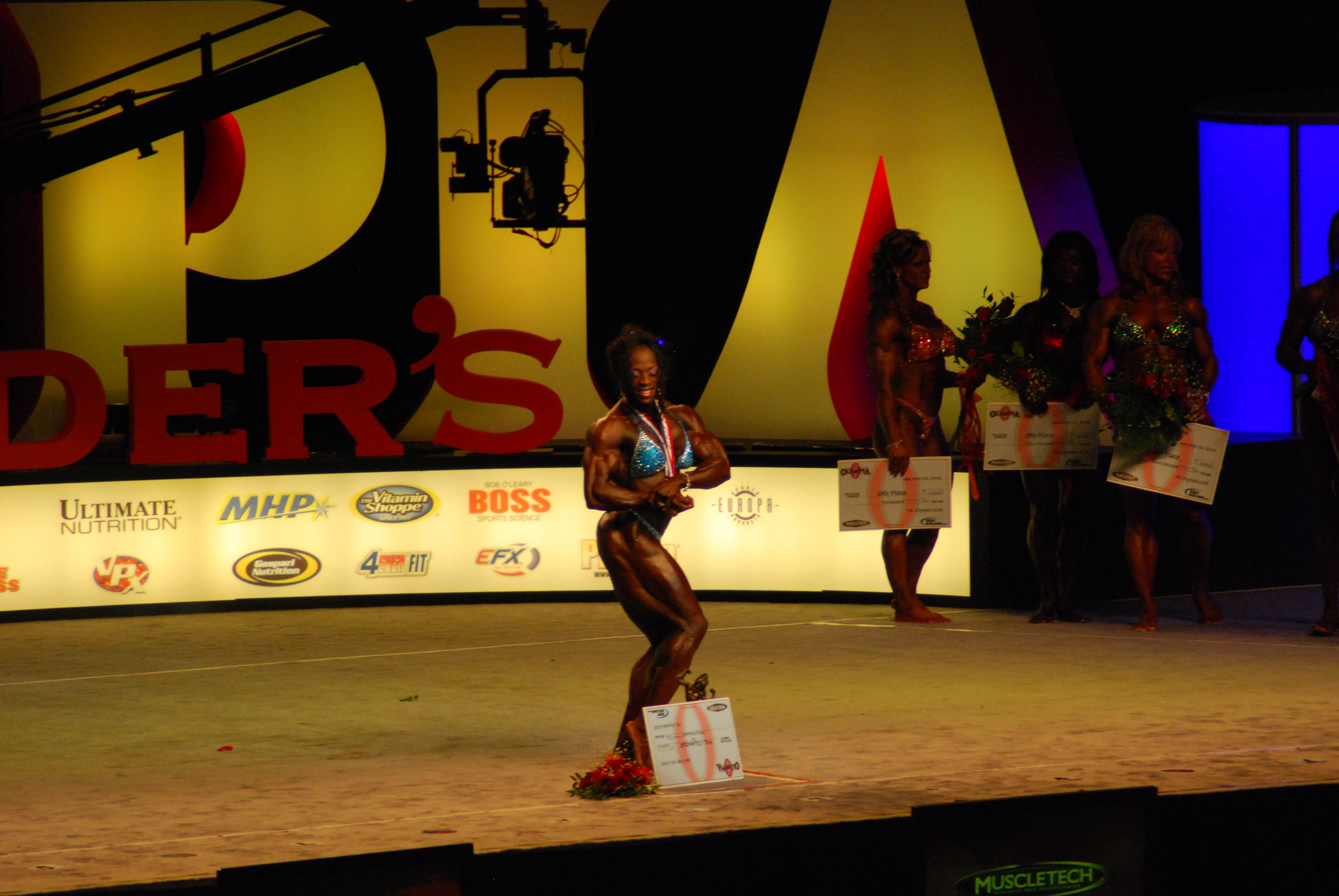

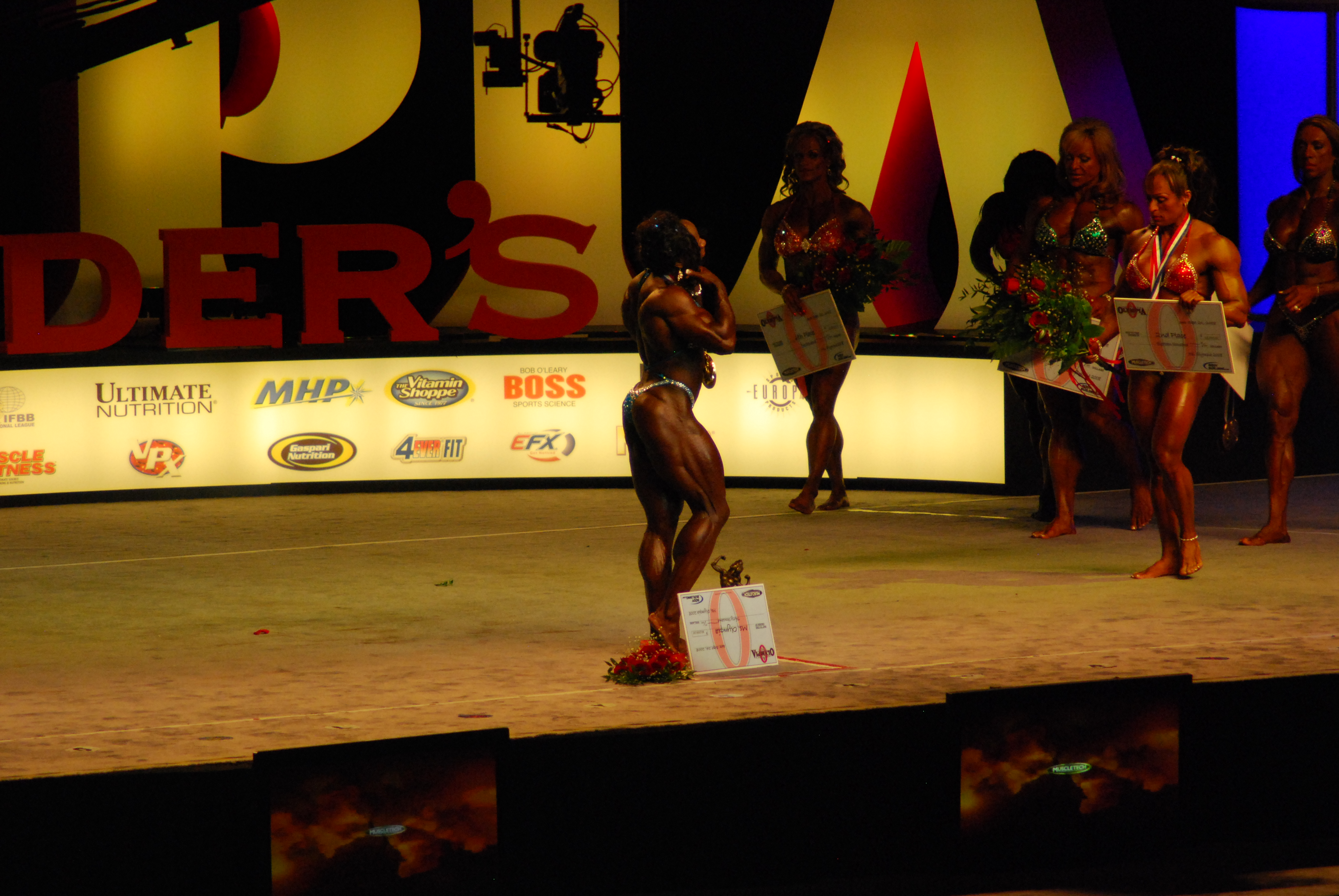

== See also ==
- 2008 Mr. Olympia
