= Loose Cannon =

A loose cannon was a hazard on a gun deck of a wooden warship; figuratively it can mean a person acting in a wild and unpredictable manner and a danger to their own side.

Loose Cannon or Loose Cannons may also refer to:

== Film ==
- Loose Cannons (1990 film), an American comedy film
- Loose Cannons (2010 film), an Italian comedy film

== Music ==
- Loose Cannon, a 2012 mixtape by Cashis
- Loose Cannon, a 2023 album by Jake Owen
- "Loose Cannon" a song by Killing Joke from the 2003 album Killing Joke
- "Loose Cannons", a song by Kurupt from the 1999 album Tha Streetz Iz a Mutha
- "Loose Cannons", a song by Dr. Dre from the 2015 album Compton

== Video games ==
- Jinx, also known as the "Loose Cannon", a character in the video game League of Legends
- Loose Cannon Studios, an American video game developer

== Other uses ==
- Jitka Harazimova (born 1975), also known as the "Loose Cannon", Czech bodybuilder
- Loose Cannon, a 2000 novel by Dean Ing
- Loose Cannon Productions, a British video production company that was known for its "tele-snap reconstructions" of Doctor Who

== See also ==
- The Loose Canon, a religious text of the Church of the Flying Spaghetti Monster
