= Debbie Bramwell-Washington =

American bodybuilder

Debbie Bramwell
- Professional bodybuilder
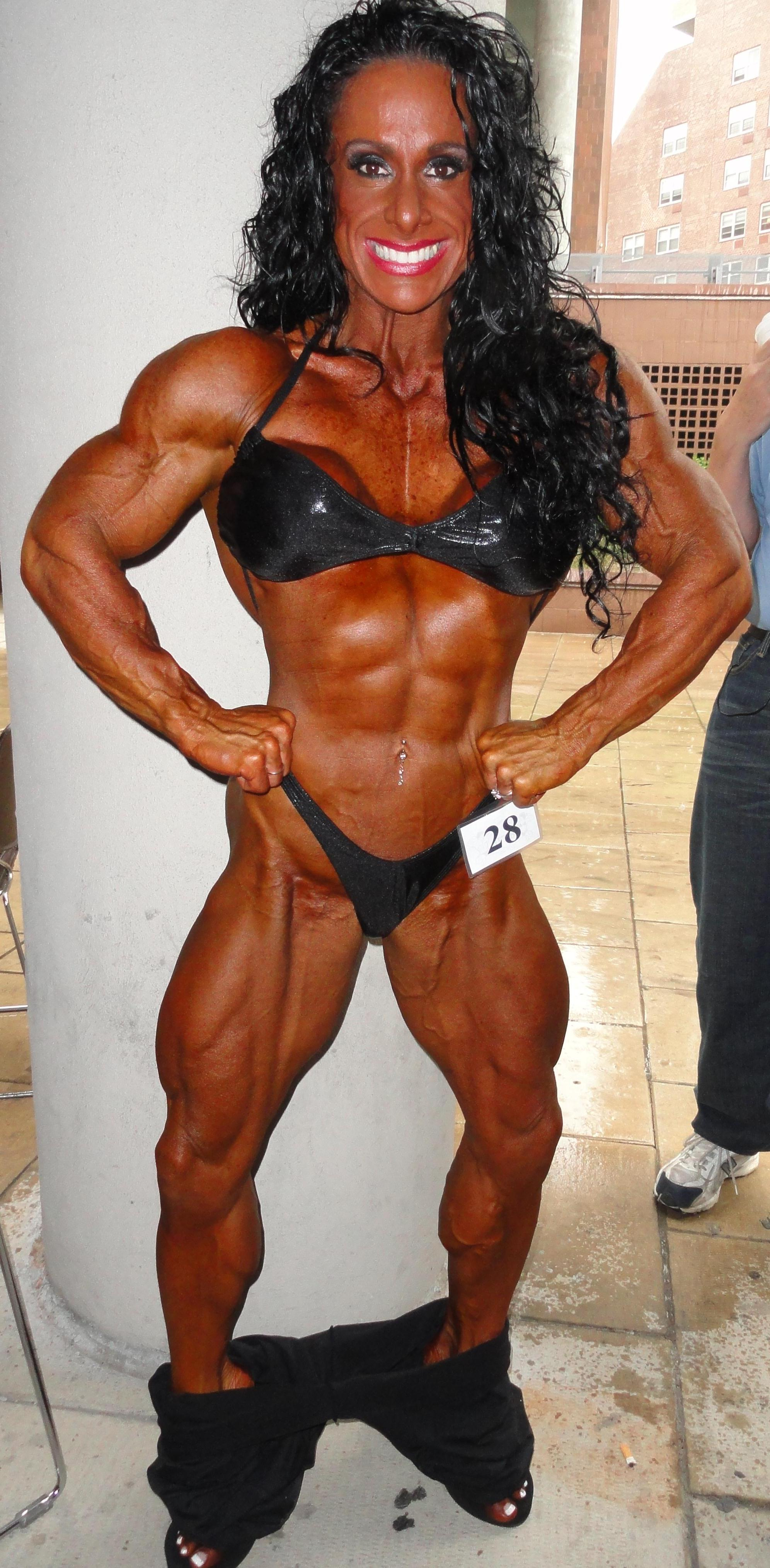
- Debbie Bramwell-Washington at the 2010 IFBB New York Pro

Personal info
- Born: June 9, 1966 (age 59); Parsippany-Troy Hills, New Jersey, United States

Best statistics
- Height: 5 ft 2.5 in (1.59 m)
- Weight: In Season: 144 lb (65 kg)

Professional (Pro) career
- Pro-debut: IFBB Europa Supershow; 2007
- Best win: NPC Masters Nationals; 2007
- Predecessor: Kim Buck
- Successor: Gayle Frankie
- Active: Retired 2012

Debbie Bramwell-Washington (born June 9, 1966) is an American professional female bodybuilder.

== Early childhood and education ==
Born Debbie Topoozian, she was born on June 6, 1966, in Parsippany-Troy Hills, New Jersey, of Armenian, Romanian, Russian, English and French ancestry. In 1984, she graduated from Parsippany High School. While in school she excelled on the girls' softball team as a pitcher and claims that she was able to defeat most of the boys in her classes at arm wrestling. After obtaining credentials as a beautician she moved first to Phoenix, Arizona, and later to La Jolla, California, where she eventually started her bodybuilding career.

== Bodybuilding ==
=== Amateur ===
At the age of 26, she joined her first gym in Phoenix, Arizona to stay in shape and a female personal trainer put her on a program and showed her how to train. Shortly afterwards she would meet a noncompetitive male bodybuilder who would show her how to get in shape. She would date the bodybuilder for 4 years. She never thought about competing as a bodybuilder until after she was persuaded by a trainer in a gym in San Diego in 1996, and after having completed Tony Robbins personal power program. Soon became evident that she had the genetics for bodybuilding and, after some persuasion, she entered her first contest in March 1997. She won her class, as well as the Overall. Her early contest history consisted mainly of regional shows which culminated in an overall victory in the 2001 Borderstates Championship.

She made her first National-level appearances in 2002, placing fifth in her class at the USA Championship and has been a consistent top five finisher ever since. In 2006 and 2007 she won the Masters National Lightheavyweight Championship and in 2007 she won the overall title at that competition giving her professional status.

=== Professional ===
Her most successful professional IFBB competition was the 2007 Europa Supershow, which she placed 2nd place. Since becoming pro she has managed to attend the Ms. Olympia competition in 2008.

=== Contest history ===
- 1997 San Diego Championships - 1st (HW & overall)
- 1997 Los Angeles Championships - 1st (MW)
- 1997 Borderstates - 1st (LW)
- 1999 San Diego - 1st (MW)
- 2000 Borderstates - 1st (MW)
- 2001 Borderstates - 1st (MW & overall)
- 2002 NPC USA Championship - 5th (MW)
- 2003 NPC USA Championship - 4th (MW)
- 2004 NPC USA Championship - 3rd (LHW)
- 2004 NPC Nationals - 6th (LHW)
- 2005 NPC USA Championship - 8th (LHW)
- 2005 North American Championship - 5th (LHW)
- 2006 Masters Nationals - 1st (LHW)
- 2006 NPC USA Championship - 4th (LHW)
- 2006 North American Championship - 3rd (LHW)
- 2007 Masters Nationals - 1st (LHW & overall)
- 2007 Europa Supershow - 2nd (LW)
- 2007 Atlantic City Pro - 5th (LW)
- 2008 New York Pro - 7th (tie - open class)
- 2008 Tampa Pro Show - 3rd (open class)
- 2008 Europa Supershow - 4th (LW)
- 2008 Ms. Olympia - 13th
- 2009 New York Pro - 4h (open class)
- 2010 New York Pro - 4th (open class)
- 2010 Tampa Pro Show - 7th
- 2010 Hartford Europa Show - 5th
- 2011 Tampa Pro Show - 10th
- 2011 Hartford Europa Show - 7th
- 2012 Wings of Strength Chicago Pro-Am Extravaganza - 7th
- 2012 PBW Tampa Pro - 8th

== Personal life ==
Branwell is currently married to Ali Washington and lives in Birmingham, Alabama. She is a Christian and works as a personal trainer and posing coach.

== Television appearances ==
Debbie was a prominent character in the Learning Channel's documentary Supersize She, which focused on her friend and professional female bodybuilder Joanna Thomas.

She was the subject of the documentary Winning Big which follows her as she trains for and eventually wins the 2007 NPC Masters National Championship in Pittsburgh, Pennsylvania.
