= Dena Westerfield =

American IFBB professional female bodybuilder

- ♀ Professional bodybuilder

Personal info
- Nickname: Dr. Sexy
- Born: January 26, 1971 (age 55); St. Petersburg, Florida, U.S.

Best statistics
- Height: 5 ft 2 in (1.57 m)
- Weight: On-season: 131–145 lb (59–66 kg); Off-season: 155 lb (70 kg)

Professional (Pro) career
- Pro-debut: International Federation of Bodybuilding and Fitness Professional League (IFBB) Europa Super Show; 2006
- Active: Retired since 2011
Medal record
2nd	2006 IFBB Europa Super Show	Open
2nd	2007 IFBB Jan Tana Classic	Lightweight

Dr. Dena Michele Westerfield, D.C., (born January 26, 1971) is an American IFBB professional female bodybuilder, chiropractic doctor, personal trainer and massage therapist. She lives in Chesterfield, a suburb of St. Louis, Missouri.

== Early life and education ==
Dena Westerfield was born, and spent most of her life, in St. Petersburg, Florida. A seasoned athlete, she graduated with her pre-med degree from USF in 2000. Westerfield studied massage therapy at the Humanities Center (now called Cortiva Institute) in Pinellas Park, Florida. She left Florida in 2000 to attend Life College of Chiropractic in Marietta, Georgia.

In 2002, she was a student at Logan College of Chiropractic in Chesterfield, Missouri. In 2004, she opened the Westerfield Health Center there.

== Bodybuilding career ==
=== Amateur ===
Westerfield started seriously training for bodybuilding prior the 1999 2000 Women’s Tri- Fitness. With the help of her trainer, Ty Felder, she won her first contest, the 2001 NPC Coastal. In Marietta, Georgia, she met with national-level heavyweight bodybuilder Mimi Jabalee and they started training together. In October 2003, she moved to Ballwin, Missouri and started training at Wild Horse Fitness, with Henry Lovelace, the gym's owner and her sponsor.

In 2001, she competed at her first contest at the NPC USA Costal as a heavyweight (136 lbs) and won the heavyweight and overall title. At the 2003 Junior Nationals, she competed as a middleweight (131 lbs) and won the middleweight and overall title. At the 2003 USA, she placed 7th in the middleweights. In July 2004, she opened her own business, Westerfield Health Center, which was four months before the 2004 Nationals. She found it difficult opening a new practice and training for the Nationals. At the 2004 Nationals, she placed 4th in the light heavy weight class (140lbs). After the 2004 NPC National, she started working with Charles Glass and Dave Palumbo. Her bodybuilding manager was Joel Goldberg. In 2005, she won the light heavy weight class (131lbs) at the 2005 NPC Nationals, winning her IFBB Pro League card.

=== Professional ===
At 2006 Europa Super Show, Dena made her pro debut, placing 2nd and qualifying for the first time for the Ms. Olympia. At the 2006 Ms. Olympia, she placed 14th. At the 2007 Jan Tana Classic, she competed as a lightweight and placed 2nd. At the 2007 Europa Super Show she finished 4th in the lightweight class. Also in 2007, she started being sponsored by Species Nutrition. In 2010, she appeared as herself on the episode "Four successful muscle mountains" of the Swedish documentary series called The Secret Lives of Women.

=== Contest history ===
- 2001 National Physique Committee (NPC) USA Coastal - 1st (Overall (OA) and heavyweight (HW))
- 2003 NPC Junior Nationals - 1st (OA and middleweight (MW))
- 2003 NPC USA - 7th (MW)
- 2004 NPC Nationals - 4th (Light heavyweight (LHW))
- 2005 NPC Nationals - 1st (LHW)
- 2006 International Federation of Bodybuilding and Fitness Professional League (IFBB) Europa Super Show - 2nd
- 2006 IFBB Ms. Olympia - 14th
- 2007 IFBB Jan Tana Classic - 2nd (Lightweight (LW))
- 2007 IFBB Europa Super Show - 4th (LW)
- 2008 IFBB New York Pro - 4th
- 2009 IFBB Ms. International - 9th
- 2009 IFBB New York Pro - 5th
- 2010 IFBB Phoenix Pro - 5th
- 2010 IFBB Ms. International - 13th
- 2011 IFBB Pro Bodybuilding Weekly Championships - 15th

=== Best statistics ===
- Bench press - 315 lb (143 kg)
- Bicep curls - 165 lb (75 kg)
- Biceps - 15 3/4 inches (40 cm)
- Calves - 15 3/4 inches (40 cm)
- Chest - 41 inches (100 cm)
- Forearms - 12 3/4 inches (32 cm)
- Leg press - 1,500 lb (680 kg)
- On season weight - 131–150 lb (59–68 kg)
- Quads - 24 inches (61 cm)
- Squat - 315 lb (143 kg)
