= Heather Armbrust =

American professional female bodybuilder

- professional bodybuilder
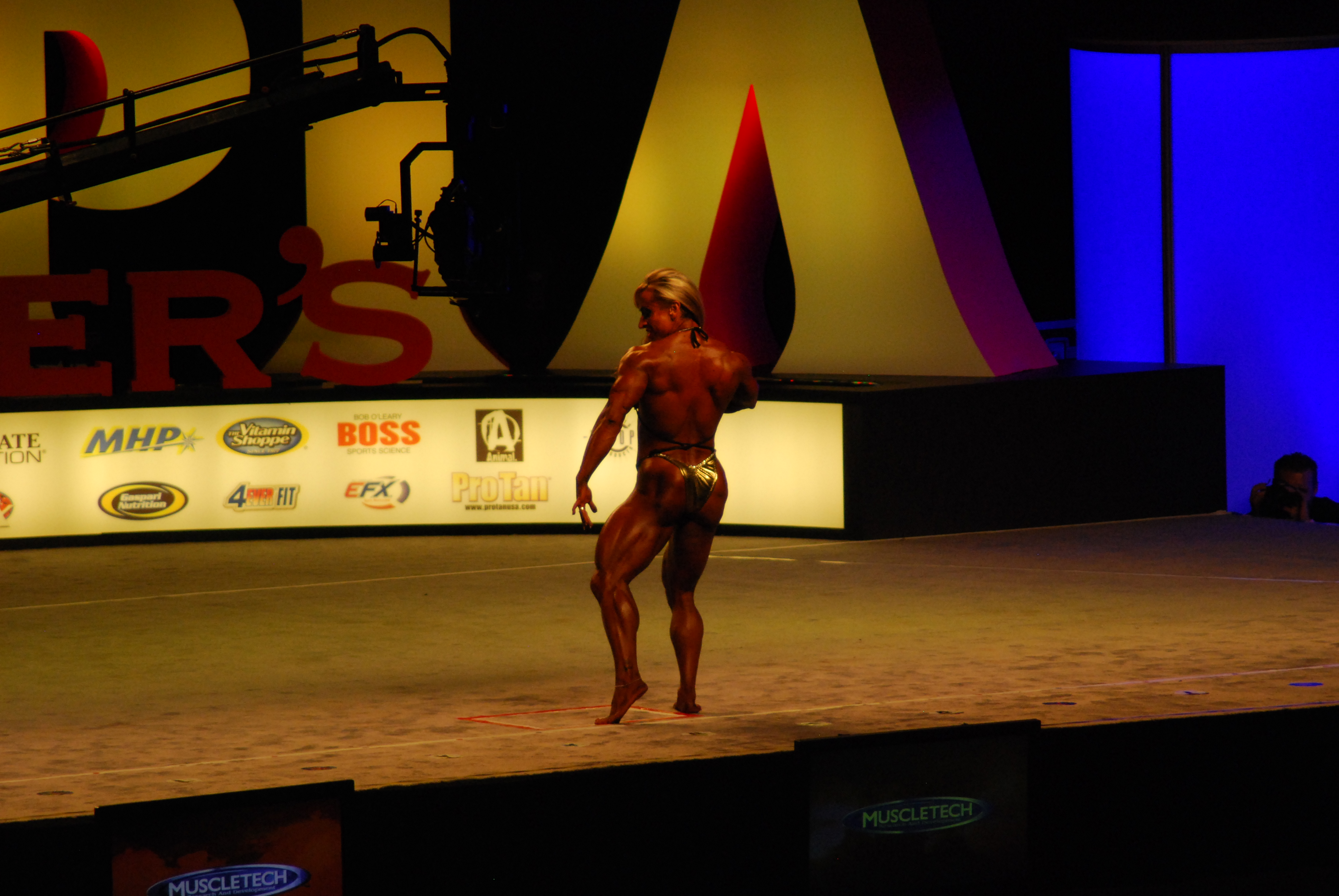
- Heather Armbrust posing on September 26, 2008 during the 2008 Ms. Olympia finals.

Personal info
- Born: July 21, 1977 (age 47); Cozad, Nebraska

Best statistics
- Height: 5 ft 7 in (1.70 m)
- Weight: In Season: 173 lb (78 kg); Off-Season: 185 lb (84 kg)

Professional (Pro) career
- Pro-debut: IFBB Sacramento Pro Bodybuilding Grand Prix; 2007
- Best win: IFBB Sacramento Pro Bodybuilding Grand Prix; 2007
- Predecessor: None
- Successor: None
- Active: Retired 2011

Heather Marie Armbrust (née Policky) (born July 21, 1977) is an American professional female bodybuilder.

== Early life and education ==
Armbrust was born in 1977 and raised in Cozad, Nebraska. She became interested in bodybuilding at the age of 12 after being introduced to the local gym owner who happened to be a female competitor. After graduating Cozad High School, she moved to Denver, Colorado. In 1998, Heather moved to Texas where she lived in Houston, San Antonio, and finally Dallas. In 2001, she moved back to Denver where she currently lives. She eventually attended college at Red Rocks Community College.

== Bodybuilding career ==
=== Amateur ===
At the age of 12 she met the owner of the only gym in Cozad, Nebraska, Kayleen Canas, who happened to be a competitive bodybuilder, and her muscular physique instantly appealed to her. She began hanging out at the gym after school every day and Kay quickly became "like a big sister" to her. Under her guidance, she began training. She trained sporadically during her teenage years, and after graduating from high school, she moved to Denver, and then to Dallas, where she started dating a bodybuilder. Finally, shortly after her 21st birthday, she started training regularly and eating consistently, but still had no wish to compete.

It was only in 2000 that Heather did her first NPC show, after Brian Crull, an ex-NPC judge in Texas, offered to prep her for free. She won two local shows in Texas in 2000 and, after moving back to Denver, the heavyweight and overall at the Colorado State the following year. In 2002, in an incredible first year at national level, she placed second in the heavyweights at the Junior Nationals, fourth at the USA, and then fifth in an exceptional heavyweight class at the Nationals in Dallas. At the age of 25 (she turned 25 a week before the USA) and after only two years competing, she was one of the top heavyweight bodybuilders in the US. In 2006, she won the overall and heavyweight at the USA Championships, thus winning her pro card.

=== Professional ===
Heather competed first Ms. International in 2007, where she placed 3rd. She also competed in her first Ms. Olympia in 2007 where she placed 5th. In 2009, she came in second place in Ms. Olympia. Due to injuries, she could not attend the 2010 Ms. International. She also went through a series of personal problems that included going through a divorce, alcohol and drug use, as well as a stint in rehab, caused her to stay away from the sport and the fitness lifestyle in general.

=== Retirement ===
In 2011, Heather retired from bodybuilding. In a 2012 interview, she said that she planned to come out of retirement in 2013, but never competed that year.

=== Legacy ===
Before her retirement she was regarded by many with the most potential to dethrone Iris Kyle at the Ms Olympia.

=== Contest history ===
- 2000 North Texas - 1st
- 2000 South Texas - 1st
- 2001 Colorado State - 1st
- 2002 Junior Nationals - 2nd
- 2002 Nationals - 5th
- 2002 USA Championships - 4th
- 2003 USA Championships - 5th
- 2005 USA Championships - 1st
- 2006 USA Championships - 1st
- 2007 IFBB Sacramento Pro Bodybuilding Grand Prix - 1st
- 2007 IFBB Ms. International - 3rd
- 2007 IFBB Ms. Olympia - 5th
- 2008 IFBB Ms. Olympia - 14th
- 2009 IFBB Ms. International - 4th
- 2009 IFBB Ms. Olympia - 2nd

== Personal life ==
Heather currently lives in Wheat Ridge, Colorado. In 2007, she married Dylan Armbrust. In 2009, she divorced Dylan. On January 17, 2014, she became engaged again to Dylan. From 2006 to 2008 she was co-owner of the Armbrust PRO Gym in Wheat Ridge, Colorado.
