= Annie Rivieccio =

American fitness competitor

- Professional bodybuilder
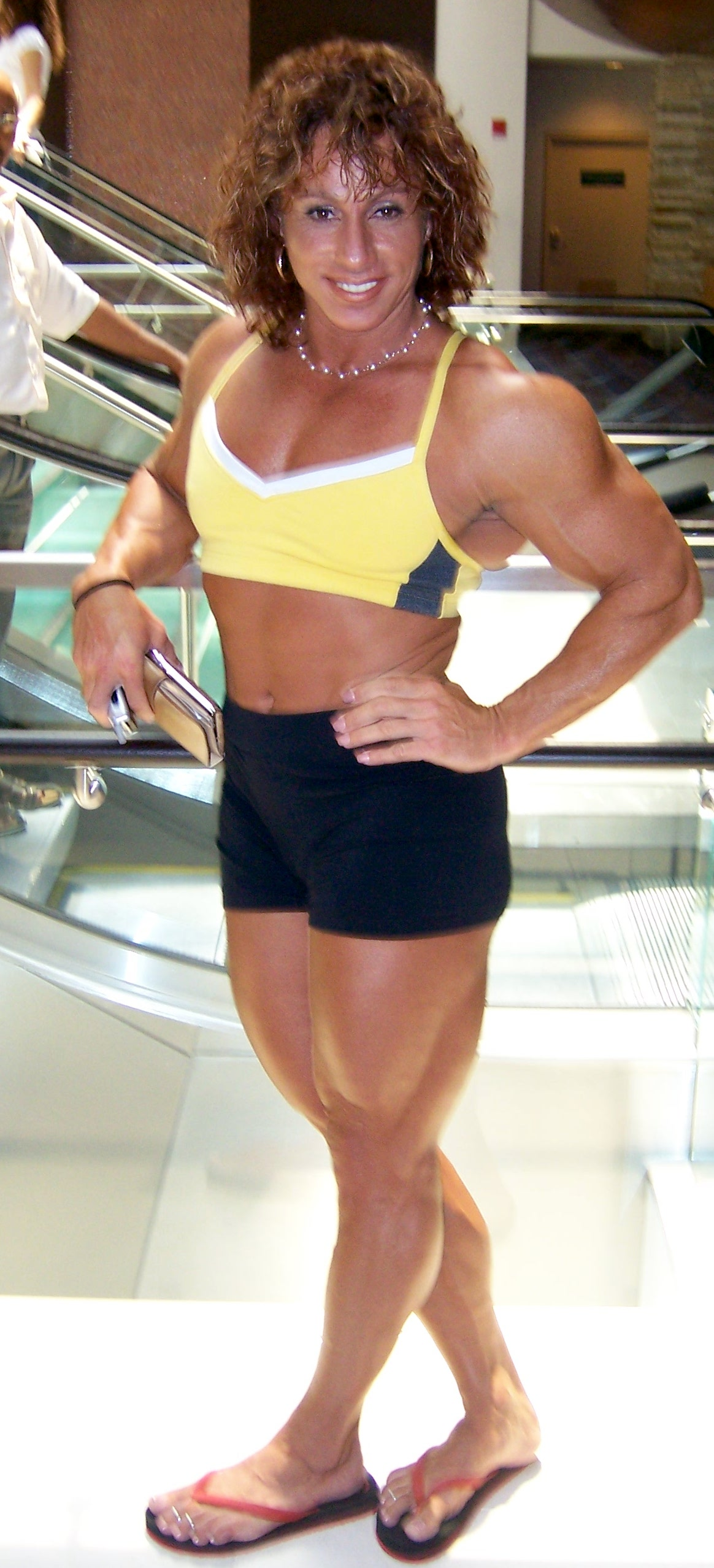
- Rivieccio in 2007

Personal info
- Born: 1962 (age 63–64); Georgia, United States

Best statistics

Annie Rivieccio (born 1962) is an American bodybuilder and personal trainer. She competed at the Ms. Olympia in 2005–2007 with the best result of third place in 2006. She won the NPC Nationals in 2003 and New York Pro Championship in 2005. She started her bodybuilding career in 1986, aged 24, and later also competed in Olympic weightlifting and powerlifting.

== Contest history ==
- 2008 IFBB Atlantic City Pro – 7th
- 2008 IFBB 15th Annual Sports/Fitness Weekend & Europa IFBB Super Show – 3rd
- 2008 NPC Tampa Bay Bodybuilding & Figure Contest – 6th
- 2008 IFBB New York Women's Pro – 6th
- 2008 IFBB Arnold Classic Bodybuilding, Fitness and Figure Contest – 8th
- 2007 IFBB Olympia – 10th
- 2007 IFBB Arnold Classic – 7th
- 2006 IFBB Olympia – 3rd
- 2006 IFBB Arnold Classic and Internationals – 7th
- 2005 IFBB Olympia – 13th
- 2005 IFBB New York Pro Championship – 1st
- 2004 IFBB GNC Show Of Strength – 5th
- 2004 IFBB Night of Champions – 7th
- 2004 IFBB Arnold Classic and Internationals – 4th
- 2003 NPC Nationals – 1st, heavyweight and overall
