= Colette Nelson =

American professional female bodybuilder

- Professional bodybuilder
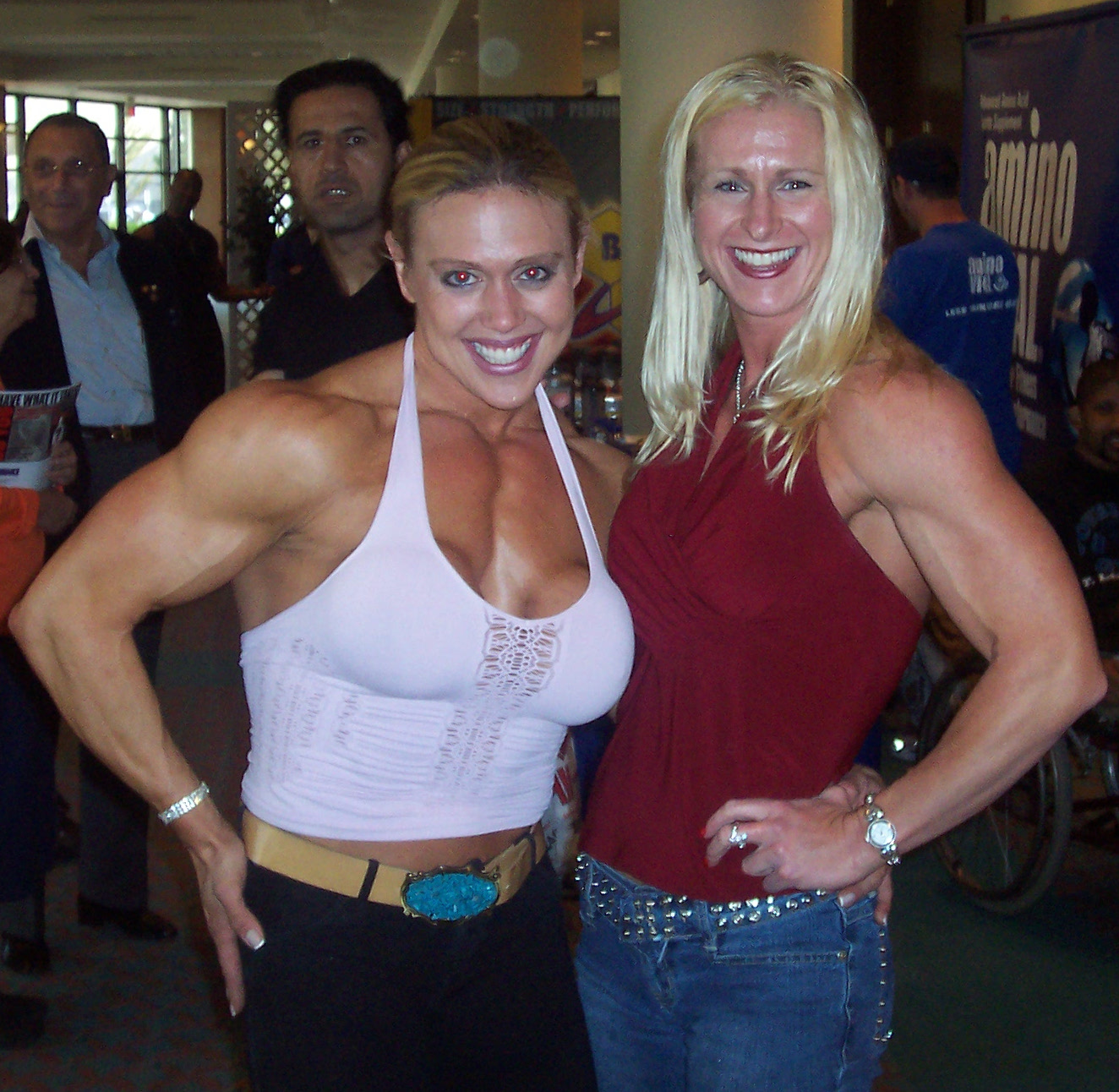
- Colette Nelson (left) in 2005, with fellow bodybuilder Debbie Patton

Personal info
- Born: April 5, 1974 (age 52); Southfield, Michigan, U.S.

Best statistics
- Height: 5 ft 5 in (1.65 m)
- Weight: In Season: 145 lb (66 kg); Off-Season: 175 lb (79 kg)

Professional (Pro) career
- Pro-debut: IFBB New York Pro Championships; 2005
- Best win: IFBB North American Bodybuilding Championships champion; 2004
- Predecessor: Lisa Aukland
- Successor: Kimberly Perez
- Active: Retired 2010 (bodybuilding)

Colette Nelson (born April 5, 1974) is a former American professional female bodybuilder and nurse practitioner.

== Early life and education ==
Colette Nelson was born in 1974 in Southfield, Michigan and grew up in Royal Oak. At the age of 12 years, she was diagnosed with type 1 diabetes. Her doctor told her that he would start her on insulin and she has to exercise to keep her blood pressure under control. She attended Clarence M. Kimball High School and graduated as part of the class of 1992. In high school, she became obsessed with exercise, teaching up to 20 aerobics classes a week. She attended Michigan State University where she received a bachelor's degree in dietetics and a minor in dance. After graduating from college, she moved to New York City to attend New York University. She finished her master's degree in clinical nutrition and became a registered dietician and a certified diabetes educator. She also passed a board certified exam to become a sports dietician.

== Bodybuilding career ==
=== Amateur ===
During her freshman year at Michigan State University, at the age of 19 years, she started to develop an interest in weight training when she attended the Powerhouse Gym and encountered her first female bodybuilder working at the front desk of the gym. Prior to weight training, she was an aerobics instructor, who was teaching up to 20 aerobics classes a week, and dancer.

She met a male bodybuilder who began training her and helped with her diet. The male bodybuilder introduced her to a female bodybuilder and suggested they start training five days a week and work one body part a day. She gave up aerobics classes and started serious bodybuilding training. By the time she had completed her undergraduate degree in nutrition, she had gone from 120 lb (54 kg) to 155 lb (70 kg).

In 1999, after 6 years of consistent training, at the weight of 165 lb (75 kg), she began competing and won her first middleweight class at her first competition. In 2000, she won the heavyweight class and overall at the Northeastern Championships. That same year she also came in first in heavyweight at the USA Championships. In 2001 and 2002, she came in 1st in the heavyweight class at the USA Championships. In 2004, she won the heavyweight class at the Team Universe. That same year, she won her IFBB pro card at the North American Championships and qualified again for an IFBB pro card when she won the overall at the World Amateur Championships.

=== Professional ===
In 2005, Colette attended her first professional competition, the New York Pro, which she placed 5th in the heavyweight class. In 2006, after coming in 3rd place the 2006 Europa Super Show, she qualified for her first Ms. Olympia, which she placed 13th.

=== Retirement ===
After competing at the 2010 IFBB Phoenix Pro, Colette retired from bodybuilding to compete in women's physique. She competed in 2014 in the Omaha and Toronto Pro and has now officially retired from competition to focus on her medical career.

=== Contest history ===
- 1999 Ultimate Bodybuilding Championship – 1st (MW)
- 2000 NPC Team Universe – 4th (HW)
- 2000 NPC Northeastern Championships – 1st (HW and overall)
- 2000 NPC Nationals – 6th (MW)
- 2001 NPC USA Championships – 1st (HW)
- 2001 IFBB North American Championships – 2nd (HW)
- 2001 NPC Nationals – 3rd (HW)
- 2002 NPC USA Championships – 1st (HW)
- 2003 NPC USA Championships – 2nd (HW)
- 2004 NPC Team Universe – 1st (HW)
- 2004 IFBB North American Championships – 1st (LHW and overall)
- 2004 IFBB World Amateur Championships – 1st (HW and overall)
- 2005 IFBB New York Pro – 5th (HW)
- 2006 IFBB Europa Super Show – 3rd
- 2006 IFBB Atlantic City – 8th
- 2006 IFBb Ms. Olympia – 13th
- 2007 IFBB Ms. International – 14th
- 2008 IFBB Ms. International – 13th
- 2008 IFBB New York Pro – 12th
- 2010 IFBB New York Pro – 9th
- 2010 IFBB Phoenix Pro – 6th

== Physique career ==
=== Contest history ===
- 2014 IFBB Toronto Pro Supershow – 11th
- 2014 IFBB Omaha Pro – 16th

== Personal life ==
Colette currently lives in NYC. She has been in relationships with CEO and founder of RXMuscle Dave Palumbo and IFBB Pro and karate master Bryan Paz for three years. She is a diabetes educator. She helps competitors with diet, training and posing. She performs choreography routines, mix music, and web design for the sites of many athletes as well as corporations. She also owns her own spray tanning business and does hair and make-up for many competitive female bodybuilders.

== Media appearances ==
=== Filmography ===
| Year | Title | Role | Notes |
|---|---|---|---|
| 2008 | Flex in the City | Herself | Internet film; satire of Sex in the City Movie |
| 2008 | The McCain Girl | She-Hulk | Internet film; Pro-John McCain film and satire of Obama Girl |

=== Television ===
| Year | Title | Role | Notes |
|---|---|---|---|
| 2000 | Body of Work | Herself | MSNBC bodybuilding documentary |
| 2001 | Thanksgiving Day nutrition segment | Herself | Fox Five News |
| 2001 | Nutrition commentary | Herself | Inside Edition |
| 2002 | Cleavage | Herself | A&E |
| 2003 | Too Buff to get a Date | Herself | The Jenny Jones Show |
| 2004 | MTV's MADE | Herself | MTV |
| 2005 | Order of the Serpentine | Imka | Spike |
| 2006 | Beyond the Brawn | Herself | Bodybuilding documentary |
| 2008 | Hooked: Muscle Women | Herself | MSNBC bodybuilding documentary |
| 2008 | Geraldo At Large | Herself | Fox News |

=== Commercials ===
| Year | Title | Role | Notes |
|---|---|---|---|
| 2005 | Thanksgiving Day commercial | Herself | Food Network |
| 2006 | Ring Tones commercial | Herself | MTV Video Music Awards |
| 2007 | Pizza commercial | Herself | Domino's internet Commercial |

== See also ==
- Female bodybuilding
- List of female professional bodybuilders
