= Sarah Dunlap =

American bodybuilder

- ♀ professional bodybuilder
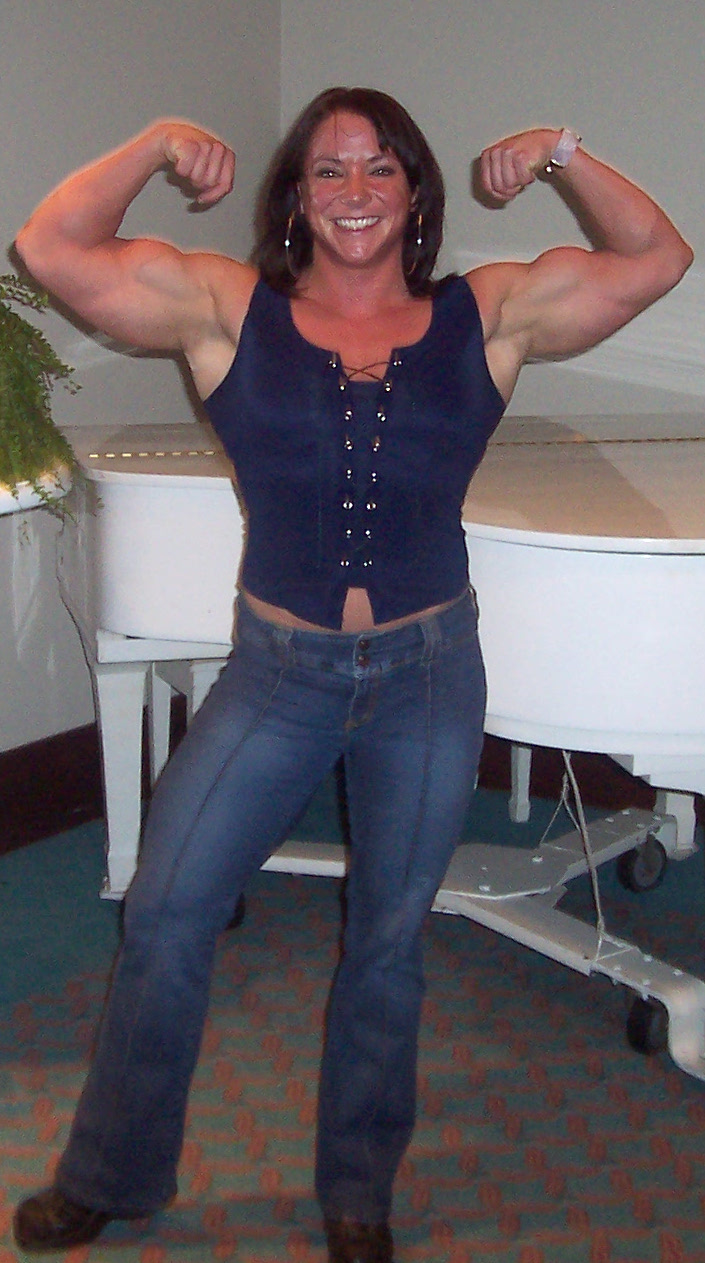
- Dunlap in 2005

Personal info
- Nickname: The Windy City Wonder
- Born: June 26, 1980 (age 44); Kentucky, United States

Best statistics
- Bench press: 225 lb (102 kg)
- Biceps: 15 in (38 cm)
- Calves: 15.5 in (39 cm)
- Contest weight: 140 lb (64 kg)
- Height: 5 ft 4 in (163 cm)
- Off-season weight: 155 lb (70 kg)
- Quads: 23 in (58 cm)

Professional (Pro) career
- Pro-debut: NPC Pittsburgh Championships; 2001
- Best win: IFBB Jan Tana Classic lightweight and overall champion; 2007
- Predecessors: Helle Trevino; Angela Debatin

Sarah Dunlap (born June 26, 1980) is an American bodybuilder. In 2007, she won the Jan Tana Classic in the lightweight and overall categories and was placed ninth at the Ms. Olympia competition. She is a personal trainer and sells fitness equipment for G&G Fitness Equipment in Buffalo, NY.

== Contest history ==
- 2007 IFBB Ms. Olympia – 9th
- 2007 IFBB Jan Tana Classic – 1st
- 2006 IFBB Europa Super Show – 13th
- 2005 IFBB Charlotte Pro – 3rd
- 2005 IFBB New York Pro – 4th
- 2002 NPC Junior National Championships - 1st
- 2002 NPC National Championships - 1st
- 2002 Ms. Pittsburgh Heavyweight 1st Place and Overall winner
- 2001 NPC Pittsburgh Championships - (Middleweight) - 1st
