= Tonia Williams =

New Zealand-British rower

Personal information
- Born: 1966 (age 59–60) Auckland, New Zealand

Sport
- Country: Great Britain
- Sport: Rowing
Medal record
Rowing
Representing Great Britain
World Championships
Gold medal – first place	1993 Racice	Lightweight four
Silver medal – second place	1992 Montreal	Lightweight four
Silver medal – second place	1994 Indianapolis	Lightweight four

Tonia Williams (born 1966) is a New Zealand–British retired rower.

== Career ==
She is the 1993 World Rowing Champion in the lightweight women's four, she won the title with Jane Hall, Alison Brownless and Annamarie Phelps.
