= Betty Viana-Adkins =

Venezuelan bodybuilder

- Professional bodybuilder
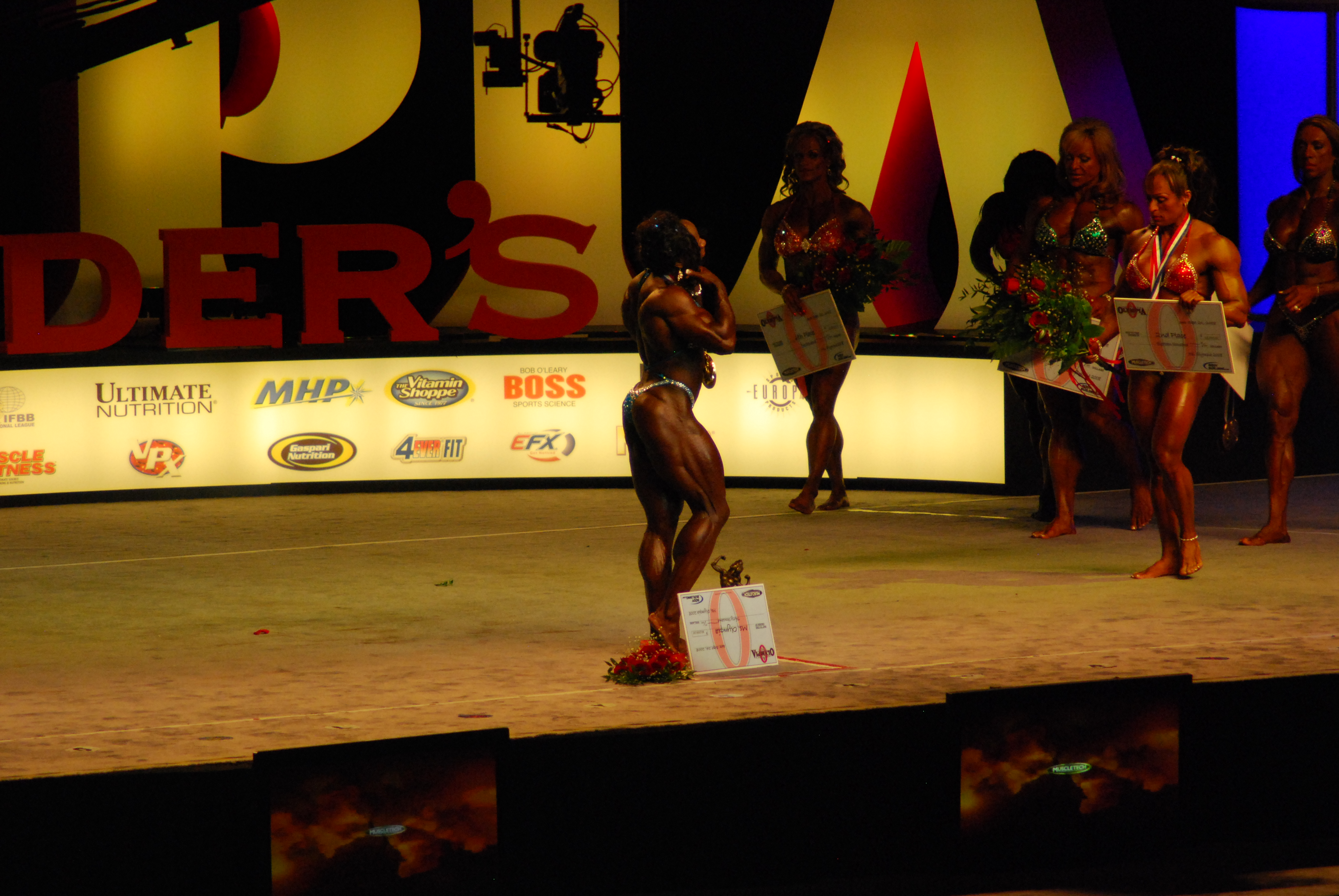
- Betty Viana-Adkins (red bikini and second furthest to the right) on September 26, 2008 during the 2008 Ms. Olympia finals award ceremony.

Personal info
- Born: October 9, 1971 (age 53); Caracas, Capital District, Venezuela

Best statistics
- Height: 5 ft 5 in (1.65 m)
- Weight: In Season: 160 lb (73 kg); Off-Season: 175 lb (79 kg)

Professional (Pro) career
- Pro-debut: IFBB Southwest USA Pro Cup; 2002
- Best win: IFBB Southwest USA Pro Cup champion; 2002
- Predecessor: None
- Successor: None
- Active: Retired 2011 (bodybuilding)

Betty Viana-Adkins (born October 9, 1971) is a Venezuelan professional female bodybuilder.

== Early life and education ==
Betty Viana-Adkins (born Betty Viana) was born in 1971 in Caracas, Venezuela. From 1983 to 1988, she attended high school at Liceo José Manuel Nuñez Ponte in Caracas, Venezuela. In 1993, she graduated from the University Institute of Technology of Venezuela (IUTV) in Caracas, Venezuela. She has a MD in business administration and computer analyst.

== Bodybuilding career ==
=== Amateur ===
In 1986, at the age of 15, Betty and her high school best friend started lifting weights and tried to get in shape like a model. She also did jazz dancing, artistic activities, and fitness. Her husband was a trainer in a gym and he helped her compete in regional contests in Venezuela as an amateur. In 1997, she won the Central American Championship and earned her IFBB pro card.

=== Professional ===
In 2002, Betty Viana-Adkins won her first professional competition, the South West Pro Cup in Texas. This qualified her for her first Olympia in 2002, where she placed seventh. In 2003, she won the lightweight division in the Night of Champions. She would again qualify for the Ms. Olympia in 2003, where she placed fourth. In the 2004 and 2005 Ms. Olympia competitions, she placed in the top six.

At the 2008 Ms. Olympia, Viana-Adkins came in second place, the highest she would ever achieve at a Ms. Olympia. She placed ninth at the 2009 Ms. Olympia. In 2011, she qualified for the 2011 Ms. Olympia, but did not attend.

=== Contest history ===
- 1991 Miss Venezuela - 1st
- 1992 Miss Venezuela - 2nd
- 1994 Miss Venezuela - 1st
- 1994 Iberoamerican Championship - 3rd
- 1994 South American Championship - 1st
- 1995 Miss Venezuela - 1st
- 1996 Miss Venezuela - 1st
- 1997 Miss Venezuela - 1st
- 1997 Central American Championship - 1st (Overall)
- 2002 IFBB South West Pro Cup - 1st (HW and overall)
- 2002 IFBB Ms. Olympia - 7th (HW)
- 2003 IFBB Night of Champions - 1st
- 2003 IFBB Ms. Olympia - 4th (HW)
- 2004 IFBB Ms. International - 6th (HW)
- 2004 IFBB South West Pro Cup - 2nd (HW)
- 2004 IFBB Ms. Olympia - 5th (HW)
- 2005 IFBB Ms. International - 2nd (HW)
- 2007 IFBB Atlantic City Pro - 2nd (HW)
- 2008 IFBB Ms. International - 7th
- 2008 IFBB Atlantic City Pro - 3rd
- 2008 IFBB Ms. Olympia - 2nd
- 2009 IFBB Ms. International - 6th
- 2009 IFBB Ms. Olympia - 9th
- 2011 IFBB Ms. International - 5th

== Physique career ==
=== Contest history ===
- 2013 IFBB PBW Tampa Pro - 14th

== Personal life ==
Betty currently lives in South Miami Beach. She has been married for second time, this time to a woman. She is an Olympics gymnastic and professional contemporary dancer. She is a supporter of the 2014 Venezuelan protests and against President Nicolás Maduro.

== See also ==
- Female bodybuilding
- List of female professional bodybuilders
