= Lisa Aukland =

American bodybuilder

- Professional bodybuilder
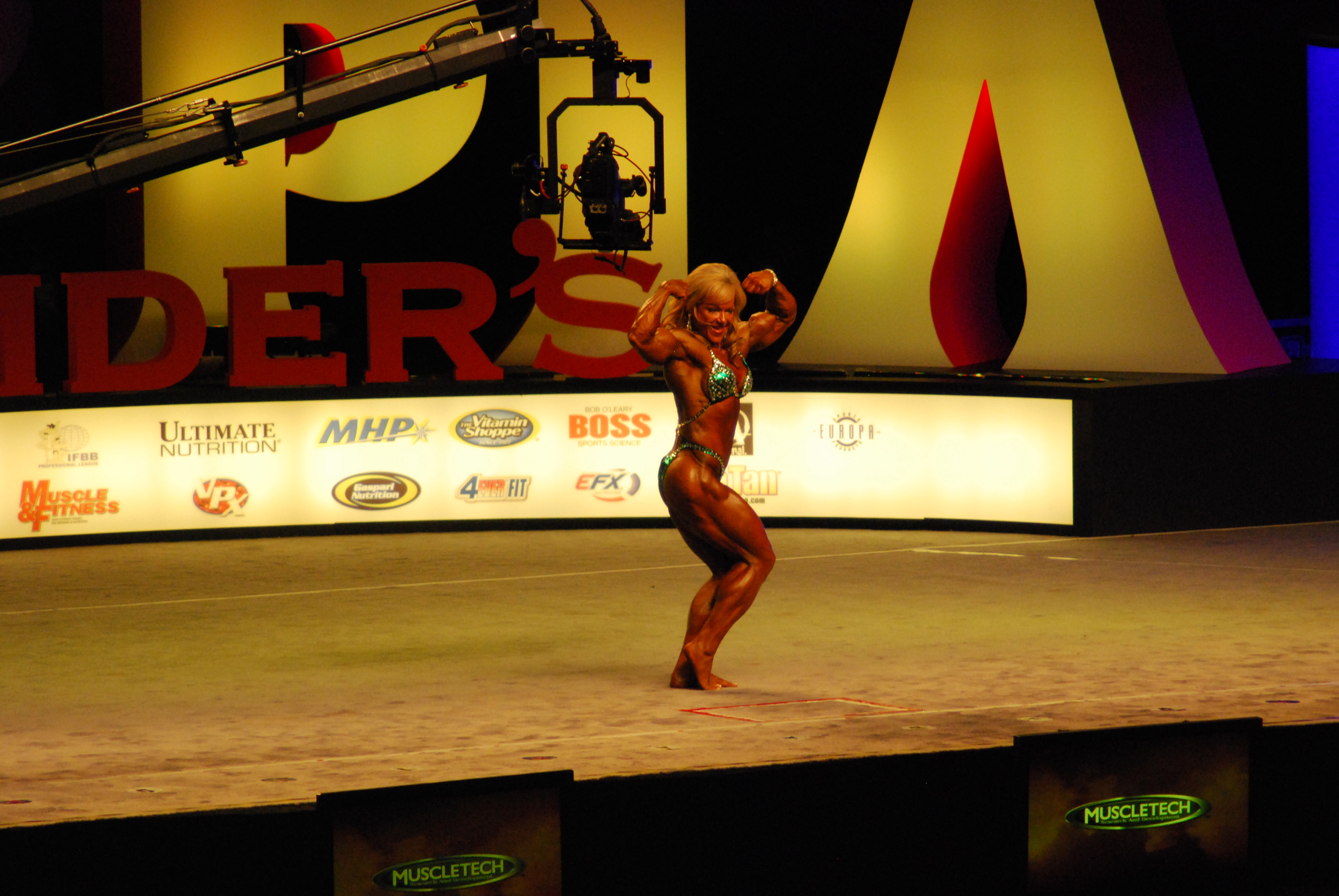
- Lisa Aukland doing a double bicep pose on September 26, 2008, during the 2008 Ms. Olympia finals.

Personal info
- Born: September 16, 1958 (age 67); Bay Shore, Islip, New York, U.S.

Best statistics
- Height: 5 ft 4 in (1.63 m)
- Weight: In Season: 150–155 lb (68–70 kg); Off-Season: 160–169 lb (73–77 kg)

Professional (Pro) career
- Pro-debut: IFBB Ms. International; 2002
- Best win: IFBB Atlantic City Pro champion; 2006, 2007 (heavyweight and overall), 2008, and 2009
- Predecessor: None
- Successor: None
- Active: Retired 2010

Lisa Aukland (born September 16, 1958) is an American professional female bodybuilder and amateur powerlifter.

== Early life and education ==
Lisa Aukland was born in 1958 in Bay Shore, New York. She has two sisters, one older and one younger. Her childhood was typical for a military family, and her parents were very strict. Her father was an officer in the Air Force so her family traveled around a lot and lived on military bases. Her family moved every couple of years to states such as New York, Georgia, Mississippi, Louisiana, and Virginia. Her family also lived in Germany during part of her childhood.

Aukland learned how to make friends quickly. She joined teams on the military bases like football, softball, and bowling. Her dad coached them on their teams. Her mom was a stay-at-home mom for most of her younger years. She taught them how to sew, crochet, knit, cook, clean, and garden. Her dad taught us how to use power tools and fix things, such as how to work on cars. She attended Kecoughtan High School and said she wasn't athletic in high school.

Aukland attended the University of Maryland, Baltimore for a doctorate in pharmacy, which she graduated with in 1999. She attained a Bachelor of Science in pharmacy, magna cum laude at the Virginia Commonwealth University School of Medicine and an associate in science summa cum Laude at Thomas Nelson Community College.

== Powerlifting career ==
=== Amateur ===
Aukland has won every regional and state competition she has entered and set eight world records.

=== Retirement ===
Aukland decided to officially retire from powerlifting competitions in order to concentrate on competing as a professional bodybuilder.

=== Legacy ===
Aukland's best lifts in his powerlifting career were 275 lb (125 kg in the bench, 410 lb (190 kg) deadlift, and 400 lb (180 kg) squat. She competed only in the drug-tested division, and some of those records still hold in Maryland. She was ranked 5th in the 148 lb (67 kg) weight class on "Powerlifting USA" magazine's list of "Top 20 Women Powerlifters in the United States for the year 2000."

=== Contest history ===
YEAR	EVENT	WEIGHT (lbs)	BODY- WEIGHT	PLACING
1991	Quest Bench Press (BP) Contest. Bel Air, MD	Bench-155 lb (70 kg)	130 lb (59 kg)	1st
1992	Quest BP "rep" contest (half bodyweight)	Bench-93 lb (42 kg) reps	131 lb (59 kg)	1st
1993	USPF Maryland State BP Meet	Bench-170 lb (77 kg)	134 lb (61 kg)	1st
May 1994	USPF BP Meet	Bench-195 lb (88 kg)^{1}	132 lb (60 kg)	1st
November 1994	USPF "Fall Open" BP Meet	Bench-210 lb (95 kg)^{1}	137 lb (62 kg)	1st
1995	USPF Maryland State BP Meet	Bench-225 lb (102 kg)^{1}	140 lb (64 kg)	1st
1996	Chesapeake Racquet & Fitness BP Meet	Bench-235 lb (107 kg)	140 lb (64 kg)	1st
1997	AAU Beast of the East BP/DL Meet	Bench-225 lb (102 kg)^{1} Deadlift-325 lb (147 kg)	145 lb (66 kg)	1st
1998	USAPL Eastern Regional BP Competition	Bench-242 lb (110 kg)^{1}	147 lb (67 kg)	1st
April 2000	WPA World Championships full meet: squat, bench press, deadlift	Squat- 400 lb (180 kg)^{1} Bench- 245 lb (111 kg)^{1} Deadlift-285 lb (129 kg)^{1} TOTAL: 1,030 lb (470 kg)	146.5 lb (66.5 kg)	1st
April 8, 2001	APA Capital Bench Press and Deadlift Meet	Bench- 275 lb (125 kg)^{1} Deadlift-410 lb (190 kg)^{1}	157 lb (71 kg)	1st

- ^{1} New record in that organization

== Bodybuilding career ==
=== Amateur ===
Aukland's first bodybuilding show was the Levrone Classic in Glen Burnie, Maryland, in 1995, which she won in the middleweight class and the overall title. Afterwards, she jumped right up to the national level, competing in the NPC Jr. Nationals in 1996 and taking fourth place. She began a successful run at the largest national-level drug-tested bodybuilding show, the NPC Team Universe Championships. She took fourth in 1998, only to come back and win first place and overall winner for the next three years in 1999, 2000, and 2001. After competing in Team Universe and realizing that she was close to looking like some of the women that were winning. When she won that show and then went to the IFBB World Amateur Championship and took a silver medal, she figured she should get serious in bodybuilding.

These wins sent Aukland to compete in the IFBB World Amateur Championships representing the United States women's heavyweight division. She brought home a silver medal from Australia in 1999. At the 2000 World Amateur Championships, she takes 6th place in Warsaw, Poland. During this time she was working full-time and decided to take on a part-time job teaching college level paramedic pharmacology. The 2001 IFBB World Amateur Championships was called off for the American contestants due to an international travel advisory in response to the events of 9/11. In September 2001, she won the heavyweight and overall titles at the IFBB North American Championships in Canada and obtained her pro card.

=== Professional ===
In February 2002, Aukland attended her first IFBB pro competition, the Ms. International. In 2004, she attended her first Ms. Olympia competition. From 2006 to 2009, she would go on to win every overall title at the Atlantic City Pro. With the exception of the 2003 and 2006 Ms. International, she would rank in the top six in every professional competition she attended. She declined to attend the 2009 Ms. International due to a new relationship with a boyfriend. Her coach was Mike Davies.

=== Retirement ===
In 2010, Aukland officially retired from the sport of bodybuilding.

=== Legacy ===
During Auckland's amateur and some of her professional bodybuilding careers, she described herself as a "life-time drug-free athlete," and only competed in drug tested competitions during her amateur career. However, in a later interview in her professional career, when asked about whether she had used performance-enhancing drugs, she declined to answer the question. In 2006, she revived the Most Improved Female Athlete of the Year award at the 2006 Olympia Gala.

=== Contest history ===
- 1995 Levrone Classic - 1st (MW and overall)
- 1996 NPC Jr Nationals - 4th (MW)
- 1998 NPC Team Universe - 4th (HW)
- 1999 IFBB World Amateur Championship - 2nd (HW)
- 1999 NPC Team Universe - 1st (HW and overall)
- 2000 NPC Team Universe - 1st (HW and overall)
- 2000 IFBB World Amateur Championship - 6th (HW)
- 2000 NPC National Championship - 5th (MW)
- 2001 NPC Team Universe - 1st (HW and overall)
- 2001 IFBB North American Bodybuilding Championships - 1st (HW and overall)
- 2002 IFBB Ms. International - 6th (HW)
- 2003 IFBB Ms. International - 8th (HW)
- 2003 IFBB Night of Champions - 5th (HW)
- 2004 IFBB Night of Champions - 4th (HW)
- 2004 IFBB GNC Show of Strength - 3rd (HW)
- 2004 IFBB Ms. Olympia - 6th (HW)
- 2005 IFBB Ms. International - 4th (HW)
- 2006 IFBB Ms. International - 8th
- 2006 IFBB Atlantic City Pro - 1st
- 2006 IFBB Ms. Olympia - 5th
- 2007 IFBB Ms. International - 4th
- 2007 IFBB Atlantic City Pro - 1st (HW and overall)
- 2007 IFBB Ms. Olympia - 4th
- 2008 IFBB Ms. International - 3rd
- 2008 IFBB Atlantic City Pro - 1st
- 2008 IFBB Ms. Olympia - 4th
- 2009 IFBB Atlantic City Pro - 1st
- 2009 IFBB Ms. Olympia - 4th
- 2010 IFBB Ms. International - 4th

== Personal life ==
Aukland currently lives in Baltimore, Maryland. She is of Norwegian-German heritage. In 1992, she joined the Maryland Poison Center and sat for the CSPI exam in 1993. Since 1995, she is certified in Specialist in Poison Information (CSPI) and is a pharmacist.

=== Television appearance ===
Aukland, along with four other fellow female bodybuilders, starred in a MTV Virgin Mobile ringtone commercial shot in New York City on August 8, 2006. In 2011, she starred in a Constellation Energy commercial.
