= Jitka Harazimova =

Czech bodybuilder

- Professional bodybuilder

Personal info
- Nickname: The Loose Cannon
- Born: May 23, 1975 (age 50); Prague, Czech Socialist Republic, Czechoslovak Socialist Republic

Best statistics
- Height: 5 ft 7 in (1.70 m)
- Weight: In Season: 145 lb (66 kg)

Professional (Pro) career
- Pro-debut: IFBB Ms. International; 1997
- Best win: IFBB Charlotte Pro overall and heavyweight champion; 2005
- Predecessor: None
- Successor: None

Jitka Harazimova (née Cervenkova) (May 23, 1975) is a Czech professional bodybuilder.

== Early life and education ==
Jitka Harazimova (born Cervenkova) was born 1975 in Prague, Czech Republic. In school, she played volleyball, and took gymnastics.

== Bodybuilding career ==
=== Amateur career ===
In 1993, Jitka attended her first bodybuilding competition, the Jr. Czech, which she won.

=== Professional career ===
In 1997, she attended her first pro show at the 1997 Ms. International where she placed 4th. Between 1999 and 2005, she took a break from competing and had two children during that time. Prior to break from competing, she was considered a future flag bearer for women's bodybuilding and a potential Ms. Olympia. In 2005, she returned to bodybuilding and won the 2005 Charlotte Pro heavyweight class. At the 2005 Ms. Olympia, she placed 4th, the best in her performance.

=== Competition history ===
- 1993 Jr. Czech - 1st
- 1993 Czech Nationals - 1st (MW and overall)
- 1994 Czech Nationals - 2nd (MW)
- 1997 IFBB Ms. International - 4th
- 1997 IFBB Ms. Olympia - 6th
- 1998 IFBB Ms. International - 5th
- 1998 IFBB Ms. Olympia - 7th
- 1999 IFBB Ms. International - 10th
- 2005 IFBB Charlotte Pro Championships - 1st (HW and overall)
- 2005 IFBB Ms. Olympia - 4th
- 2006 IFBB Ms. International - 4th
- 2006 IFBB Ms. Olympia - 10th

== Personal life ==
Jitka currently lives in Prague, Czech Republic. She currently owns Gym Hara where she is a personal trainer. She is the youngest of six children (three boys / three girls). She currently has four kids (two boys / two girls).
