= Beretta M9 =

Semi-automatic pistol

Pistol, Semiautomatic, 9mm, M9
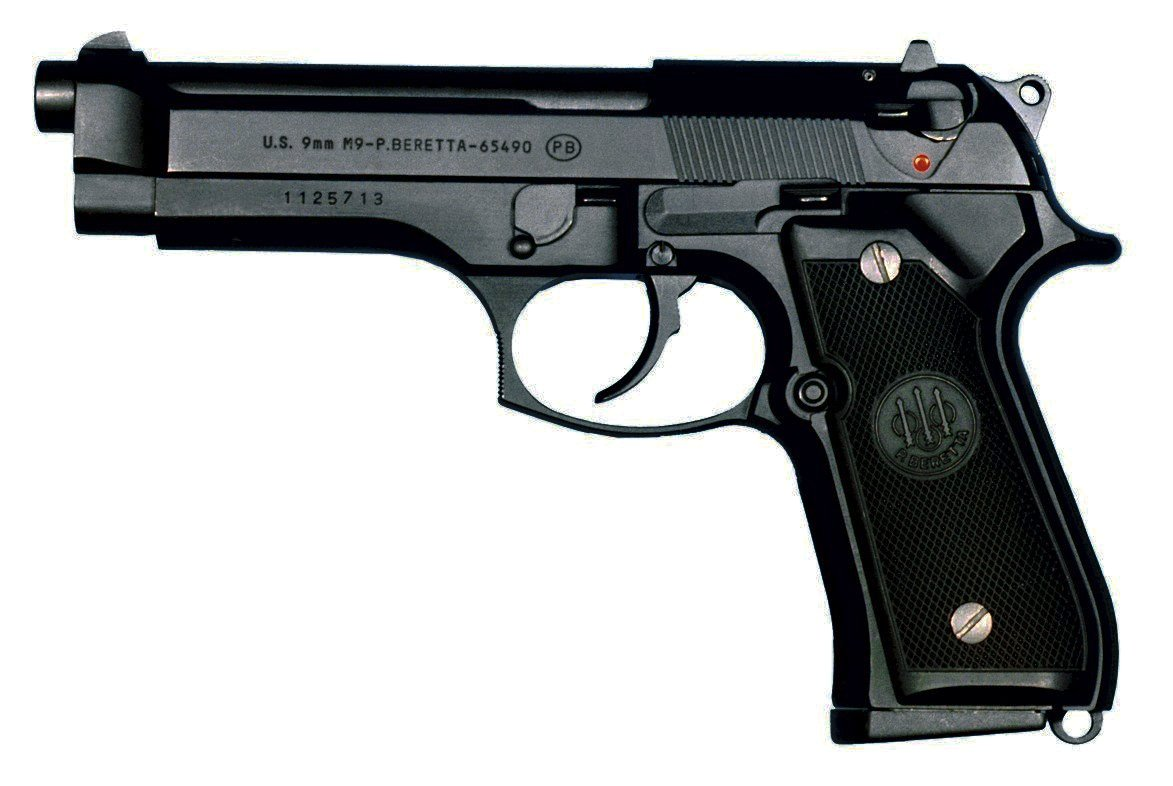
- Type: Semi-automatic pistol
- Place of origin: United States, Italy

Service history
- In service: 1985–present
- Used by: United States Armed Forces
- Wars: Operation Just Cause (U.S. invasion of Panama 1989–1990); Persian Gulf War; Somali Civil War; Kosovo War; War in Afghanistan (2001–2021); Iraq War (U.S. participation 2003–2010); Russo-Ukrainian War – Russian invasion of Ukraine

Production history
- Designed: 1980s
- Manufacturer: Beretta
- Produced: 1985–present
- Variants: M9A1, M9A2 (never released and cancelled) and M9A3 and M9A4

Specifications
- Mass: Unloaded – 34.2 oz (970 g)
- Length: 217 mm (8.5 in)
- Barrel length: 125 mm (4.9 in)
- Width: 38 mm (1.5 in)
- Height: 137 mm (5.4 in)
- Cartridge: 9×19mm Parabellum
- Action: Short recoil, hinged locking piece assisted breechblock
- Muzzle velocity: 381 m/s (1,250 ft/s)
- Effective firing range: 50 m (55 yd)
- Maximum firing range: 100 m (110 yd)
- Feed system: Detachable box magazine; capacities: 8 rounds (restricted); 10 rounds (restricted); 15 rounds (standard); 17 rounds (standard for the A3); 18 rounds (flush high-capacity); 20 rounds (extended); 30 rounds (extended); 32 rounds (extended); 35 rounds (extended); Detachable drum magazine; capacity: 50 rounds
- Sights: Iron sights

The Beretta M9, officially the Pistol, Semiautomatic, 9mm, M9, is the designation for the Beretta 92FS semi-automatic pistol used by the United States Armed Forces. The M9 was adopted by the United States military as their service pistol in 1985.

The 92FS won a competition in the 1980s to replace the M1911A1 as the primary sidearm of the U.S. military, beating many other contenders and only narrowly defeating the SIG Sauer P226 for cost reasons. It officially entered service in 1990. Some other pistols have been adopted to a lesser extent, namely the SIG P228 pistol, and other models remain in limited use.

The M9 was scheduled to be replaced under a United States Army program, the Future Handgun System (FHS), which was merged with the SOF Combat Pistol program to create the Joint Combat Pistol (JCP). The JCP was renamed Combat Pistol (CP), and the number of pistols to be bought was drastically cut back. The U.S. Army, Navy, Air Force, and Marine Corps are replacing the M9 with the SIG Sauer M17 and M18.

== History ==
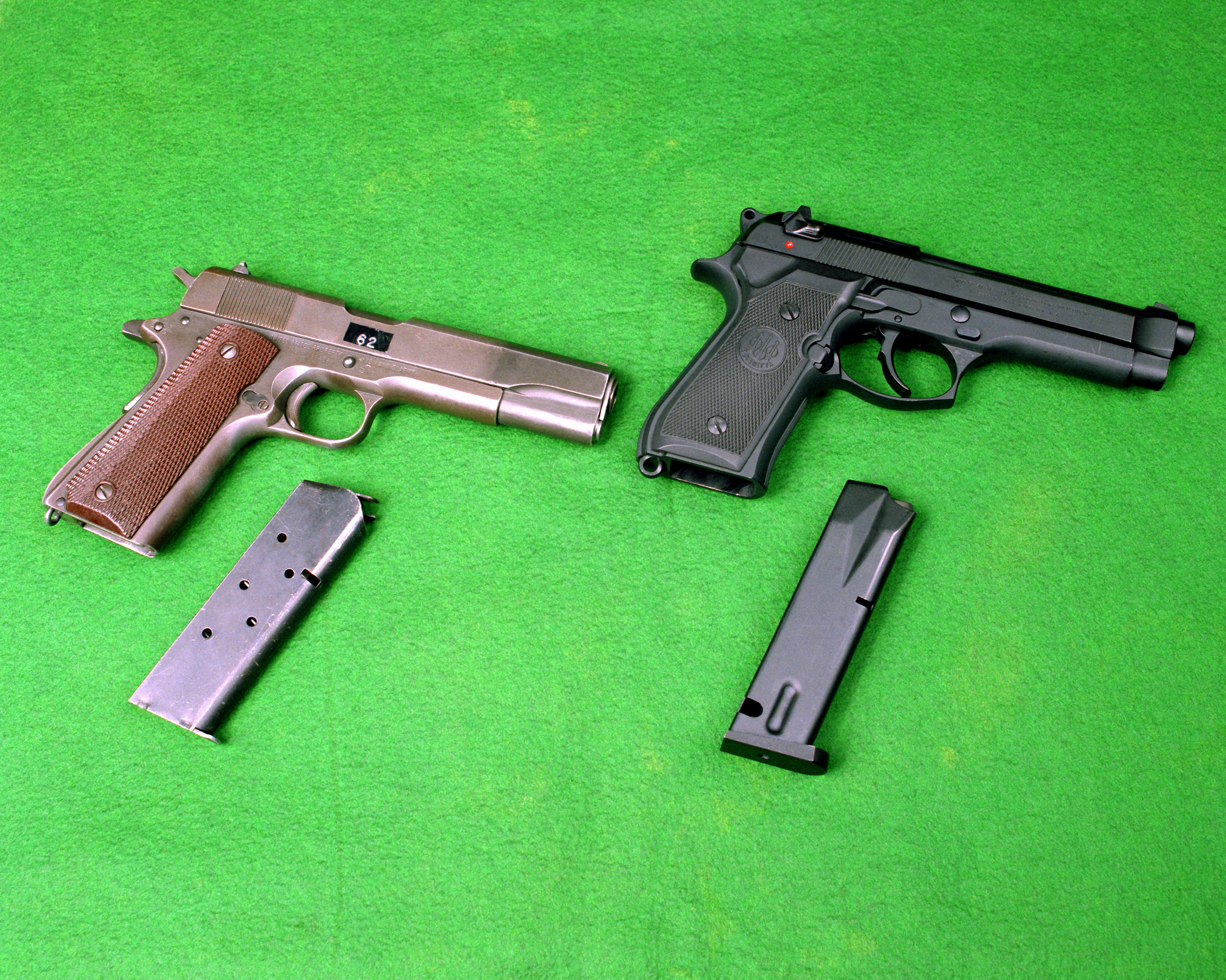
M1911A1 and early M9 with magazines removed

In the 1970s, every branch of the U.S. Armed Forces (except the U.S. Air Force) carried the .45 ACP M1911 pistol. The USAF opted to use .38 Special revolvers, which were also carried by some criminal investigation/military police organizations, USAF strategic missile (ICBM) officer crews, and military flight crew members across all the services when serving in combat zones, or when engaged in nuclear weapons duties.

The Department of Defense then decided to synchronize the weapons of all five branches of the U.S. armed forces. The service members from the ground combat branches found this arrangement highly contentious. However, they recognized that the decision was made for the purpose of eliminating the need to buy replacements for worn-out M1911 frames, and to establish a common NATO pistol round to simplify logistics (in the circumstance of war against the Soviet Union in Europe). In 1979, the Joint Service Small Arms Program began searching for a replacement for the venerable M1911, and the 9×19mm Parabellum round was selected for compliance with a NATO Standardization agreement (STANAG). In 1980, the Beretta 92S-1 design was chosen over entries from Colt, Smith & Wesson, Walther, the Star M28, and various Fabrique Nationale and Heckler & Koch models.

The result, however, was challenged by the US Army, and new tests were done by the Army. In 1984, the trials started again with updated entries from Smith & Wesson, Beretta, SIG Sauer, Heckler & Koch, Walther, Steyr, and Fabrique Nationale. Beretta won this competition, but there was a new trial, the XM10 competition, in 1988. This resulted in two different trials that were more limited, but resulted in the Beretta being chosen—albeit with an updated design.

Starting in 1979 while the pistol selection processes were concurrently underway, the Bianchi International holster company began its development of a multi-functional military holster to be ready for the issuance of a new pistol. The resulting holster was designed by John Bianchi and Richard Nicholas, and designated as the M12. The M12 has served the U.S. Armed Forces well for decades, and was adopted simultaneously with the adoption of the Beretta 92FS in 1985.

The Beretta 92FS performed successfully in a number of survivability trials, which included: exposure to temperature ranges between −40 and 140 °F (−40 and 60 °C); salt water corrosion tests; repeated drops onto concrete; and being buried in sand, mud, and snow. Additionally, the 92FS proved an MRBF (mean rounds before failure) of 35,000 rounds—the number often touted as the equivalent to five or six times the pistol's service life. While this is normally true in European militaries, armed forces of the United States normally subject sidearms to much more extensive use. The Iraq War, which featured frequent urban and room-to-room combat, has required American soldiers to rely more heavily on their pistols.

== Versions ==
=== M9 ===
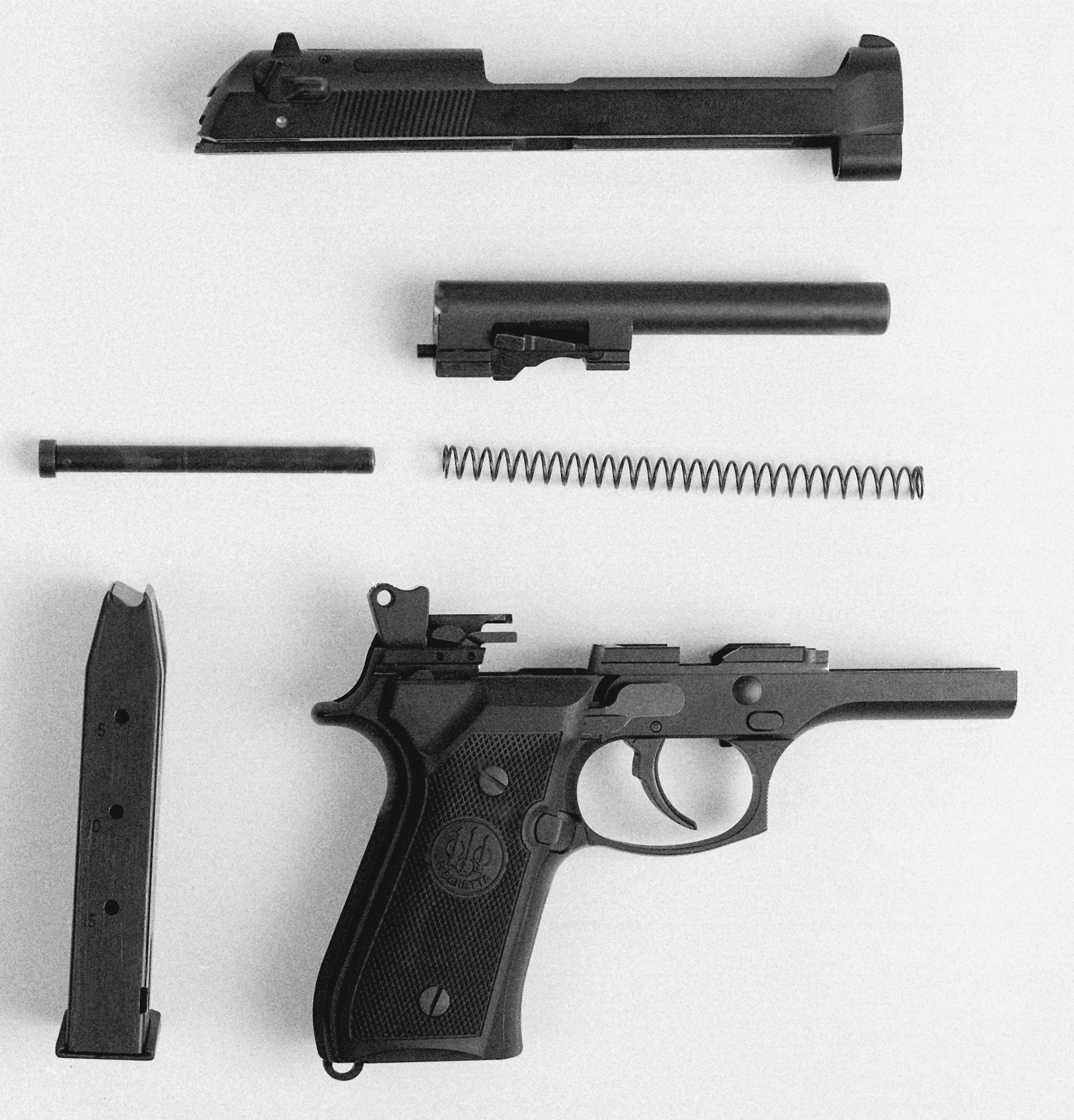
M9 pistol partially field stripped.

The M9 is a short recoil, semi-automatic, single-action / double-action pistol that uses a 15-round staggered box magazine with a reversible magazine release button that can be positioned for either right or left-handed shooters. The M9 is used with the Bianchi M12 Holster, though other holsters are often used. The specific modifications made from the Beretta 92 includes:

- Design of all the parts to make them 100% interchangeable to simplify maintenance for large government organizations.
- Squared off the front of the trigger guard. The squared off trigger guard protects both the gun and the shooter during hand-to-hand combat. Some have suggested that the square guard enables the shooter to grip the front of the trigger guard with the supporting forefinger to enhance aiming; however, firearms trainer and Beretta collaborator Ernest Langdon says that using the forefinger to grip the front of the trigger guard is improper technique.
- Grip with a recurved forward base to aid with aiming.
- Hard chromed barrel bores to protect from corrosion and to reduce wear.
- New surface coating on the slide called Bruniton, which allegedly provides better corrosion resistance than the previous plain blued finish.

It also has an enlarged hammer pin that fits into a groove on the underside of the slide. The main purpose is to stop the slide from flying off the frame to the rear if it cracks. This was added after slide failures were observed in Beretta models with very high round counts during tests (failures later deemed to be caused by defective ammunition used in tests).

The M9 features multiple internal safeties, including a firing pin block that prevents the firing pin from moving without the trigger being pulled, and a firing pin striker that rotates when the safety lever is engaged, preventing the firing pin from being hit even if the hammer falls. The M9 also has an ambidextrous external safety lever, allowing both left and right-handed users to engage or disengage the safety mechanism.

=== M9A1 update ===
The M9 was updated to the M9A1 in 2006. It added—among other things—a one-slot Picatinny rail for mounting lights, lasers, and other accessories to the weapon. The M9A1 has more aggressive front, backstrap checkering, and a beveled magazine well for easier reloading of the weapon. M9A1 pistols are sold with Physical Vapor Deposition (PVD) coated magazines that were developed to better withstand the conditions of sandy environments in the Iraq and Afghanistan wars.

=== M9A3 update ===
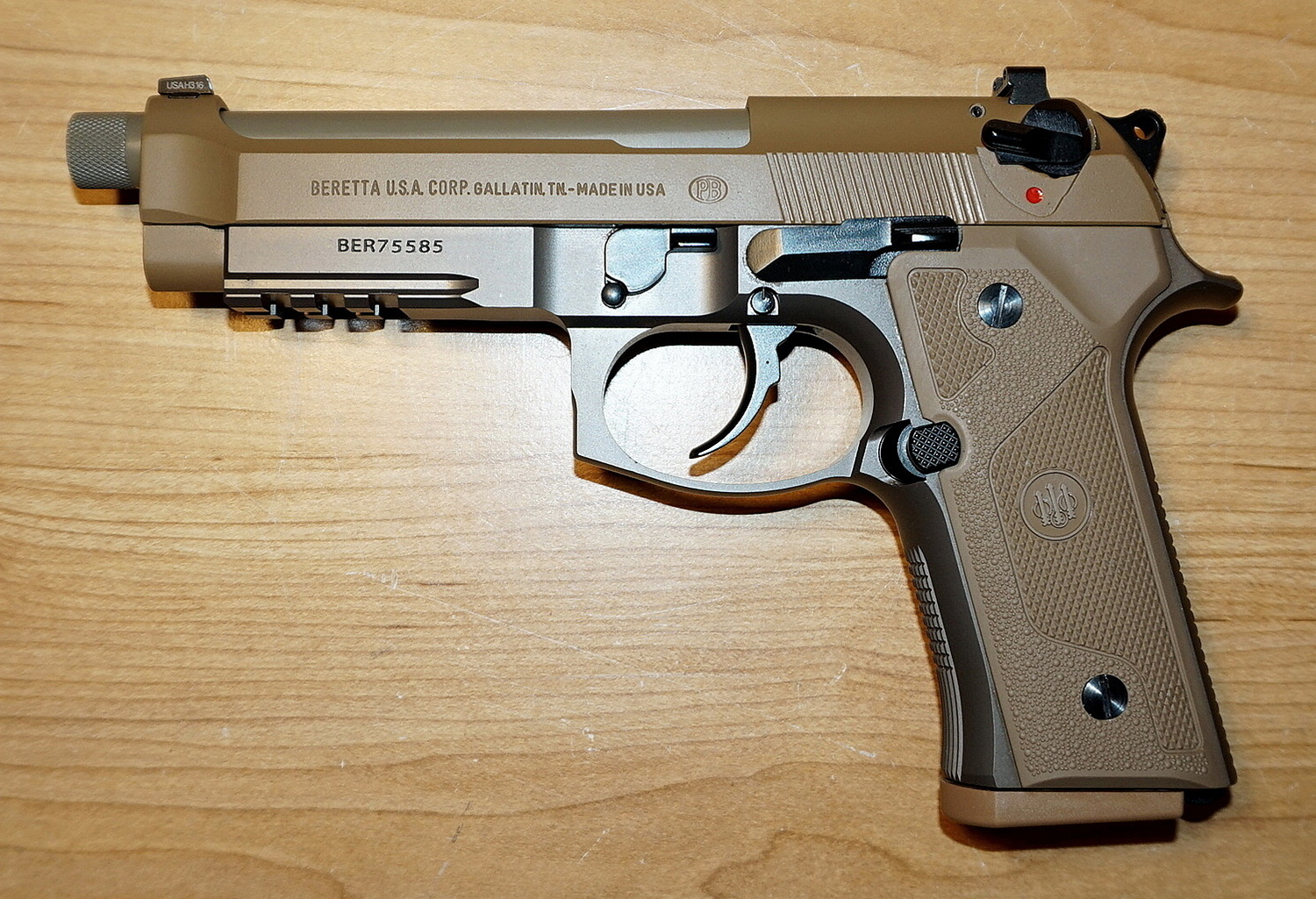
Beretta M9A3 (earth-tone finish)

The M9 was further updated to M9A3 (the M9A2 concept never went into production) in 2015. The main updates to M9A3 were:

- 17-round magazine (a 10-round magazine is also available).
- 3-slot Picatinny rail.
- Multi-colored finish (flat dark earth, black and olive drab green).
- Thinner vertical grip for improved control and less conspicuous concealed carry.
- Removable wrap-around grip that can be swapped between the Vertec-style and 'old' M9 style.
- Removable sights so that users can select the sight's material and construction (e.g., luminescent dot sights for dark situations, or taller sights for use with a suppressor).
- Universal slide, which makes the gun convertible from decocker-safety to decocker-only mode.
- Sand-resistant magazine with bevelled shape for blind reloading.

New production materials also make M9A3 production more cost efficient.

=== M9A4 update ===
In 2021 Beretta introduced the M9A4. Its main features are:

- 18-round magazine (a 10-round and 15-round magazine is also available)
- red-dot optic compatible slide
- dovetailed tritium night sights
- enhanced short reset Xtreme Trigger System
- texturized Vertec-style thin grips
- decocker only, no manual safety

=== M9 22 ===
The M9 22LR is a variant of the M9 in .22 Long Rifle, and features the same operation, controls, and takedown as the M9. The M9 22 is available with 10 and 15-round magazines, removable sights, and interchangeable grip panels which fit the Beretta M9.

== US military ==
=== Adoption ===
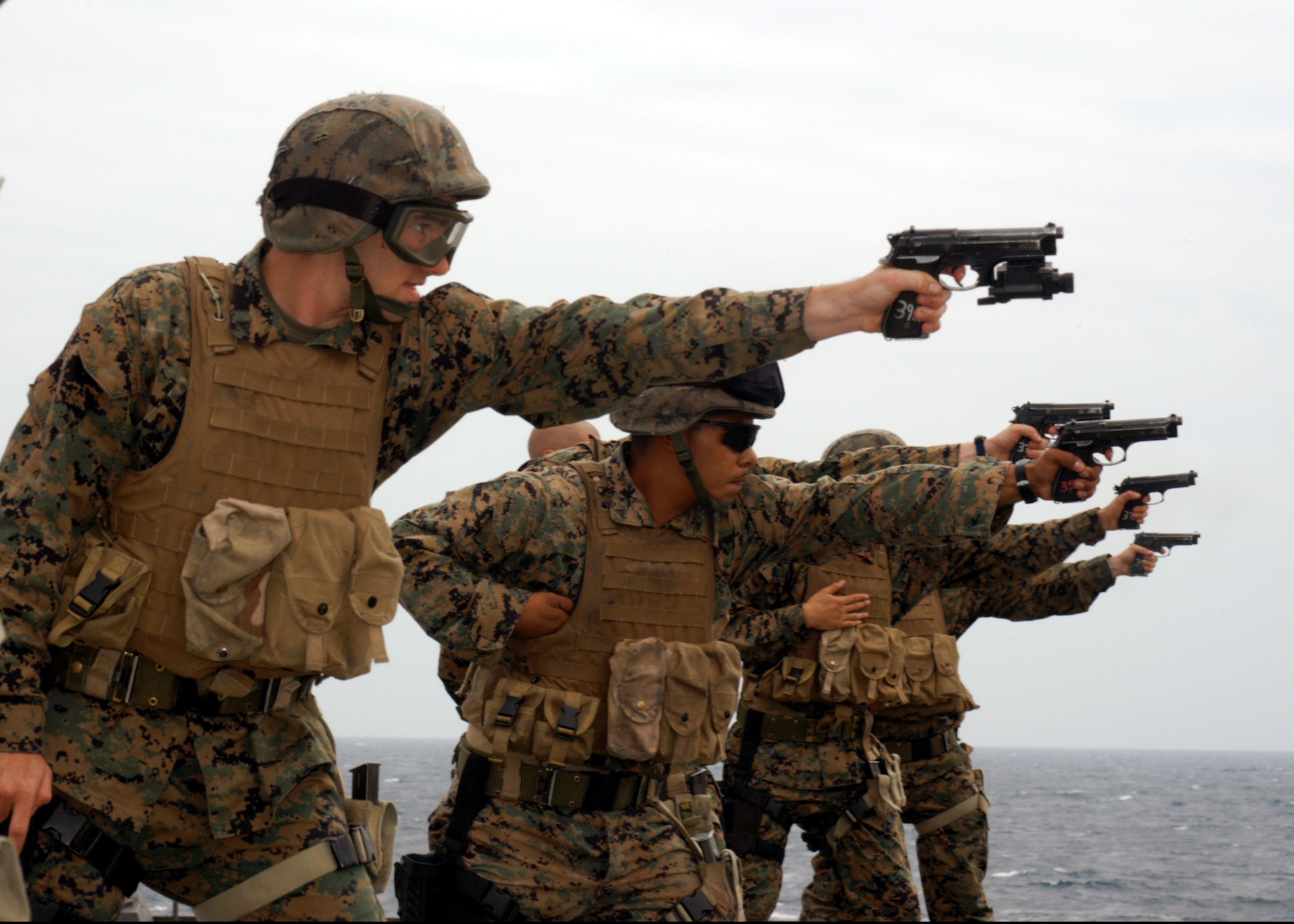
U.S. Marines train with the M9 on board USS Blue Ridge (LCC 19) in March 2005.

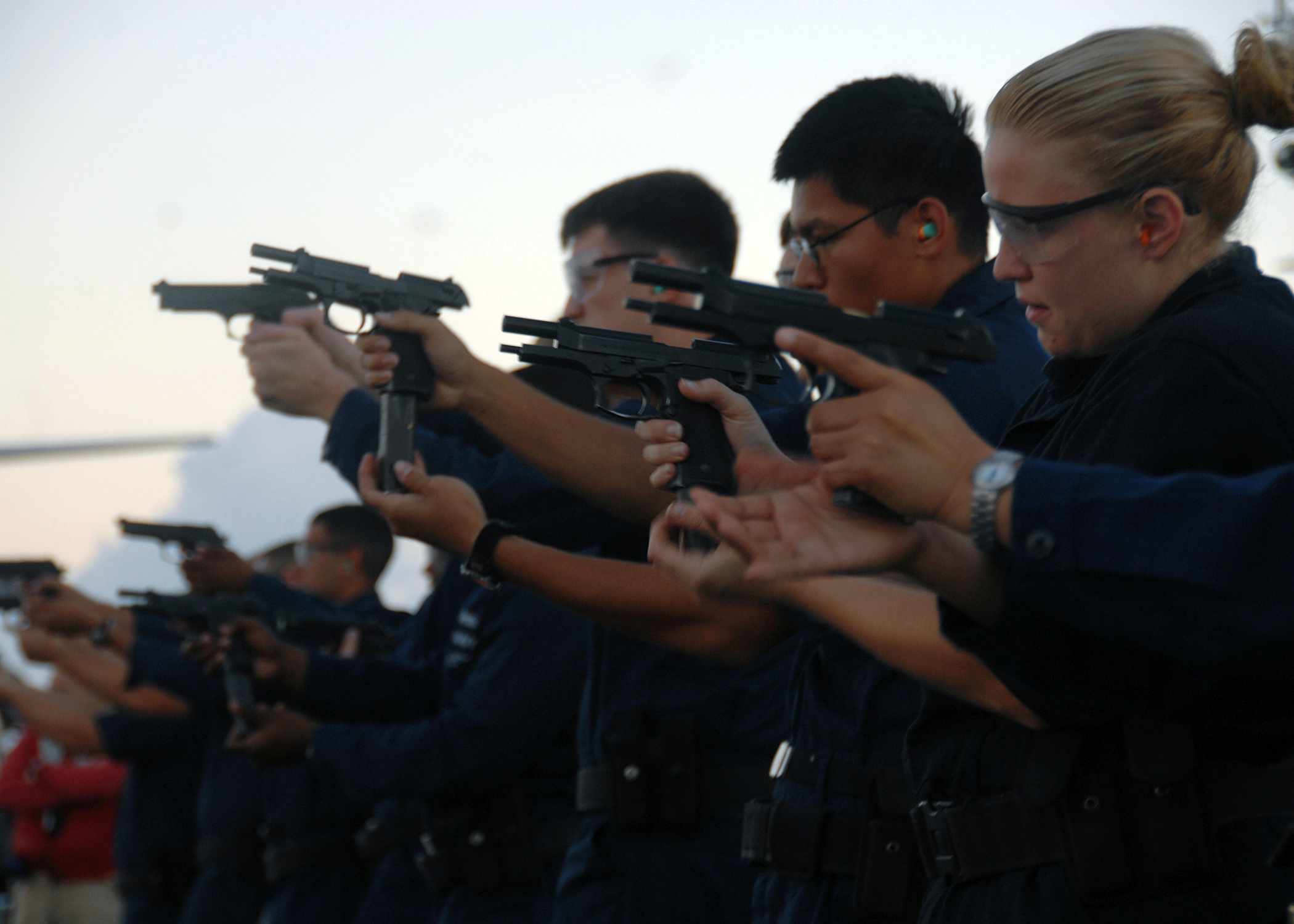
U.S. Navy sailors conduct small arms qualification.

The M9 was the standard sidearm of the United States Navy, United States Army, and the United States Air Force from 1985 to 2017, replacing the Colt M1911A1 in the Army and Navy, and the Smith & Wesson .38 Special in the Air Force. The M9A1 is also seeing limited issue to the United States Marine Corps. A large number of M9s and M9A1s were ordered in 2006. During the 2009 SHOT Show, Beretta announced it had received a US$220 million contract for the delivery of 450,000 M9s and M9A1s to the U.S. military, within five years.

The Beretta M9 General Officer's Model is a special model issued to general officers in the Army and Air Force that replaced the special issue RIA M15 General Officer's Pistol and Colt M1911A1 beginning in 1986. It is identical to the standard M9 sidearm, with standard Bruniton-polymer finish and black composite grips, except it has a "GO"-prefix added to its serial number range, starting with GO-001. It comes with a metal belt buckle that is available in gold metal for Army generals, and silver metal for Air Force generals.

The Marine Corps Times reported plans in July 2007 for all officers below the rank of colonel and all SNCOs to be issued the M4 carbine instead of the M9. The new assignment policy will still assign M9s to Marine colonels and above, and Navy petty officer first class and above.

The United States Coast Guard has replaced most of its M9 pistols with the SIG P229 DAK, though some M9s remain in service with certain units.

The M9 is issued to crewmembers on Military Sealift Command vessels.

On September 30, 2011, Beretta USA announced that the U.S. Army's Foreign Military Sales program has purchased an additional 15,778 Model 92FS pistols for the Afghan military and other U.S. allies. The Model 92FS is the non-U.S. military designation for the M9 pistol.

In September 2012, Beretta USA announced that the U.S. Army had bought 100,000 M9 pistols, and that the M9 "would remain their sidearm for the next five years."

=== Reliability and confidence issues ===
Prior to its widespread adoption by the U.S. military, questions were raised in a 1987 General Accounting Office report after an incident where a slide failure on a Beretta 92SB injured a Naval Special Warfare member, and two more failures were later observed in additional testing. These failures included both military and civilian Beretta models with very high round counts, and after investigation, Beretta deemed them the result of ammunition supplied by the U.S. Army, which exceeded the recommended pressures specified by NATO. Conversely, the U.S. Army concluded that the faults were the result of the low metal toughness present in the Italian-made slides. This event nonetheless provoked a modification in the M9 design to prevent slide failures from causing injuries to the user, after which no further slide fractures were reported.

In December 2006, the Center for Naval Analyses released a report on U.S. small arms in combat. The CNA conducted surveys on 2,608 troops returning from combat in Iraq and Afghanistan over the past 12 months. Only troops who fired their weapons at enemy targets were allowed to participate. 161 troops were armed with M9 pistols, making up 6% of the survey. 58% of M9 users (93 troops) reported they were satisfied with the weapon, which was the lowest satisfaction rate in the survey. 48% of users (77 troops) were dissatisfied with the M9's ammunition. 64% (103 troops) were satisfied with handling qualities, such as size and weight. M9 users had the lowest levels of satisfaction with weapon performance, including: 76% (122 troops) with accuracy, 66% (106 troops) with range, and 88% (142 troops) with rate of fire. 48% of M9 users (77 troops) were dissatisfied with its ability to attach accessories. 26% of M9 users (42 troops) reported a stoppage, and 62% of those that experienced a stoppage said it had a small effect on their ability to clear the stoppage and re-engage their target. Only 45% of M9 users (72 troops) reported their weapon's magazine did not fail to feed completely. 83% (134 troops) did not need their pistols repaired while in theater. 46% (74 troops) were not confident in the M9's reliability, defined as level of soldier confidence their weapon will fire without malfunction, mainly due to difficulty of maintenance. 63% (101 troops) were confident in its durability, defined as level of soldier confidence their weapon will not break or need repair. The M9 had the lowest levels of soldier confidence in reliability and durability. 74% of M9 users offered recommendations for improvements. 26% of requests were for increased caliber or stopping power, with some specifically requesting returning to .45 ACP rounds. 20% of requests were for a new pistol. Other recommendations were for more durable magazines and better grips.

In 2007, soldiers in the field had many concerns with the M9, notably a lack of confidence in its stopping power resulting from the use of the 9mm ball round, a significant factor in military evaluations because the Hague Conventions (1899 and 1907) prohibit use of expanding bullets in warfare between contracting parties. The United States is not a signatory, but generally observes the agreement.

The U.S. military has been criticized for not purchasing magazines from Beretta. The military awarded a contract to Airtronic USA, because the previous manufacturer, Check-Mate Industries, was charging too much per magazine, though Check-Mate magazines are still sometimes issued. Prior to Check-Mate magazines being purchased, the military purchased magazines from the Italian firm Mec-Gar. Airtronic has stated that its M9 magazines will be made similarly to Mec-Gar's, because of reliability problems with Check-Mate magazines.

There were reported failures with the government-contracted 9mm magazines. After extensive testing and testimony given by the troops, it was concluded that the failures were caused by the heavy phosphate finish that were requested in the government contract, combined with the unique environmental conditions in Iraq. After corrections to the government-required specifications for the magazine finish, almost two million new magazines have been distributed without any further malfunctions.

=== Replacement ===
The U.S. Army and Air Force sought to replace their M9s through the Modular Handgun System program. The House Armed Services Committee attempted to terminate the program in favor of upgrading the M9. However, program officials said that buying a new pistol is the better option due to several factors, including: advances in handgun designs; the difficulty in addressing all of the M9's issues; other pistols being less expensive to produce and maintain; and the low confidence soldiers have in the M9. A three-year engineering, manufacturing, and development (EMD) phase began in early 2014. Commercial off-the-shelf pistols were tested for various capabilities, such as: accuracy, dispersion, compatibility, and corrosion resistance under extreme weather and extreme combat conditions. The pistol's service life was expected at 25,000 rounds. The M9 was required to fire 5,000 rounds, while data from Beretta shows the average reliability of the M9 pistol to be 17,500 rounds without a stoppage.

In December 2014, Beretta unveiled its M9A3 pistol upgrade for a separate Army effort to identify Engineering Change Proposals (ECPs) under its existing contract. The company presented the upgrade to improve the M9's performance as a more cost-effective solution, without needing to buy a different handgun. Improvements include: a thin grip with a removable, modular wrap-around grip; MIL-STD-1913 accessory rail; removable front and rear tritium sights; extended and threaded barrel for suppressor use; 17-round sand-resistant magazine; and other small features, all in an earth-tone finish. Later that month, the Army decided not to evaluate the M9A3 in favor of pursuing the MHS program, maintaining that the M9 design does not meet requirements, and a cost-benefit analysis determined the old fleet would cost more to replace and repair than buying a new service pistol. Beretta claims the M9A3's upgraded features address a majority of the complaints, and could be sold for less than the cost of previous M9 versions. The Army formally rejected the M9A3 ECP proposal at the end of January 2015.

On January 19, 2017, it was announced that a customized version of the SIG Sauer P320 had won the United States Army's XM17 Modular Handgun System competition. The full-sized model will be known as the M17, and the carry-sized model will be known as the M18. In an editorial, firearms writer Bob Owens noted that "only the Sig Sauer P320, with a serialized core frame and the ability to swap different grip lengths and slide-barrel combinations, seems to meet the requirements of the RFP among the named designs".

== See also ==
- List of most-produced firearms
