= 2022 Ms. Olympia =

Professional female bodybuilding contest

- Promotion: IFBB Pro League
- Date: 16 December 2022
- Venue: The Venetian Expo & Convention Center (Halls B & C; prejudging); Planet Hollywood Resort & Casino (Zappos Theater; finals)
- City: Paradise, Nevada, United States of America

Event chronology
2021 Ms. Olympia	2022 Ms. Olympia	2023 Ms. Olympia

The 2022 Ms. Olympia was an International Federation of Bodybuilding and Fitness Professional League (IFBB Pro League) professional female bodybuilding contest and part of Joe Weider's Olympia Fitness & Performance Weekend 2022. It was the 38th Ms. Olympia contest to be held.

== Prize money ==
- 1st - $50,000
- 2nd - $20,000
- 3rd - $12,000
- 4th - $7,000
- 5th - $6,000

Total: $95,000

== Rounds ==
- Prejudging round: Contestants were evaluated based on symmetry, muscularity, and conditioning, focusing on overall physique balance, proportion, muscle size, and definition.
- Finals round: This round included the posing routines, where contestants showcased their creativity, presentation, and stage presence. The final posedown allowed the contestants to be directly compared before determining the final placements.

== Callouts ==
=== Prejudging ===
1. Theresa Ivancik, Michaela Aycock, Angela Yeo, Andrea Shaw, Helle Trevino, Margie Martin, Branka Njegovec and Alcione Barreto
2. Irene Andersen, MayLa Ash, Chelsea Dion, Mona Poursaleh, Michelle Jin and Donna Salib
3. Lisa Kudrey, Reshanna Boswell, Leyvina Barros, Asha Hadley, Eva Montgomery and Danielle Willis
4. Michelle Jin, Theresa, Michaela, Branka, Chelsea and Alcione
5. Helle, Angela, Andrea and Margie

=== Finals ===
1. Danielle, Asha, Reshanna, Lisa and Eva
2. MayLa, Irene, Mona and Donna
3. Michelle, Chelsea, Michaela, Branka, Theresa and Alcione
4. Margie, Andrea, Angela and Helle

== Results ==
- 1st - Andrea Shaw
- 2nd - Angela Yeo
- 3rd - Helle Trevino
- 4th - Margie Martin
- 5th - Branka Njegovec
- 6th - Michaela Aycock
- 7th - Theresa Ivancik
- 8th - Alcione Barreto
- 9th - Chelsea Dion
- 10th - Michelle Jin
- 11th - MayLa Ash
- 12th - Mona Poursaleh
- 13th - Irene Andersen
- 14th - Donna Salib
- 15th - Leyvina Barros
- 16th - Reshanna Boswell, Stephanie Flesher, Asha Hadley, Lisa Kudrey, Eva Montgomery and Danielle Willis

Comparison to previous Olympia results:

- Same - Andrea Shaw
- -1 - Helle Trevino
- -1 - Margie Martin
- Same - Michaela Aycock
- Same - MayLa Ash
- -8 - Mona Poursaleh
- -8 - Irene Andersen
- -1 - Reshanna Boswell

=== Scorecard ===
No	Name	Country	Judging	Finals	Total	Place
1	Irene Andersen	Sweden			65	13
2	MayLa Ash	US			55	11
3	Michaela Aycock	US			29	6
4	Alcione Santos Barreto	Brazil			42	8
5	Leyvina Rodrigues Barros	Brazil			76	15
6	Reshanna Boswell	US			80	16
7	Chelsea Dion	US			43	9
8	Stephanie Flesher	US			80	16
9	Asha Hadley	US			80	16
10	Theresa Ivancik	US			35	7
11	Michelle Jin	US			50	10
12	Lisa Kudrey	Canada			80	16
13	Margie Martin	US			20	4
14	Eva Montgomery	US			80	16
15	Branka Njegovec	Croatia			26	5
16	Mona Poursaleh	Canada			59	12
17	Donna Salib	US			70	14
18	Helle Trevino	US			15	3
19	Danielle Willis	US			80	16
20	Angela Yeo	US			10	2
21	Andrea Shaw	US			5	1

== Attendees ==
- 6th Ms. Olympia attended - Helle Trevino
- 4th Ms. Olympia attended - Margie Martin
- 3rd Ms. Olympia attended - Irene Andersen, MayLa Ash, Reshanna Boswell and Andrea Shaw
- 2nd Ms. Olympia attended - Michaela Aycock, Asha Hadley, Theresa Ivancik and Mona Poursaleh
- 1st Ms. Olympia attended - Alcione Barreto, Leyvina Barros, Chelsea Dion, Stephanie Flesher, Michelle Jin, Lisa Kudrey, Eva Montgomery, Branka Njegovec, Donna Salib, Danielle Willis and Angela Yeo

== Notable events ==
- Andrea Shaw won her third Ms. Olympia consecutively, beating Rachel McLish's record two Ms. Olympia wins and tying with Larry Scott, Jay Culter and Mamdouh Elssbiay's record two consecutive Mr. Olympia wins, along with Franco Columbu's record two overall Mr. Olympia wins.
- The 2022 Ms. Olympia posedown returned to having all contestants posing in it.
- 2022 Ms. Olympia contestant Irene Andersen, at the age of 56, was the oldest contestant to ever attend a Ms. Olympia.

== 2022 Ms. Olympia qualified ==
Name	Country	How qualified
Andrea Shaw	(United States)	2021 Ms. Olympia – 1st
Helle Trevino	(United States)	2021 Ms. Olympia – 2nd
Margie Martin	(United States)	2021 Ms. Olympia – 3rd
Nadia Capotosto	(Italy)	2021 IFBB Pro League Wings of Strength Romania Muscle Fest Pro Women's Bodybuilding – 1st
MayLa Ash	(United States)	2021 IFBB Pro League Toronto Pro Women's Bodybuilding – 1st
Eva Montgomery	(United States)	2022 IFBB Pro League Vancouver Island Showdown Women's Bodybuilding – 1st
Theresa Ivancik	(United States)	2022 IFBB Pro League Indy Pro Women's Bodybuilding – 1st
Donna Salib	(United States)	2022 IFBB New York Pro Women's Bodybuilding – 1st
Lisa Kudrey	(Canada)	2022 IFBB Pro League Toronto Pro Supershow Women's Bodybuilding – 1st
Danielle Willis	(United States)	2022 IFBB Pro League Omaha Pro Women's Bodybuilding – 1st
Reshanna Boswell	(United States)	2022 Wings of Strength & Fit Body Fusion IFBB Pro League Yamamoto Nutrition Puerto Rico Women's Bodybuilding – 1st
Leyvina Barros	(Brazil)	2022 IFBB Pro League Musclecontest Brazil Women's Bodybuilding – 1st
Branka Njegovec	(Croatia)	2022 IFBB Pro League Mr Big Evolution Women's Bodybuilding – 1st
Michaela Aycock	(United States)	2022 IFBB Pro League Lenda Murray Atlanta Pro Women's Bodybuilding – 1st
Angela Yeo	(United States)	2022 Fit Body Fusion IFBB Pro League Wings of Strength Chicago Pro Open Women's Bodybuilding – 1st
Chelsea Dion	(United States)	2022 Wings of Strength & Fit Body Fusion IFBB Pro League Yamamoto Nutrition Cup Tampa Women's Bodybuilding – 1st
Asha Hadley	(United States)	2022 IFBB Pro League Lenda Murray Savannah Pro Women's Open Bodybuilding – 1st
Alcione Barreto	(Brazil)	2022 IFBB Pro League Europa Pro Women's Bodybuilding – 1st

=== Points standings ===
Ranking ^{1}	Name	Country	Points
1	Stephanie Flesher	(United States)	23
2	Michelle Jin	(United States)	22
3	Mona Poursaleh	(Canada)	19
4	Sherry Priami	(United States)	17
5	Yesenia Speck	(Spain)	16
5	Irene Andersen	(Sweden)	16
7	Sheena Ohlig	(United States)	14
8	Leah Dennie	(United States)	11
8	Tiana Flex	(South Africa)	11
10	Michelle Brent	(United States)	7
10	Claudia Mocciaro	(Italy)	7
12	Tananarive Huie	(Canada)	6
12	Keisha Oliver	(United States)	6
12	Gisela Chan	(China)	6
12	Julia Foery	(Switzerland)	6
12	Saqweta Barrino	(United States)	6
12	Victoria Dominguez	(United States)	6
12	Elisama Zorzetto	(Brazil)	6
19	Anastasia Leonova	(Russia)	5
19	Erika Dancova	(United States)	5
19	Gabriela Pena	(United States)	5
19	Vanesa Lloria	(Spain)	5
23	Anastasia Korableva	(Russia)	4
23	Kelly LeFevre	(United States)	4
23	Christina Bryant	(United States)	4
26	Felicia Spatarescu	(Spain)	3
26	Ivana Dvorakova	(Czech Republic)	3
26	Jeanie Welker	(United States)	3
26	Isabelle Turell	(United States)	3
26	Mariana Guayara	(Colombia)	3
31	Takeela Reddrick	(United States)	2
32	Sonia Pasani	(Spain)	1
32	Jade Beverly	(United States)	1
32	Eva Dunbar	(United States)	1

^{1}In the event of a tie, the competitor with the best top five contest placings will be awarded the qualification. If both competitors have the same contest placings, than both will qualify for the Olympia.
