= List of convention centers in the Las Vegas Valley =

List of convention facilities in Las Vegas
Name	Settlement	Size		Meeting space		Own building	Main spaces	Comments
Encore Las Vegas	Paradise			60,000 sq ft	5,600 m^{2}	No
JW Marriott Convention Center	Las Vegas	65,000 sq ft	6,000 m^{2}	100,000 sq ft	9,300 m^{2}	Yes	3
Westgate Las Vegas	Winchester	200,000 sq ft	19,000 m^{2}			Yes	3+
Wynn Las Vegas	Paradise			200,000 sq ft	19,000 m^{2}	No	9
Caesars Palace	Paradise			300,000 sq ft	28,000 m^{2}	No
MGM Grand Convention Center	Paradise	380,000 sq ft	35,000 m^{2}			Yes
Aria Convention Center	Paradise	400,000 sq ft	37,000 m^{2}			Yes	42
Cashman Center	Las Vegas	483,000 sq ft	44,900 m^{2}			Yes	1
Caesars Forum	Paradise	550,000 sq ft	51,000 m^{2}			Yes
Mandalay Bay Convention Center	Paradise	2,100,000 sq ft	200,000 m^{2}			Yes	1
Venetian Expo	Paradise	1,200,000 sq ft	110,000 m^{2}			Yes	1
Las Vegas Convention Center	Winchester	4,600,000 sq ft	430,000 m^{2}			Yes	4
