= Mandalay Bay Convention Center =

Event venue in Nevada, United States

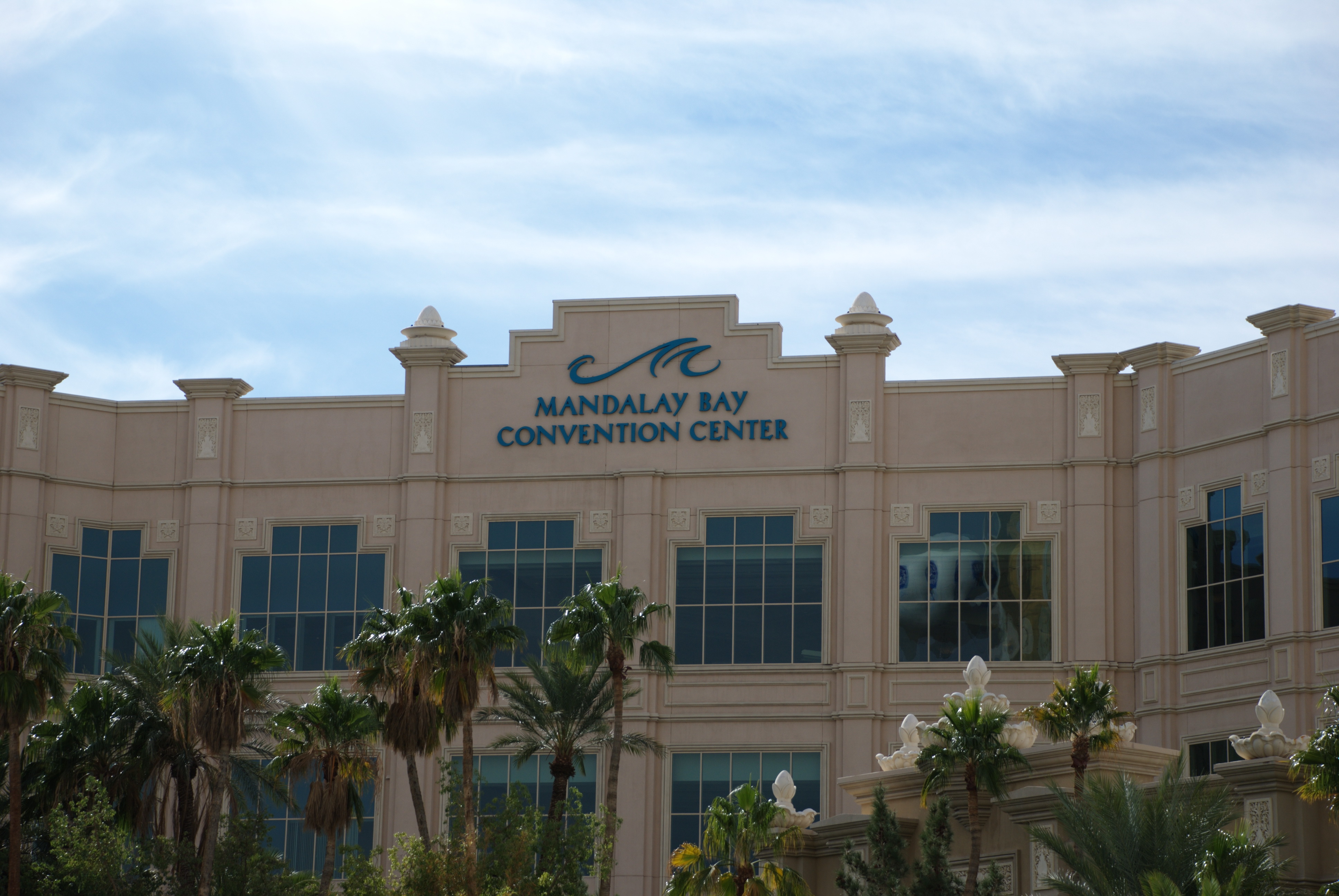
- Mandalay Bay Convention Center in 2009
- Interactive map of Mandalay Bay Convention Center
- Address: 3950 South Las Vegas Boulevard
- Location: Paradise, Nevada
- Coordinates: 36°5′19″N 115°10′39″W
- Owner: MGM Resorts International
- Capacity: Detailed venue capacity: Breakers: 1,621; Lagoon: 2,549; Islander: 3,351; South Pacific: 4,728; South Seas: 5,115; Oceanside: 6,792; Mandalay Bay Ballroom: 9,408

Construction
- Built: 2001–03
- Opened: January 6, 2003
- Renovated: 2016, 2022–2024
- Expanded: 2014–15
- Cost: $236 million

Website
- Mandalay Bay Convention Center

Mandalay Bay Convention Center is attached to the Mandalay Bay resort, located on the Las Vegas Strip in Paradise, Nevada. The 2,100,000 sq ft (200,000 m^{2}) facility is owned and operated by MGM Resorts International. It is among the largest convention centers in the U.S.

It was developed by original owner Mandalay Resort Group, at a cost of $236 million. Construction began in 2001, but was temporarily halted due to the economic impact of the September 11 attacks. The Mandalay Bay Convention Center opened on January 6, 2003, with 1,500,000 sq ft (140,000 m^{2}). MGM acquired the facility two years later. An expansion was finished in 2015, and renovations concluded the following year.

== History ==
In April 2001, Mandalay Resort Group announced plans to build a convention center for its Mandalay Bay resort, located on the Las Vegas Strip. The facility would occupy 16.5 acres located southwest of Mandalay Bay. The resort already had 190,000 sq ft (18,000 m^{2}) of convention and meeting space, and the new facility would add 1,800,000 sq ft (170,000 m^{2}). The addition would beat out the nearby Venetian resort and its Sands Expo, which had a combined total of 1,600,000 sq ft (150,000 m^{2}). In addition to Mandalay Bay, the convention center would attract business from the Luxor and Excalibur resorts, also built by Mandalay Resort Group and located directly north. The facility was originally expected to be finished in mid-2002. Construction began in June 2001, but was subsequently put on hold for nearly six months, due to the economic impact of the September 11 attacks. The facility was topped out on July 11, 2002.

The $236 million Mandalay Bay Convention Center opened on January 6, 2003, with 1,500,000 sq ft (140,000 m^{2}) of space. It was among the largest convention centers in the U.S., and the second largest local facility, surpassed only by the Las Vegas Convention Center. Its first event was the Aqua Show, which focused on the pool and spa industry. The convention center has three floors, and the layout allows the facility to be divided into 75 rooms. The convention center failed to meet expectations initially. MGM Mirage acquired the facility and Mandalay Bay in 2005, and convention bookings improved under the new ownership. Convention business makes up a significant portion of the resort's revenue.

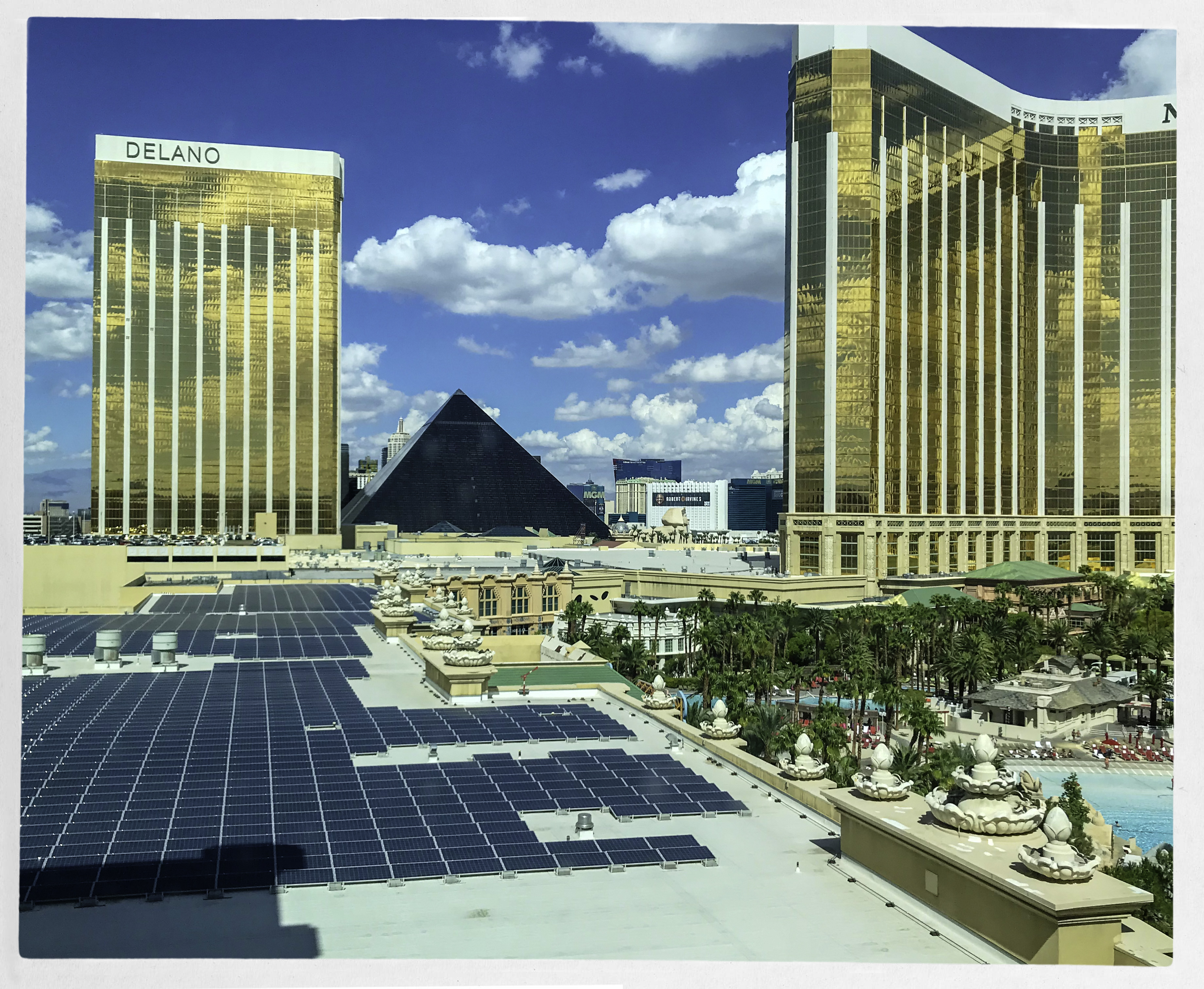
Solar panels atop the convention center, 2018

In 2013, Mandalay Bay partnered with NRG Energy to add 21,324 solar panels on the facility's roof, capable of supporting up to 20 percent of the resort's energy needs.

A $66 million expansion of the convention center was announced in April 2014, adding 350,000 sq ft (33,000 m^{2}) of exhibit space and 900 additional underground parking spaces. Construction began in October 2014, and the addition opened in August 2015, bringing the facility to 2,000,000 sq ft (190,000 m^{2}). Renovations to the existing facilities concluded in January 2016, with second-floor space converted into the 70,000 sq ft (6,500 m^{2}) Oceanside Ballroom. The convention center includes three kitchens which provide catering for events.

A $100 million renovation, including technological updates, took place from 2022 to 2024.

== See also ==
- List of convention centers in the Las Vegas Valley
