= Theresa Ivancik =

American bodybuilder

Theresa M. Ivancik
- Professional bodybuilder
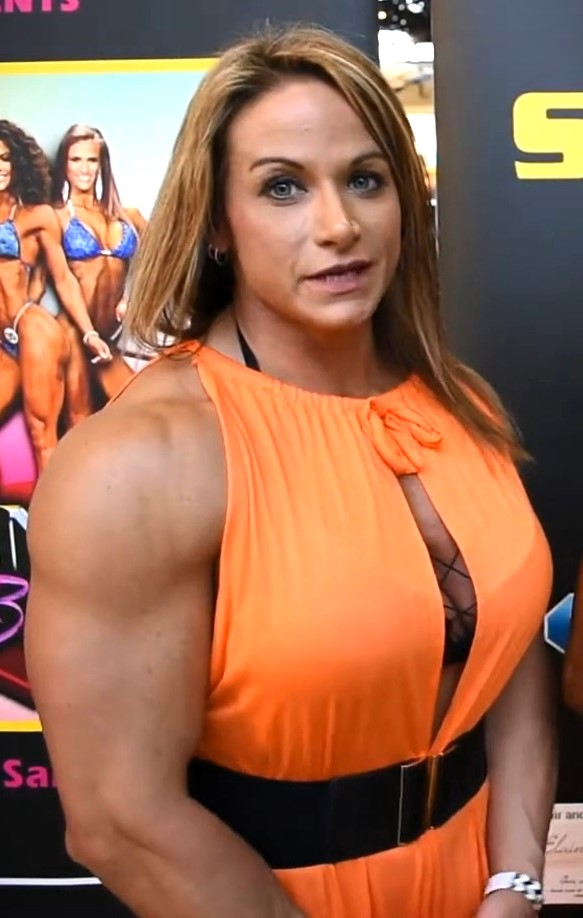
- Invancik at the 2021 NPC North American Championship

Personal info
- Born: September 2, 1983 (age 43)

Best statistics
- Height: 5 ft 6 in (1.68 m)
- Weight: On-season: 160 lb (73 kg); Off-season: 175–183 lb (79–83 kg)

Professional (Pro) career
- Pro-debut: IFBB Professional League (IFBB) Norfolk Pro; 2017
- Best win: IFBB Chicago Pro champion & best poser award; 2020
- Active: Since 2007; Professional Athlete since 2016 (women's bodybuilding)

Theresa M. Ivancik (born September 2, 1983) is an American professional bodybuilder and former professional physique and figure contestant. She is currently ranked as the 7th best professional female bodybuilder.

== Early life ==
Ivancik grew up an active child. She got her first job at 16 years old. She would do runs on her break and did Tae Bo after work. She was on the sequinette dance team at the Butler Area Senior High School, which she graduated in 2001.

== Figure career ==
In 2001, while Ivancik was under house arrest for driving under the influence, she started messing around with the old Weider system in the basement of her parents house. She stumbled across an Oxygen magazine, where saw pictures from a competition and decided she wanted to look like that. She went to the local gym and started training. After asking about competing, she was directed to Jeff Harlan, owner of his own gym. He told she had to eat to complete, but she didn't want to due to suffering from bulimia, so she tried to figure it out herself. She started training on her own in her basement in 2006. She did her first three shows by herself. Then she got back with Jeff Harlan as her personal trainer and lover and began prepping for the 2008 National Physique Committee (NPC) Pittsburgh. She later decided to quit figure because she was too big for it.

Contest history

- 2007 National Physique Committee (NPC) Pennsylvania Championships - 1st
- 2007 NPC Mid Atlantic Grand Prix - 2nd
- 2008 NPC Upper Ohio Valley - 3rd
- 2008 NPC Pittsburgh - 6th

== Bodybuilding career ==
=== Amateur ===
After the 2008 National Physique Committee (NPC) Pittsburgh, Ivancik decided to move up to bodybuilding. She took off 2009 off so she could eat and grow. This different style of training and nutrition was addicting. In January 2010, she entered her first bodybuilding show, the 2010 NPC Pittsburgh. She also took her 83-year-old grandfather, Pete Ivancik, with her to compete for the first time in Mr. Pittsburgh masters over 80 class, which he won. Soon after, she began taking performance-enhancing drugs, going from 120 lb (54 kg) to 180 lb (82 kg) in a few months. At the 2016 NPC Nationals, she placed 1st in the heavyweight category, earning her IFBB Pro card. In 2016, she hired amateur bodybuilder Brian Hoydic as her coach.

=== Professional ===
In 2017, Ivancik placed second at her pro-debut at the 2017 IFBB Norfolk Pro contest. This qualified her for her first Rising Phoenix World Championships in 2017, placing sixteenth. In 2019, she won her first IFBB Pro League show at the 2019 IFBB Norfolk Pro, which qualified her for the 2019 IFBB Rising Phoenix World Championships, where she placed sixth and got fifth in the best poser award category. In 2020, she won first place and the best poser award at the 2020 IFBB Chicago Pro, which qualified her for the 2020 IFBB Ms. Olympia. She was invited to the 2020 IFBB Rising Phoenix World Championships and placed seventh and won the best poser award. She attended her first Ms. Olympia in 2020, where she placed fourteenth. In 2022, she placed 1st at the IFBB Indy Pro, which qualified her for the 2022 IFBB Ms. Olympia, where she placed seventh. Her current coach is professional bodybuilder Branden Ray. She is currently working on a documentary film about women's bodybuilding called Beyond Bodybuilding.

=== Contest history (amateur) ===
- 2010 National Physique Committee (NPC) Pittsburgh - 3rd Heavyweight (HW)
- 2011 NPC Pittsburgh - 2nd (HW)
- 2011 NPC Junior Nationals - 5th (HW)
- 2011 NPC Bill Grant Classic - 1st (HW & overall)
- 2013 NPC Northern Americans - 14th (HW)
- 2014 NPC Pittsburgh - 2nd (HW)
- 2014 NPC USA Championships - 3rd (HW)
- 2015 NPC IFBB Professional League (IFBB) North American - 1st (HW)
- 2015 NPC Nationals - 2nd (HW)
- 2016 NPC USA Championships - 2nd (HW)
- 2016 NPC Nationals - 1st (HW)

=== Contest history (professional) ===
- 2017 IFBB Norfolk Pro - 2nd
- 2017 IFBB Rising Phoenix World Championships - 16th
- 2019 IFBB Norfolk Pro – 1st
- 2019 IFBB Rising Phoenix World Championships - 6th & 5th best poser award (BPA)
- 2020 IFBB Chicago Pro – 1st & best poser award
- 2020 IFBB Rising Phoenix World Championships - 7th & BPA
- 2020 IFBB Ms. Olympia - 14th
- 2022 IFBB Indy Pro - 1st
- 2022 IFBB Ms. Olympia - 7th
- 2023 IFBB Tampa Pro - 3rd
- 2023 IFBB Toronto Pro Supershow - 2nd
- 2024 IFBB Triple O Dynasty Pro - 1st
- 2024 IFBB Ms. Olympia – 10th

=== Best statistics ===
- Biceps - 16 inches (41 cm)
- Calves - 15.5 inches (39 cm)
- Chest press: 100 lb (45 kg) dumbbells
- Deadlift: 405 lb (184 kg)
- Forearms - 12.5 inches (32 cm)
- Incline and flat bench: 215 lb (98 kg)
- On season weight:
  - 155–160 lb (70–73 kg) (6 February 2017)
  - 150 lb (68 kg) (29 October 2020)
  - 149 lb (68 kg) (2020 Ms. Olympia)
- Pullovers: 120 lb (54 kg)
- Sled press: 1,000 lb + (450 kg) +
- Squat: 500 lb (230 kg)
- Quads - 24.5 inches (62 cm)

== Women's physique career ==
In 2021, Ivancik was told by judges to switch to the women's physique division. At the 2021 IFBB Professional League Chicago Pro, she placed 7th, much poorer results compared to her female bodybuilding career. She didn't feel at home, along with feeling she was too big for the division. So she decided to switch back to female bodybuilding in 2022.

Contest history

- 2015 NPC IFBB Professional League (IFBB) North American - 4th (Class C)
- 2016 NPC IFBB Professional League (IFBB) North American - 8th (Class C)
- 2021 IFBB Professional League Chicago Pro - 7th

== Personal life ==
Ivancik currently lives in Butler, Pennsylvania. She is engaged to Jeff Harlan since 2019.

== See also ==
- Female bodybuilding
- List of female professional bodybuilders
