= 2023 Ms. Olympia =

Professional female bodybuilding contest

- Promotion: IFBB Pro League
- Date: 3 November 2023
- Venue: Orange County Convention Center (West Hall A (finals only) & Hall B)
- City: Orlando, Florida, United States of America

Event chronology
2022 Ms. Olympia	2023 Ms. Olympia	2024 Ms. Olympia

The 2023 Ms. Olympia was an International Federation of Bodybuilding and Fitness Professional League (IFBB Pro League) professional female bodybuilding contest and part of Joe Weider's Olympia Fitness & Performance Weekend 2023. This was the 39th Ms. Olympia contest to be held.

== Prize money ==
- 1st - $50,000
- 2nd - $20,000
- 3rd - $12,000
- 4th - $7,000
- 5th - $6,000

Total: $95,000

== Rounds ==
- Judging Round: This round focused on evaluating contestants based on symmetry, muscularity, and conditioning.
- Finals Round: This included the posing routines, where contestants showcased their presentation, creativity, and stage presence, followed by the final posedown.

== Callouts ==
=== Prejudging ===
1. Michaela Aycock, Alcione Barreto, Andrea Shaw, Angela Yeo, Sherry Priami (switched with Natalia Kovaleva) and Natalia (switched with Sherry)
2. Chelsea Dion, Reshanna Boswell, MayLa Ash and Julia Whitesel
3. Angela and Andrea

=== Finals ===
1. Reshanna, MayLa, Michaela, Natalia, Chelsea and Julia
2. Alcione, Andrea, Angela and Sherry

== Results ==
- 1st - Andrea Shaw
- 2nd - Angela Yeo
- 3rd - Alcione Barreto
- 4th - Sherry Priami
- 5th - Natalia Kovaleva
- 6th - Michaela Aycock
- 7th - MayLa Ash
- 8th - Chelsea Dion
- 9th - Reshanna Boswell
- 10th - Julia Whitesel

Comparison to previous Olympia results:

- Same - Andrea Shaw
- Same - Angela Yeo
- +5 - Alcione Barreto
- Same - Michaela Aycock
- +4 - MayLa Ash
- +1 - Chelsea Dion
- +7 - Reshanna Boswell

=== Scorecard ===
No	NAME	COUNTRY	JUDGING	FINALS	TOTALS	PLACE
1	MayLa Ash	USA			36	7
2	Michaela Aycock	USA			30	6
3	Alcione Barreto	Brazil			15	3
4	Reshanna Boswell	USA			45	9
5	Chelsea Dion	USA			39	8
6	Natalia Kovaleva	USA			25	5
7	Sherry Priami	USA			20	4
8	Julia Whitesel	USA			49	10
9	Angela Yeo	USA			10	2
10	Andrea Shaw	USA			5	1

== Attendees ==
- 4th Ms. Olympia attended - MayLa Ash, Reshanna Boswell and Andrea Shaw
- 3rd Ms. Olympia attended - Michaela Aycock
- 2nd Ms. Olympia attended - Alcione Barreto and Chelsea Dion
- 1st Ms. Olympia attended - Natalia Kovaleva, Sherry Priami and Julia Whitesel

== Notable events ==
- Andrea Shaw won her 4th Ms. Olympia consecutively, beating Sergio Oliva and Frank Zane's record three consecutive Ms. Olympia wins and tying with Kim Chizevsky-Nicholls' record four consecutive Ms. Olympia wins, along with Jay Cutler's record four Mr. Olympia wins.
- This contest had only 10 contestants competing, the fewest contestants competing in Ms. Olympia ever. The reason for this is because of the removal of the point system for the 2023 Olympia Qualification System, along with Helle Trevino and Kristina Mendoza dropping out of attending the contest.
- The 2023 Ms. Olympia attracted over 700,000 viewers across various streaming platforms, marking it as one of the most-watched Ms. Olympia contests ever. The 2023 Ms. Olympia saw an attendance of approximately 6,500 spectators, with approximately 3,000 attendees for the prejudging and approximately 3,500 attendees for the finals, with approximately 4,000 paid tickets sold.

== 2023 Ms. Olympia Qualified ==
Name	Country	How Qualified
Andrea Shaw	(United States)	2022 Ms. Olympia - 1st
Angela Yeo	(United States)	2022 Ms. Olympia - 2nd
Helle Trevino	(United States)	2022 Ms. Olympia - 3rd
Sherry Priami	(United States)	2023 IFBB Pro League Vancouver Island Showdown Pro Women's Bodybuilding - 1st
Natalia Kovaleva	(United States)	2023 IFBB Pro League New York Pro Pro Women's Bodybuilding - 1st
Julia Whitesel	(United States)	2023 IFBB Pro League Toronto Pro Supershow WBB Women's Bodybuilding - 1st
Alcione Barreto	(Brazil)	2023 IFBB Pro League Mr. Big Evolution Pro Women's Bodybuilding - 1st
MayLa Ash	(United States)	2023 IFBB Pro League Lenda Murray Atlanta Pro Women's Bodybuilding - 1st
Kristina Mendoza	(United States)	2023 IFBB Pro League Chicago Pro Women's Bodybuilding - 1st
Michaela Aycock	(United States)	2023 IFBB Pro League Tampa Pro Women's Bodybuilding - 1st
Reshanna Boswell	(United States)	2023 IFBB Pro League Masters Olympia Women's Bodybuilding - 1st
Chelsea Dion	(United States)	2023 IFBB Pro League European Pro Championships Women's Bodybuilding - 1st
