= SHOT Show =

US annual trade show for the shooting, hunting, and firearms industry

- Logo
- Status: Active
- Genre: Firearms
- Venue: Sands Expo (As of 2010)
- Locations: Las Vegas, Nevada (As of 2010)
- Country: United States
- Inaugurated: 19 January 1979
- Attendance: 61,000
- Organizer: National Shooting Sports Foundation
- Website: Official website

The SHOT Show, which is an acronym for "Shooting, Hunting, and Outdoor Trade Show", is an American annual trade show for the shooting sports, hunting, outdoor recreation, and firearm manufacturing industries. The show is sponsored by the National Shooting Sports Foundation (NSSF).

The first ever SHOT Show was held in St. Louis, Missouri, in 1979. It used to rotate between Las Vegas, Nevada; Orlando, Florida; New Orleans, Louisiana, and several other U.S. cities, although since 2010 it has taken place only in Las Vegas at the Sands Expo (renamed the Venetian Expo in September 2021), and is contracted to remain there through 2027. It attracted over 60,000 attendees to its 630,000 square feet (59,000 m^{2}) of exhibition space in Las Vegas. It is among the top 25 trade shows in the US.

== Locations ==
Source for all attendance information:

Year	Dates	City	Attendees
1979		St. Louis, Missouri	5,600
1980		San Francisco, California	8,500
1981		New Orleans, Louisiana	17,800
1982		Atlanta, Georgia	17,850
1983		Dallas, Texas	20,000
1984		Dallas, Texas	22,000
1985		Atlanta, Georgia	19,200
1986		Houston, Texas	20,950
1987		New Orleans, Louisiana	19,500
1988		Las Vegas, Nevada	19,800
1989		Dallas, Texas	23,500
1990		Las Vegas, Nevada	23,523
1991		Dallas, Texas	25,525
1992		New Orleans, Louisiana	23,262
1993		Houston, Texas	25,030
1994		Dallas, Texas	27,800
1995		Las Vegas, Nevada	29,600
1996		Dallas, Texas	28,500
1997		Las Vegas, Nevada	35,102
1998	Jan 27–30	Las Vegas, Nevada	32,756
1999		Atlanta, Georgia	25,814
2000		Las Vegas, Nevada	29,607
2001		New Orleans, Louisiana	25,496
2002		Las Vegas, Nevada	31,342
2003		Orlando, Florida	27,494
2004		Las Vegas, Nevada	33,264
2005		Las Vegas, Nevada	37,730
2006		Las Vegas, Nevada	40,892
2007		Orlando, Florida	42,216
2008		Las Vegas, Nevada	58,769
2009	Jan 15–18	Orlando, Florida (Orange County Convention Center)	48,907
2010	Jan 19–22	Las Vegas, Nevada (Sands Expo)	58,444
2011	Jan 18–21	Las Vegas, Nevada (Sands Expo)	57,390
2012	Jan 17–20	Las Vegas, Nevada (Sands Expo)	61,017
2013	Jan 15–18	Las Vegas, Nevada (Sands Expo)	62,371
2014	Jan 14–17	Las Vegas, Nevada (Sands Expo)	67,000+
2015	Jan 20–23	Las Vegas, Nevada (Sands Expo)	~64,000
2016	Jan 19–22	Las Vegas, Nevada (Sands Expo)	54,547
2017	Jan 17–20	Las Vegas, Nevada (Sands Expo)	~65,000
2018	Jan 23–26	Las Vegas, Nevada (Sands Expo)	~60,000
2019	Jan 22–25	Las Vegas, Nevada (Sands Expo)	58,000+
2020	Jan 21–24	Las Vegas, Nevada (Sands Expo)	55,149 +
2021	Jan 19–22	Las Vegas, Nevada (Sands Expo)	cancelled
2022	Jan 18–21	Las Vegas, Nevada (Sands Expo)	~43,000
2023	Jan 17–20	Las Vegas, Nevada (Sands Expo)	52,000
2024	Jan 23–26	Las Vegas, Nevada (Sands Expo)	55,400+
2025	Jan 21-24	Las Vegas, Nevada (Sands Expo)	52,000 +
2026	Jan	Las Vegas, Nevada (Sands Expo)	53,000 +
2027	Jan	Las Vegas, Nevada (Sands Expo)	
