= Colt Officer's ACP =

Colt Officer's Model
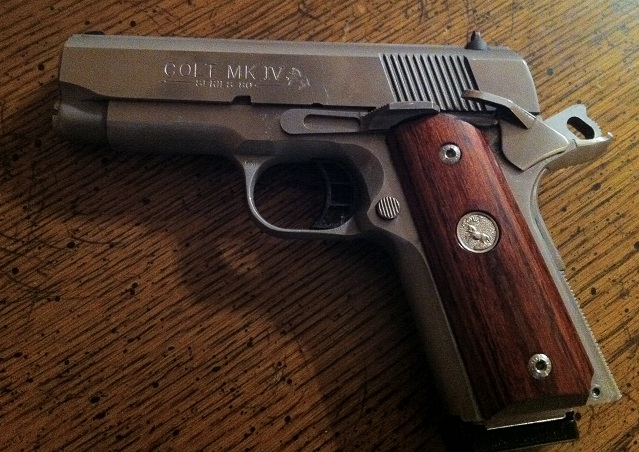
- Stainless Colt Officer's Model
- Type: Semi-automatic pistol
- Place of origin: United States

Production history
- Designed: 1985
- Produced: since 1985
- Variants: Concealed Carry Officer's pistol, Lightweight Officer's ACP

Specifications
- Mass: 34 oz (960 g)
- Length: 7.5 in (19 cm)
- Barrel length: 3.5 in (8.9 cm)
- Cartridge: .45 ACP
- Action: Short recoil operation
- Feed system: 6 round or 7 round magazine

The Colt Officer's Model or Colt Officer's ACP is a single-action, semi-automatic, magazine-fed, and recoil-operated handgun based on the John M. Browning designed M1911. It was introduced in 1985 as a response from Colt to numerous aftermarket companies making smaller versions of the M1911 pistol.

== History ==
In 1975, Rock Island Arsenal developed a compact M1911 pistol it called the "General Officer's Model Pistol" for issue to general officers of the US Army and Air Force, but the pistol was unavailable for sale to the general public.

The following year, Pat Yates of Detonics had introduced his compact "Combat Master", a chopped down 1911, with 3.5" barrel and a shortened grip frame. Seeing the popularity of these compact pistols, other pistolsmiths began offering similar conversions on customers' 1911s.

In 1985, Colt developed their own in-house version and named it the "Colt Officer's ACP". When Colt introduced the 1991 line (a parkerized version of the 1911 with the series 80 firing pin safety and a flat mainspring housing), it included a pistol of the same dimensions as the Officer's ACP.

== Design ==
The main differences from a full-sized M1911 are 6-round magazines not 7-round, 7 1/8" overall length not 8 1/2", 5 1/8" height not 5 1/2", 34-oz not 39-oz, and most characteristically 3 1/2" barrel not 5".

An evaluation example tested by the Technical Staff of the National Rifle Association fired 300 rounds with few difficulties. They reported two failures to feed with wadcutters and one with hardball. Overall, the review is complimentary for its design cues and small size.

That said, production examples failed to live up to the market's expectations. An inescapable characteristic of its compact size, the Colt Officer's ACP drew criticism for being finicky with ammunition and the sharp recoil from the short barrel. Firearms author, Frank James, writes that the decreased velocity from the shorter barrel causes performance of the round to be less than optimal, and a risk if used in a defensive situation.

Reliability and accuracy has been improved through modifications such as replacing the stock barrel bushing with an aftermarket part and judiciously honing the hammer and sear. Beyond trigger work, more sophisticated modifications include replacing the stock hammer and sear with lightweight components, installing a high quality spring set and beveling the inside of the ejection port.

== Variants ==
=== Lightweight Officer's ACP ===
Lighter, aluminium frame version of the Colt Officer's ACP which weighed 10 ounces less (24 ounces).

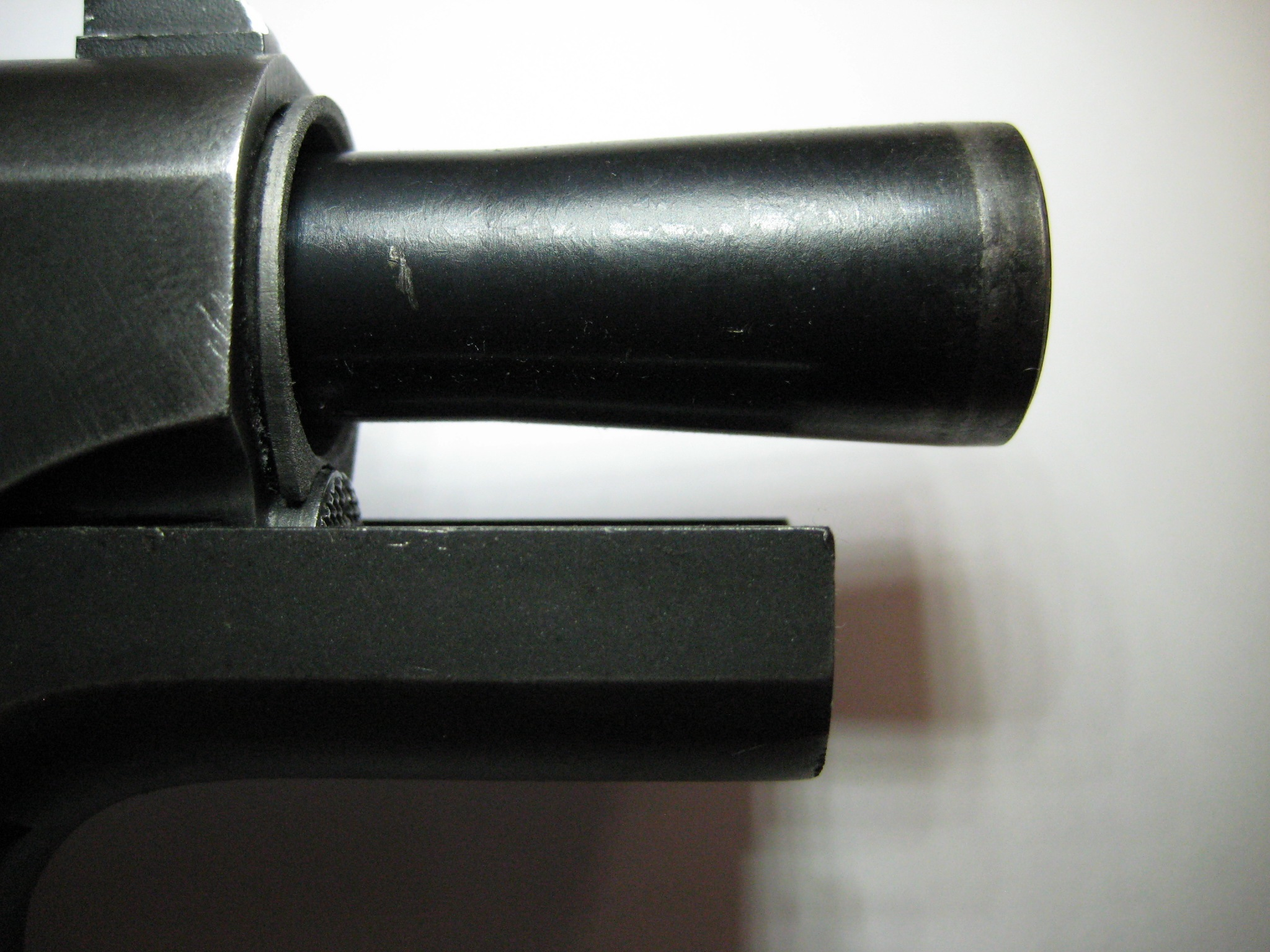
Colt M1991A1 Compact bull barrel and OEM barrel bushing

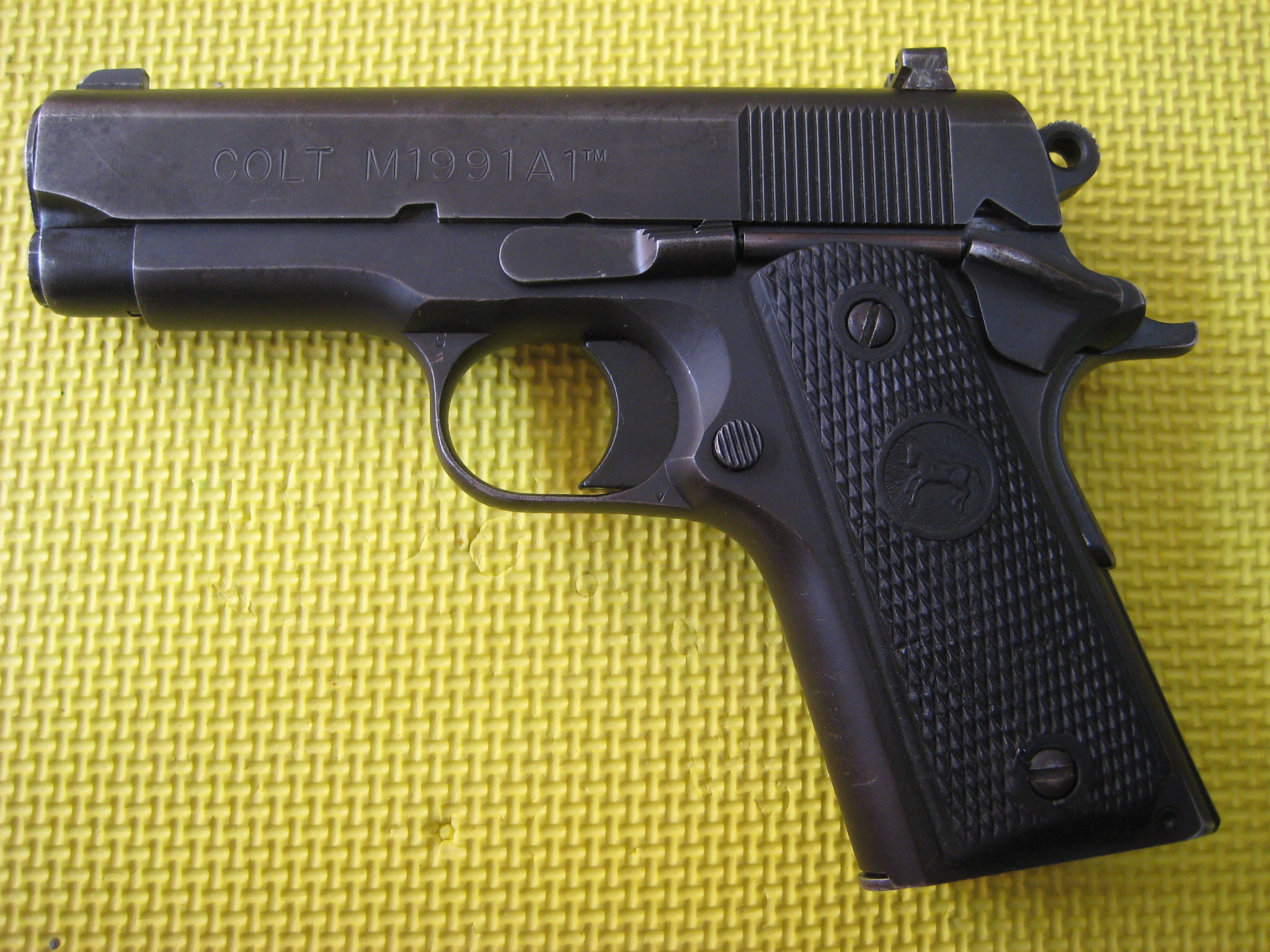
Old Rollmark Model (ORM) M1991A1 Compact pistol

=== Concealed Carry Officers Model ===
A hybridized variation with a Commander-length barrel-slide and aluminum alloy Officers Model frame. Use of the 4.25" Commander-length slide increases reliability, while retaining the small grip profile and light frame of the Officer's model. These variants are produced by a number of 1911 manufacturers.

- Alchemy Custom Prime Compact (formerly Brimstone)
- Colt Wiley Clapp CCO (fine line checkering by gunsmith Pete Single)
- Dan Wesson Pointman Carry
- Dan Wesson Vigil CCO
- Fusion Freedom CCO
- Les Baer Stinger
- Nighthawk War Hawk CCO & T3 CCO
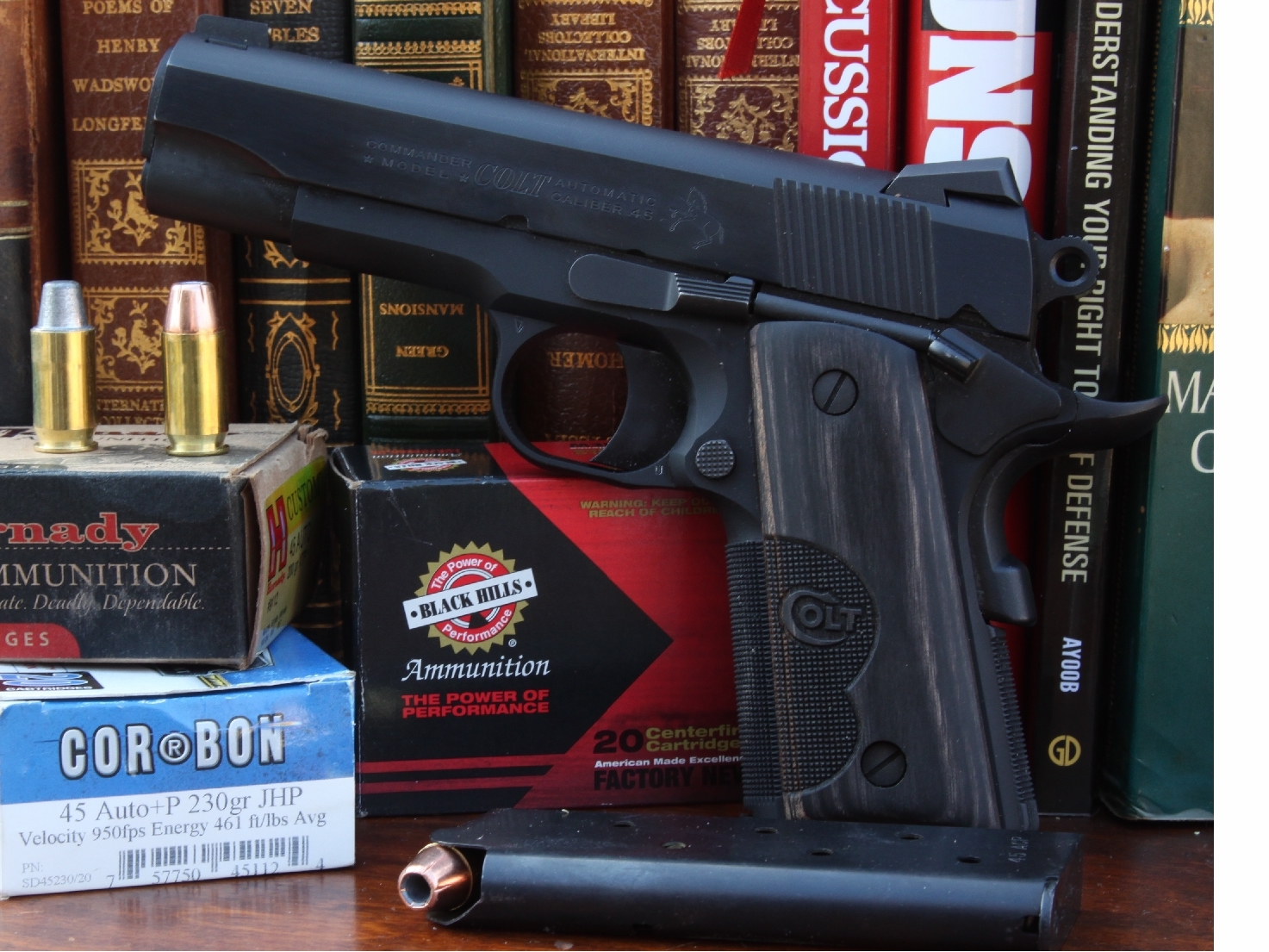
Talo/Wiley Clap Concealed Carry Officers Model
