= M15 pistol =

M15 General Officer's Pistol
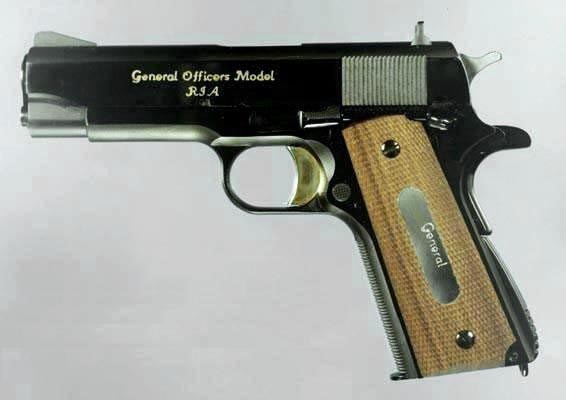
- M15 pistol
- Type: Semi-automatic pistol
- Place of origin: United States

Service history
- In service: 1972–1981

Production history
- Designer: Rock Island Arsenal
- Manufacturer: Rock Island Arsenal
- Produced: 1972–1984
- No. built: 1,004

Specifications
- Mass: 36.32 oz (1,030 g) empty
- Length: 7.90 in (201 mm)
- Barrel length: 4.25 in (108 mm)
- Cartridge: .45 ACP
- Action: Short recoil
- Rate of fire: Semi-automatic
- Muzzle velocity: 800ft/s (245 m/s)
- Feed system: 7-round single column, detachable box magazine

The M15 General Officers is a .45 ACP pistol developed by the U.S. Army's Rock Island Arsenal from stock M1911 pistols.

== History ==
Originally intended for high-ranking military personnel, the M15 was built from an existing stock of Colt M1911 pistols. It is similar to the Colt Commander, but has internal differences.

Colt later released a similar pistol called the Colt Officer's ACP. This model is commonly referred to as the "Officer". It was adopted to give officers a weapon with greater stopping power and effectiveness over previously issued sidearms.

There is some disagreement in sources over its formal designation, possibly either Pistol, General Officers', Caliber .45, M15 or Pistol, Cal. .45, Semi-automatic, M1911A1, General Officer's.

The M9 9mm replaced the M15 as the general officer pistol in the 1980s.

== Features ==
The M15 is quite similar to the Colt Commander and is operationally similar to the M1911A1.

=== Operation ===
The shorter barrel is reported to have a greater muzzle blast, yet even with the abbreviated barrel, the pistol maintains a muzzle velocity of 245 m/s (800 ft/s). The pistol's sights are larger than the standard M1911A1's, including a taller front sight.

Magazines remain interchangeable between the two models. A lanyard may be attached to the mainspring housing.

=== Distinction ===
The M15 is made to a higher standard of finish to distinguish it as a general officer's pistol. The finish on the guns was a deep blue on portions of the slide and frame. The exposed metal parts such as the safety and slide lock have a polished blued finish, while the top of the slide has a black matte-type finish.

It has select-grade walnut grips with a brass placard on the left grip, with the owner's name engraved in it, and the Rock Island Arsenal seal on the right grip. The slide is also engraved, "General Officer's Model" and the abbreviation "RIA" for Rock Island Arsenal.

The pistol came with a black leather belt, black leather holster, black leather two-pocket magazine pouch, cleaning kit, and three magazines that were serial-numbered to the weapon.

The belt's buckle and any other metal parts were either in gold for the Army or silver for the Air Force.

== Adoption ==
The pistol was issued to United States Army general officers as a personal weapon as a replacement for the aging Colt Model 1903 Pocket Hammerless pistols.

Formally adopted from 1972 to 1981, it is no longer produced but remains in service with some long-career officers.

A total of 1,004 were made and issued. When a general left active service he was given the choice of returning or purchasing it. Most chose to buy it as a memento of their service, a tradition that continues to this day.

== Bibliography ==
- Kinard, Jeff. Pistols: An Illustrated History of Their Impact, ABC-CLIO, Santa Barbara, CA, 2003. ISBN 1-85109-470-9.
- McNab, Chris, The Great Book of Guns, Thunder Bay Press, San Diego, CA, 2004. ISBN 978-1-59223-304-5.
