= Angela Yeo =

American professional bodybuilder (born 1984)

- ♀ Professional bodybuilder
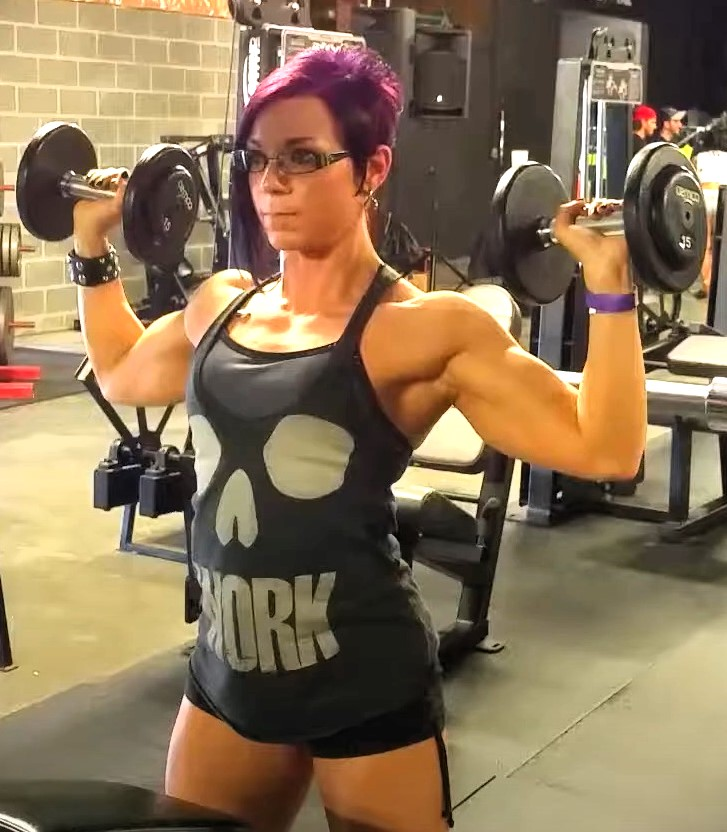
- Angela Yeo training with dumbbells in 2015.

Personal info
- Nickname: The Giant Slayer
- Née: Wortman
- Full name: Angela C. Yeo
- Born: Angela C. Wortman; July 23, 1984 (age 41)

Best statistics
- Contest weight: 147–157 lb (67–71 kg)
- Height: 5 ft 2 in (1.57 m)

Professional (Pro) career
- Pro-debut: International Federation of Bodybuilding & Fitness Pro League (IFBB) Chicago Pro; 2022
- Best wins: IFBB Rising Phoenix World Championships; 2024
- Predecessors: Andrea Shaw
- Pro years: 2022–present
Medal record
IFBB Ms. Olympia
2nd	2022 Ms. Olympia
2nd	2023 Ms. Olympia
2nd	2024 Ms. Olympia
IFBB Rising Phoenix World Championships
2nd	2023 Rising Phoenix World Championships
1st	2024 Rising Phoenix World Championships
IFBB Chicago Pro
1st	2022 Chicago Pro

Angela C. Yeo (née Wortman; born July 23, 1984) is an American professional bodybuilder, along with a former professional figure, powerlifter and women's physique contestant. She is currently the second highest ranking professional female bodybuilder.

== Early life ==
Her hometown is Temperance, Michigan. She graduated from Bedford Senior High School. She studied at the Eastern Michigan University, then studied personal training and sport nutrition at the International Sports Sciences Association.

== Figure career ==
- 2013 EPFNB Toledo Glass Scepter - 1st
- 2013 ABA/INBA/PNBA Natural Universe - 1st and best female presentation award
- 2013 ABA/INBA/PNBA Natural Olympia - 1st and best presentation award
- 2014 ABA/INBA/PNBA Spartan Natural Classic Bodybuilding Championships and Pro Figure Women of Sparta - 1st
- 2014 ABA/INBA/PNBA Natural Universe - 1st
- 2014 ABA/INBA/PNBA Natural Olympia - 4th
- 2015 ABA/INBA/PNBA North American Naturals - 2nd and best female presentation award

== Powerlifting career ==
- 2017 UPA Detroit Barbell In-house Classic Powerlifting - 2nd (132 lb (60 kg) weight class; Squat 195 lb (88 kg)/Bench 165 lb (75 kg)/Deadlift 303 lb (137 kg))
- 2017 UPA Michigan Powerlifting State Championships - 1st (148 lb (67 kg) weight class; Squat 225.97 lb (102.50 kg)/Bench 165.35 lb (75.00 kg)/Deadlift 319.67 lb (145.00 kg))
- 2018 USPA Main Street Mayhem Powerlifting - 1st (123 lb (56 kg) weight class; Squat 231.5 lb (105.0 kg)/Bench 170.9 lb (77.5 kg)/Deadlift 330.7 lb (150.0 kg))
- 2019 USPA Bare-bones Powerlifting - 1st (148.8 lb (67.5 kg) Classic Raw; Squat 281.1 lb (127.5 kg)/Bench 203.9 lb (92.5 kg)/Deadlift 341.7 lb (155.0 kg))
- 2019 APF Cincinnati Women's Pro/Am - 3rd (148 lb (67 kg) Classic Raw; Squat 305 lb (138 kg)/Bench 205 lb (93 kg)/Deadlift 355 lb (161 kg))
- 2019 USPA National Powerlifting Championships - 4th (148 lb (67 kg) Classic Raw; Squat 303.1 lb (137.5 kg)/Bench 203.9 lb (92.5 kg)/Deadlift 369.3 lb (167.5 kg))

== Women’s physique career ==
- 2015 ABA/INBA/PNBA North American Naturals - 1st and best female presentation award
- 2015 DFAC Cardinal Classic - 1st
- 2015 DFAC World Finals - 1st
- 2015 ABA/INBA/PNBA Natural Olympia - 1st
- 2017 NPC Kentucky Muscle - 1st
- 2018 NPC Arnold Classic - 3rd
- 2020 NPC Warrior Games - 1st (Overall and Class A)
- 2020 NPC National Championships 1st (Overall and Class A)

== Professional bodybuilding career ==
In 2021, Angela switched from physique to bodybuilding and won her pro debut at the 2022 IFBB Pro Chicago Pro, qualifying for the 2022 Ms. Olympia. She quickly rose up the bodybuilding ranks by placing runner-up to Andrea Shaw at the 2022 Ms. Olympia, a feat not achieved since Denise Rutkowski. This also qualified her for the 2023 Ms. Olympia. She later repeated her runner-up placing to Andrea at the 2023 Rising Phoenix World Championships and 2023 Ms. Olympia. On August 24, 2024 Angela defeated Shaw to win her first ever Rising Phoenix World Championship.

=== Contest results ===
- 2022 IFBB Pro League Chicago Pro - 1st
- 2022 IFBB Pro League Ms. Olympia - 2nd
- 2023 IFBB Pro League Rising Phoenix World Championships - 2nd
- 2023 IFBB Pro League Ms. Olympia - 2nd
- 2024 IFBB Pro League Rising Phoenix World Championships - 1st
- 2024 IFBB Pro League Ms. Olympia - 2nd
- 2025 IFBB Pro League Ms. Olympia - 4th
