= Alena Hatvani =

Czech female bodybuilder (died 2021)

- Professional bodybuilder

Personal info
- Born: 1974 or 1975
- Died: August 2021 (aged 46); Alicante, Spain

Best statistics

Professional (Pro) career
- Best win: Gold at 2017 Ben Weider Legacy Cup New Zealand; 2017

Alena Hatvani (née Kosinová; 1974/5 – August 2021) was a Czech professional bodybuilder.

Alena Hatvani was one of the most successful Czech female bodybuilders and was a professional competitor in the IFBB organisation. Her best result came in the 2017 Ben Weider Legacy Cup New Zealand, where she won gold in the women's physique category. Her dream, however, was to compete for Ms. Olympia. She had actually qualified for the 2020 competition, but was not able to participate because of COVID-19.

She died suddenly in August 2021 during the competition in Alicante in Spain. She was married and had 2 children.

== Women's physique career ==
=== Competition history ===
- 2017 Ben Weider Legacy Cup New Zealand - 1st
- 2017 IFBB Arnold Amateur Australia - 3rd
- 2017 IFBB Amateur Olympia Spain - 5th
- 2017 IFBB Arnold Amateur Europe - 5th (Physique B) and Masters Physique (DNP)
- 2018 IFBB International Cup Grand Prix Russia - 3rd
- 2019 Czech Open Cup Pro Qualifier - 1st

== Women's bodybuilding career ==
=== Competition history ===
- 2019 IFBB Romania Muscle Fest Pro - 4th
- 2020 IFBB Europa Pro Championships - 2nd
- 2021 IFBB Mr Big Evolution Pro - 5th
