= Global Gaming Expo =

Gambling industry trade show

- Status: Active
- Genre: Gambling
- Frequency: Annual
- Venue: Sands Expo (G2E); The Venetian Macao (G2E Asia); Marriott Manila (G2E Asia @ the Philippines)
- Locations: Las Vegas; Macau; Manila
- Country: United States; China; Philippines
- Inaugurated: October 1, 2001; 25 years ago (G2E); June 13, 2007; 19 years ago (G2E Asia); December 3, 2019; 6 years ago (G2E Asia @ the Philippines)
- Founders: American Gaming Association; Reed Exhibitions
- Website: www.globalgamingexpo.com www.g2easia.com www.g2easiaphilippines.com

Global Gaming Expo (G2E) is a gambling industry trade show presented by the American Gaming Association (AGA) and organized by Reed Exhibitions. The flagship G2E convention debuted in 2001 and is held each fall in Las Vegas, Nevada.

== G2E Las Vegas ==
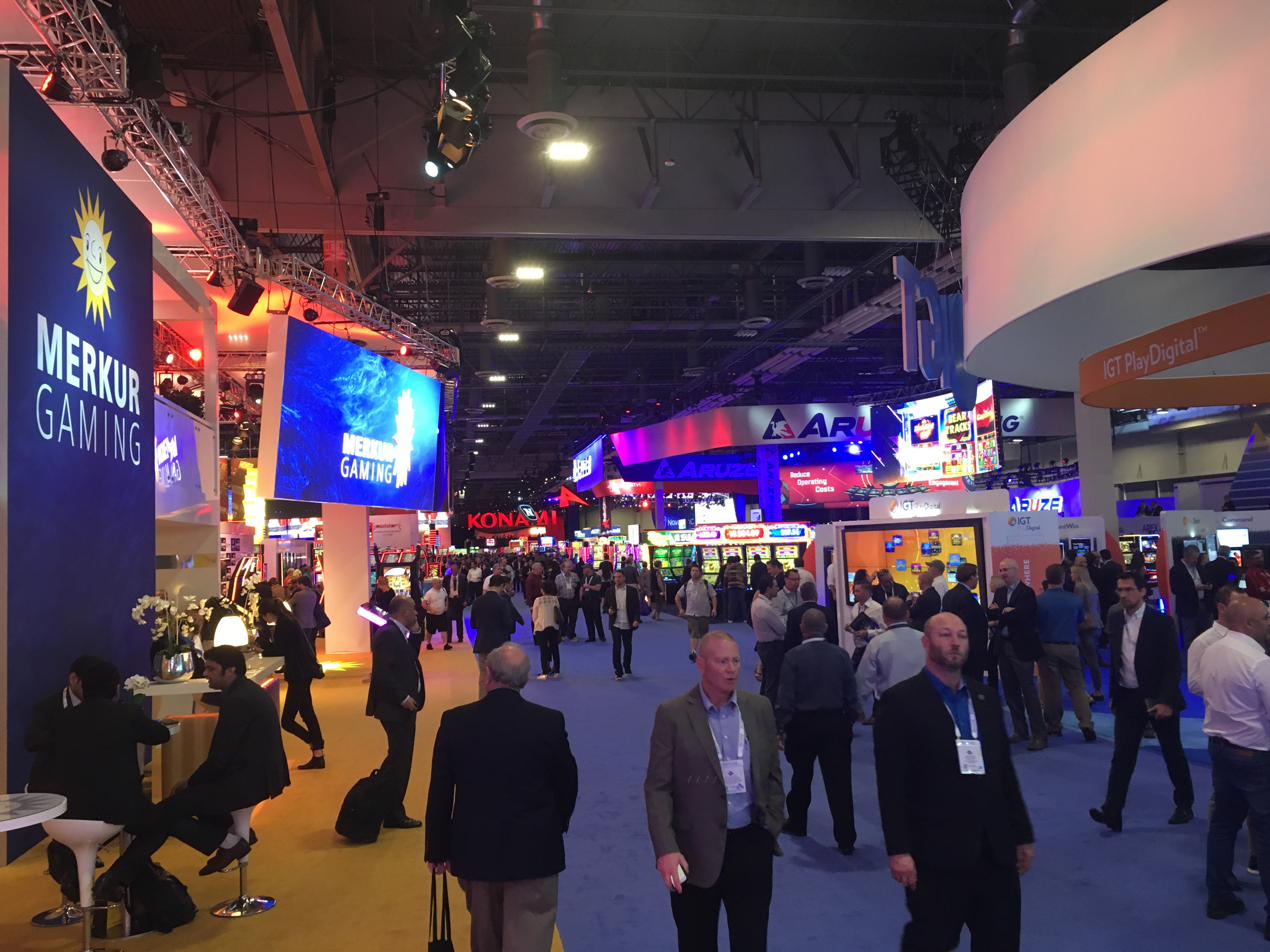
The exhibit floor at the 2018 Global Gaming Expo.

The first Global Gaming Expo took place October 1–3, 2001 at the Las Vegas Convention Center (LVCC), featuring 375 corporate exhibitors, nearly 10,000 attendees, and VIP keynote speakers such as Academy Award-winning actress Whoopi Goldberg and then-chairman and CEO of MGM Studios Alex Yemenidjian. In previous years, LVCC had been the site of GEM Communications' World Gaming Congress & Expo (WGCE), which had maintained a partnership with AGA and was essentially unrivaled as the industry's preeminent conference. After failing to negotiate a contract renewal with GEM in 2000, however, the AGA elected to launch G2E as a rival exhibition that would be "by the industry and for the industry." Its first year was also WGCE's last; sixth months after the inaugural Global Gaming Expo, AGA bought out WGCE, establishing G2E as North America's largest exhibition for the gaming-entertainment industry.

In 2010, the AGA announced that the tenth annual expo that November would be the last to take place at LVCC before a move to the privately owned Sands Expo, where G2E has since remained. The change of venue was accompanied by a return to the exhibition's original time of year, with the AGA citing the need for "more breathing room between major international gaming events" among its reasons for moving back to early October.

G2E features educational sessions that typically run from Monday through Thursday of the conference week, as well as an expo hall open from Tuesday through Thursday where hundreds of exhibitor companies showcase products and services. Since 2013, annual total show attendance has consistently topped 25,000, and in 2017 G2E was recognized as one of the 25 fastest-growing trade shows by attendance.

== G2E Asia ==
Specifically targeting the growing Asian gaming industry, the annual Global Gaming Expo Asia (G2E Asia) is, like its larger American counterpart, presented by the American Gaming Association and organized by Reed Exhibitions. In 2006, the same year Macau's gambling industry surpassed that of Las Vegas in gross gaming revenues, Global Gaming Expo acquired the Asian Gaming Expo from the Australasian Gaming Machine Manufacturers Association, and announced that it would rebrand the annual event as G2E Asia. The convention debuted at the Macau Tower June 13–14, 2007, shortly before the opening of G2E Asia's long-term home, The Venetian Macao, which as of 2019 has housed the expo in every year since.

In 2019, G2E Asia expanded its scope with the announcement of the inaugural G2E Asia @ the Philippines exhibition, to take place December 3–4 of that year in cooperation with the Philippine Amusement and Gaming Corporation. Organizers selected the Marriott Manila, part of the Resorts World Manila integrated resort, as the venue for the new event.
