= 2020 Ms. Olympia =

Professional female bodybuilding contest

- Promotion: IFBB Pro League
- Date: 18 December 2020
- Venue: Orange County Convention Center West (Chapin Theater (prejudging) and Valencia Ballroom (finals))
- City: (Orlando, Florida) Orlando, Florida, United States

Event chronology
2014 Ms. Olympia	2020 Ms. Olympia	2021 Ms. Olympia

The 2020 Ms. Olympia was an IFBB Pro League professional female bodybuilding contest and part of Joe Weider's Olympia Fitness & Performance Weekend 2020. It was the 36th Ms. Olympia competition held.

== Prize money ==
- 1st – $50,000
- 2nd – $20,000
- 3rd – $12,000
- 4th – $7,000
- 5th – $6,000
- Total: $95,000

== Rounds ==
- Prejudging Round: Judges evaluated contestants based on symmetry, muscularity, and conditioning, focusing on overall balance, proportion, and muscle definition.
- Finals Round: Contestants performed their choreographed posing routines to music, showcasing creativity, presentation, and stage presence. The final posedown allowed direct comparisons among the contestants.

== Results ==
- 1st – Andrea Shaw
- 2nd – Margaret V. Martin
- 3rd – Helle Trevino
- 4th – MayLa Ash
- 5th – Irene Andersen
- 6th – Monique Jones
- 7th – Asha Hadley
- 8th – Nicki Chartrand
- 9th – Reshanna Boswell
- 10th – Margita Zamolova
- 11th – Kim Buck
- 12th – LaDawn McDay
- 13th – Yaxeni Oriquen-Garcia
- 14th – Theresa Ivancik
- 15th – Janeen Lankowski

Comparison to previous Olympia results:

- +8 – Margie
- +9 – Helle
- +2 – Monique
- Same – Kim
- -8 – Yaxeni

=== Scorecard ===
No	NAME	COUNTRY	JUDGING	PLACE
1	Irene Andersen	Sweden	27	5
2	MayLa Ash	USA	20	4
3	Reshanna Boswell	USA	45	9
4	Kim Buck	USA	55	11
5	Nicki Chartrand	Canada	38	8
6	Asha Hadley	USA	37	7
7	Theresa Ivancik	USA	70	14
8	Monique Jones	USA	28	6
9	Janeen Lankowski	USA	75	15
10	Margaret V. Martin	USA	10	2
11	LaDawn McDay	USA	60	12
12	Yaxeni Oriquen-Garcia	Venezuela	65	13
13	Andrea Shaw	USA	5	1
14	Helle Trevino	USA	15	3
15	Margita Zamolova	Czech Republic	50	10

== Attended ==
- 18th Ms. Olympia attended – Yaxeni Oriquen-Garcia
- 4th Ms. Olympia attended – Monique Jones and Helle Trevino
- 2nd Ms. Olympia attended – Margaret V. Martin
- 1st Ms. Olympia attended – Irene Andersen, MayLa Ash, Reshanna Boswell, Kim Buck, Nicki Chartrand, Asha Hadley, Theresa Ivancik, Janeen Lankowski, LaDawn McDay, Andrea Shaw and Margita Zamolova

== Notable events ==
- Andrea Shaw won her first Ms. Olympia, which was also her first Ms. Olympia contest she attended. This is a feat not performed since Lenda Murray won her first Ms. Olympia contest she attended in 1990 and when Mike Mentzer won the Mr. Olympia lightweight title at his first Mr. Olympia contest he attended in 1979. The day of the 2020 Ms. Olympia was also Andrea's 37th birthday.
- The 2020 Ms. Olympia was rescheduled and moved from 11 September 2020 at the Las Vegas Convention Center in Winchester, Nevada to 18 December 2020 at the Orange County Convention Center in Orlando, Florida due to COVID-19 restrictions in Nevada.
- The 2020 Olympia Press Conference was the first conference to feature Ms. Olympia contestants since 2007.
- It was revealed after the 2020 Ms. Olympia prejudging that Iris Kyle could not compete at the 2020 Ms. Olympia due to a pancreatic virus, high blood sugar, insulin shut down, and losing over 20 lb (9.1 kg), all of which lead to her in intensive care unit until 4 am the morning of the 2020 Ms. Olympia.
- The 2020 Ms. Olympia posedown had all contestants posing in it.
- At the 2020 Ms. Olympia finals, Yaxeni Oriquen-Garcia announced she would retire from bodybuilding.

== 2020 Ms. Olympia Qualified ==
Name	Country	How Qualified
Helle Trevino	(United States)	2019 IFBB Pro League Wings of Strength (WOS) Rising Phoenix World Championships – 1st
Margaret V. Martin	(United States)	2019 IFBB Pro League WOS Rising Phoenix World Championships – 2nd
Irene Andersen	(Sweden)	2019 IFBB Pro League WOS Rising Phoenix World Championships – 3rd
Nicki Chartrand	(Canada)	2019 IFBB Pro League WOS Rising Phoenix World Championships – 4th
Monique Jones	(United States)	2019 IFBB Pro League WOS Rising Phoenix World Championships – 5th
Monia Gioiosa	(Italy)	2019 IFBB Pro League WOS Romania Muscle Fest Pro Women's Bodybuilding – 1st
Yaxeni Oriquen-Garcia	(Venezuela)	Ms. Olympia Winner
Iris Kyle	(United States)	Ms. Olympia Winner
Andrea Shaw	(United States)	2020 IFBB Pro League Omaha Pro Women's Bodybuilding – 1st
LaDawn McDay	(United States)	2020 Wings of Strength IFBB Pro League Yamamoto Nutrition Cup Tampa Pro Women's Bodybuilding – 1st
Asha Hadley	(United States)	2020 IFBB Pro League Savannah Pro Women's Bodybuilding – 1st
MayLa Ash	(United States)	2020 IFBB Pro League New York Pro Women's Bodybuilding – 1st
Margita Zamolova	(Czech Republic)	2020 IFBB Pro League European Pro Women's Bodybuilding – 1st
Alena Hatvani	(Czech Republic)	2020 IFBB Pro League European Pro Women's Bodybuilding – 2nd
Theresa Ivancik	(United States)	2020 IFBB Pro League Wings of Strength Chicago Pro Women's Bodybuilding – 1st
Janeen Lankowski	(United States)	2020 Wings of Strength IFBB Pro League Yamamoto Nutrition Cup Tampa Pro Women's Bodybuilding – 2nd 2020 IFBB Savannah Pro Women's Bodybuilding – 9th 2020 IFBB New York Pro Women's Bodybuilding – 4th
Reshanna Boswell	(United States)	2020 IFBB Pro League Omaha Pro Women's Bodybuilding – 2nd 2020 IFBB Pro League Lenda Murray Savannah Pro Women's Bodybuilding – 3rd 2020 IFBB IFBB Pro League Wings of Strength Chicago Pro Women's Bodybuilding – 2nd
Kim Buck	(United States)	2020 IFBB Pro League Savannah Pro Women's Bodybuilding – 2nd 2020 IFBB New York Pro Women's Bodybuilding – 2nd

=== Points standings ===
Ranking ^{1}	Name	Country	Points
1	Janeen Lankowski	(United States)	14
2	Reshanna Boswell	(United States)	13
3	Kim Buck	(United States)	12
4	Tina Williams	(United States)	11
5	Angela Rayburn	(United States)	9
6	Maria Flores	(United States)	7
6	Claudia Partenza	(Italy)	7
7	Hailey McGrath	(United States)	6
8	Barbara Carita	(Italy)	5
8	Pamela Hannam	(United States)	5
8	Anne Sheehan	(United States)	5
9	Patti Hanson	(United States)	4
9	Nataliya Kuznetsova	(Russia)	4
10	Virginia Sanchez Macias	(Spain)	3
11	Elena Oana Hreapca	(United States)	1
11	Andrea Saurer	(United States)	1

^{1} In the event of a tie, the competitor with the best top five contest placings will be awarded the qualification. If both competitors have the same contest placings, than both will qualify for the Olympia.
