= 2021 Ms. Olympia =

Professional female bodybuilding contest

- Promotion: IFBB Pro League
- Date: 8 October 2021
- Venue: Orange County Convention Center West (Hall D2 (finals only)) and Hall E (prejudging))
- City: (Orlando, Florida) Orlando, Florida, United States of America

Event chronology
2020 Ms. Olympia	2021 Ms. Olympia	2022 Ms. Olympia

The 2021 Ms. Olympia was an International Federation of Bodybuilding and Fitness Professional League (IFBB Pro League) professional female bodybuilding contest and part of Joe Weider's Olympia Fitness & Performance Weekend 2021. This was the 37th Ms. Olympia contest to be held.

== Rounds ==
- Prejudging Round: Contestants were evaluated on symmetry, muscularity, and conditioning, with a focus on overall physique balance, proportion, muscle definition, and separation.
- Finals Round: Contestants performed their choreographed posing routines to music, showcasing their presentation, creativity, and stage presence. The final posedown allowed for direct comparisons among the top contestants.

== Prize money ==
- 1st - $50,000
- 2nd - $20,000
- 3rd - $10,000
- 4th - $5,000
- 5th - $4,000
- Total: $89,000

== Callouts ==
=== Prejudging ===
1. Mona Poursaleh, Andrea Shaw, Helle Trevino and Margie Martin
2. Margita Zamolova, Virginia Sanchez, Janeen Lankowski, Irene Andersen, Michaela Aycock and Nadia Capotosto
3. Silvia Matta, LaDawn McDay, Sheena Ohlig, MayLa Ash, Reshanna Boswell and Leah Dennie
4. Mona, Andrea, Helle and Margie

=== Finals ===
1. Leah, Reshanna, MayLa, Silvia, MayLa and Sheena
2. Nadia, Janeen, Irene, Michaela, Virginia and Margita
3. Margie, Andrea, Helle and Mona

== Results ==
- 1st - Andrea Shaw
- 2nd - Helle Trevino
- 3rd - Margie Martin
- 4th - Mona Poursaleh
- 5th - Irene Andersen
- 6th - Michaela Aycock
- 7th - Virginia Sanchez
- 8th - Janeen Lankowski
- 9th - Margita Zamolova
- 10th - Nadia Capotosto
- 11th - MayLa Ash
- 12th - Sheena Ohlig
- 13th - LaDawn McDay
- 14th - Silvia Matta
- 15th - Reshanna Boswell
- 16th - Leah Dennie

Comparison to previous Olympia results:

- Same - Andrea
- +1 - Helle
- -1 - Margie
- Same - Irene
- +7 - Janeen
- +1 - Margita
- -7 - MayLa
- -1 - LaDawn
- -6 - Reshanna

=== Scorecard ===
No	NAME	COUNTRY	TOTAL	PLACE
1	Irene Andersen	Sweden	25	5
2	MayLa Ash	USA	55	11
3	Michaela Aycock	USA	30	6
4	Reshanna Boswell	USA	73	15
5	Nadia Capotosto	Italy	47	10
6	Leah Dennie	USA	78	16
7	Janeen Lankowski	USA	39	8
8	Margie Martin	USA	15	3
9	Silvia Matta	Italy	72	14
10	LaDawn McDay	USA	67	13
11	Sheena Ohlig	USA	60	12
12	Mona Poursaleh	Canada	20	4
13	Virginia Sanchez	Spain	37	7
14	Helle Trevino	USA	10	2
15	Margita Zamolova	Czech Republic	46	9
16	Andrea Shaw	USA	5	1

== Attendees ==
- 5th Ms. Olympia attended - Helle Trevino
- 3rd Ms. Olympia attended - Margie Martin
- 2nd Ms. Olympia attended - Irene Andersen, MayLa Ash, Reshanna Boswell, Janeen Lankowski, LaDawn McDay, Andrea Shaw, and Margita Zamolova
- 1st Ms. Olympia attended - Michaela Aycock, Nadia Capotosto, Leah Dennie, Silvia Matta, Sheena Ohlig, Mona Poursaleh, and Virginia Sanchez

== Notable events ==
- Andrea Shaw won her second Ms. Olympia consecutively, trying with Rachel McLish's record two Ms. Olympia wins, along with trying with Larry Scott, Jay Culter and Mamdouh Elssbiay's record two consecutive Mr. Olympia wins, along with Franco Columbu's record two overall Mr. Olympia wins.
- The 2021 Ms. Olympia posedown changed to the top five contestants posing.

== 2021 Ms. Olympia Qualified ==
Name	Country	How Qualified
Virginia Sanchez	(Spain)	2020 IFBB Pro League Wings of Strength Romania Muscle Fest Pro Women's Bodybuilding - 1st
Andrea Shaw	(United States)	2020 Ms. Olympia - 1st
Margie Martin	(United States)	2020 Ms. Olympia - 2nd
Helle Trevino	(United States)	2020 Ms. Olympia - 3rd
MayLa Ash	(United States)	2020 Ms. Olympia - 4th
Irene Anderson	(Sweden)	2020 Ms. Olympia - 5th
Leah Dennie	(United States)	2021 IFBB Pro League New York Pro Women's Bodybuilding - 1st
Nadia Capostosto	(Italy)	2021 Wings of Strength (WOS) IFBB Pro League Yamamoto Nutrition Puerto Rico Women's Bodybuilding - 1st
Michaela Aycock	(United States)	2021 IFBB Pro League Omaha Pro Women's Bodybuilding - 1st
LaDawn McDay	(United States)	2021 IFBB Pro League Norfolk Women's Bodybuilding - 1st
Anastasia Leonova	(Russia)	2021 IFBB Pro League Mr. Big Evolution Pro Women's Bodybuilding - 1st
Sheena Ohlig	(United States)	2021 IFBB Pro League WOS Chicago Women's Bodybuilding - 1st
Mona Poursaleh	(Canada)	2021 IFBB Pro League Tampa Pro Women's Bodybuilding - 1st
Margita Zamolova	(Czech Republic)	2021 IFBB Pro League Europa Pro Women's Bodybuilding - 1st
Silvia Matta	(Italy)	2021 IFBB Pro League Europa Pro Women's Bodybuilding - 2nd
Reshanna Boswell	(United States)	2021 IFBB Pro League Savannah Pro Women's Bodybuilding - 1st
Janeen Lankowski	(United States)	2021 IFBB Pro League Norfolk Women's Bodybuilding - 2nd 2021 IFBB Pro League Tampa Pro Women's Bodybuilding - 3rd 2021 IFBB Savannah Pro Women's Bodybuilding - 2nd
Stephanie Flesher	(United States)	2021 IFBB Pro League WOS Chicago Women's Bodybuilding - 3rd 2021 IFBB Pro League Tampa Pro Women's Bodybuilding - 5th
Monique Jones	(United States)	2020 IFBB Pro League Wings of Strength Rising Phoenix Women's Bodybuilding - 3rd

=== Points standings ===
Ranking ^{1}	Name	Country	Points
1	Janeen Lankowski	(United States)	15
2	Stephanie Flesher	(United States)	10
3	Monique Jones	(United States)	9
4	Aleesha Young	(United States)	8
4	Hunter Henderson	(United States)	8
5	Tamara Makar	(United Kingdom)	7
5	Corinne Ingman	(United Kingdom)	7
6	Monica Gioiosa	(Italy)	6
6	Anne Sheehan	(United States)	6
6	Kristina Mendoza	(United States)	6
6	Julia Fory	(Germany)	6
6	Alcione Sanots	(Brazil)	6
7	Wendy Sanchez	(United States)	5
7	Heather Grace	(United States)	5
7	Vera Mikulcova	(Czech Republic)	5
7	Felicia Spatarescu	(Spain)	5
8	Stacey Nunez	(United States)	4
8	Jessica Martin	(United States)	4
8	Hulda Lopez	(Honduras)	4
8	Vanesa Lloria	(Spain)	4
8	Akemy Jones	(United States)	4
9	Anastasia Korableva	(Russia)	3
9	Susanna Jacobs	(United States)	3
9	Nicki Chartrand	(United States)	3
9	Traci Rugged	(United States)	3
9	Jeanie Welker	(United States)	3
10	Keisha Oliver	(United States)	2
10	Gabriela Pena de la Vega	(United States)	2
10	Lisa Kudrey	(Canada)	2
11	Shannon Rabon Perdikis	(United States)	1

^{1} In the event of a tie, the competitor with the best top five contest placings will be awarded the qualification. If both competitors have the same contest placings, than both will qualify for the Olympia.
