= Venetian Expo =

Convention center in Nevada, United States

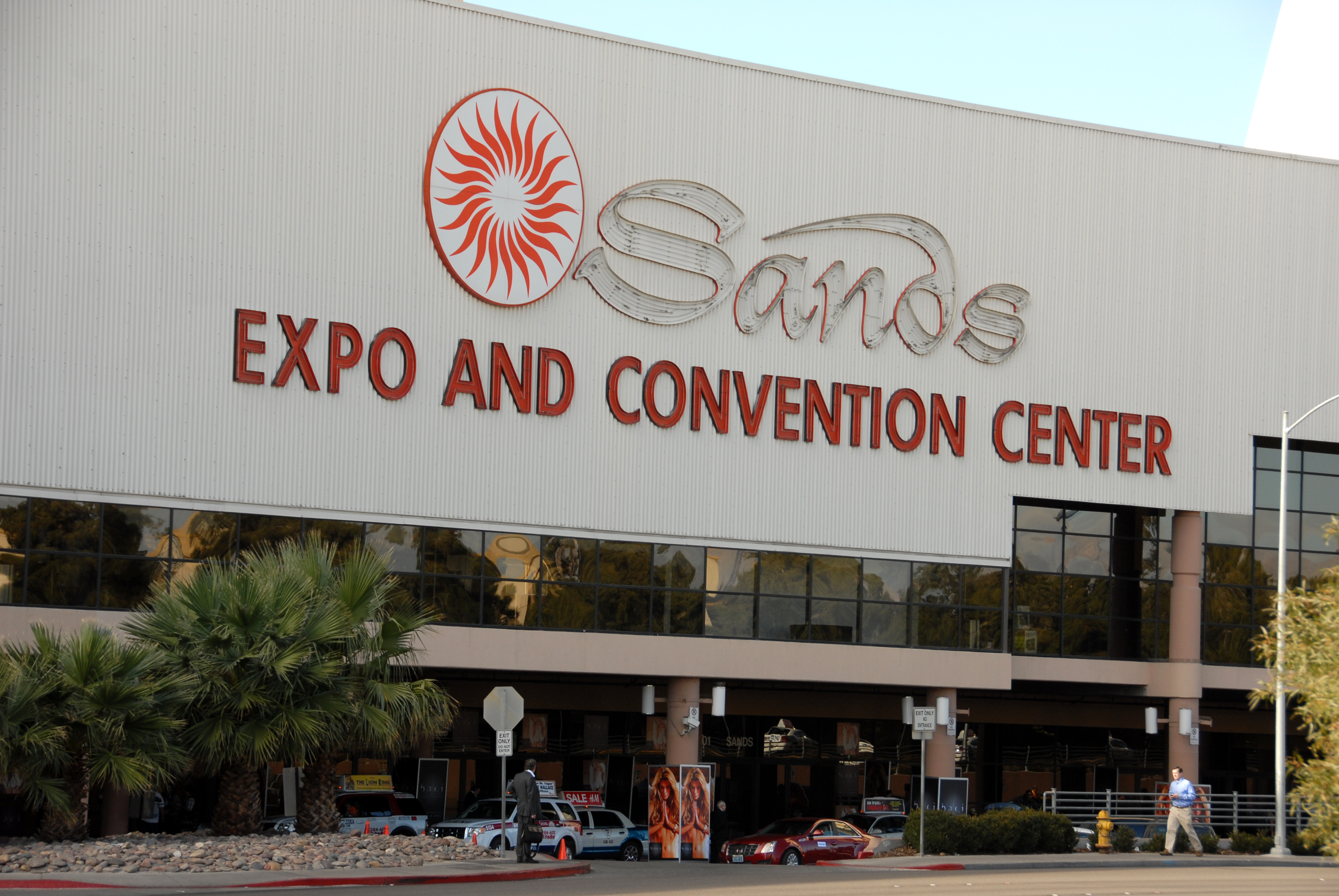
- Main entrance in 2010
- Interactive map of Venetian Expo
- Former names: Sands Expo (1990–2021)
- Address: 201 Sands Avenue
- Location: Paradise, Nevada, U.S.
- Coordinates: 36°07′18″N 115°09′57″W
- Owner: Vici Properties
- Operator: Apollo Global Management

Construction
- Opened: November 9, 1990
- Renovated: 2013
- Expanded: 2003

Website
- www.venetianlasvegas.com/meetings/

The Venetian Expo (also known as the Venetian Convention and Expo Center) is a convention center located in Paradise, Nevada, near the Las Vegas Strip. It is part of the Venetian and Palazzo resort complex, owned by Vici Properties and operated by Apollo Global Management.

The convention facility was developed by Las Vegas Sands and opened as the Sands Expo on November 9, 1990. It was built as part of the Sands Hotel, since replaced by the Venetian. The Sands Expo was renamed the Venetian Expo in 2021, while Vici and Apollo were in the process of purchasing it. The facility is frequently used for conventions booked at the Venetian and Palazzo. It is also used as overflow space for conventions that outgrow the Las Vegas Convention Center.

== History ==
In October 1989, the Sands Hotel received county approval for a convention center with approximately 1.1-million-square-foot, rivaling the Las Vegas Convention Center. The new facility was developed by Las Vegas Sands, owner of the Sands Hotel. Groundbreaking took place on November 12, 1989. The Sands Expo, located behind the hotel, opened on November 9, 1990. The COMDEX computer trade show was the first event held in the space. At its launch, it was the only privately owned and operated convention center in the United States, and was the second largest convention center in the world.

The Sands Hotel closed in 1996, and the Venetian resort opened in its place three years later. Since then, the Sands Expo has helped popularize Las Vegas as a convention city. An expansion was completed in 2003, and a $35 million renovation took place 10 years later, adding new carpeting, lighting and motion sensors as part of environmental efforts.

The convention center has 2.25-million sq ft (209,000 m^{2}). Notable events have included the Consumer Electronics Show, the Adult Entertainment Expo, and the Global Gaming Expo. In 2020, the 12th season of Shark Tank was filmed at the convention center.

In 2021, Las Vegas Sands announced that it would sell the Venetian-Palazzo complex, including the Sands Expo, to Vici Properties and Apollo Global Management. Under the deal, Vici owns the real estate while Apollo purchased the operations for the three facilities. Las Vegas Sands renamed the convention center as the Venetian Expo in September 2021, while still in the process of selling the facility. The sale was finalized in February 2022.
