= Ms. Olympia =

Professional bodybuilding competition

Ms. Olympia Miss Olympia (initially named)
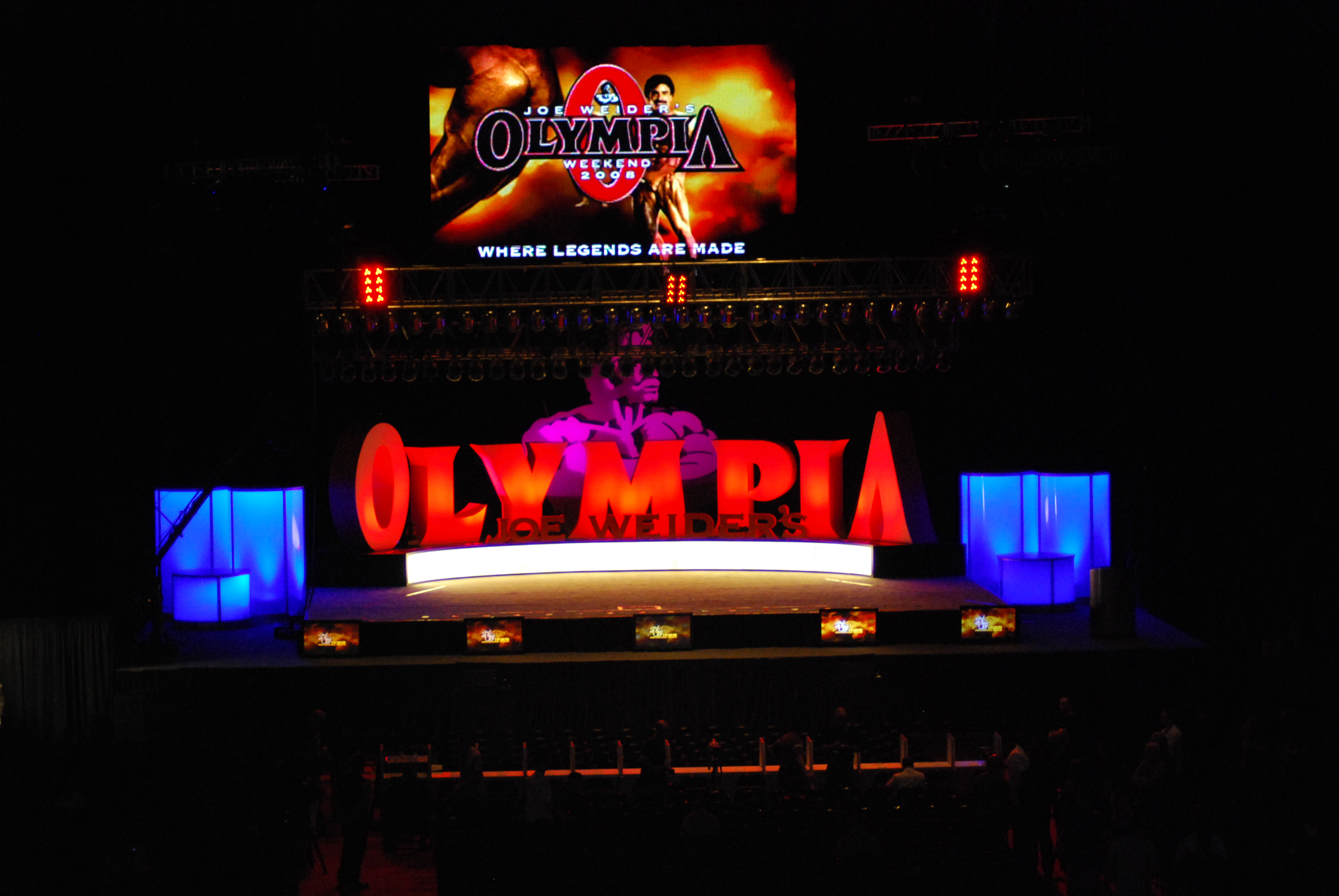
- The 2008 Ms. Olympia stage.
- Status: Active
- Genre: IFBB Professional League professional female bodybuilding (2005 – 2014 & 2020 – present) International Federation of BodyBuilding and Fitness (IFBB) professional female bodybuilding (mean; 1980–2004)
- Frequency: Annually
- Venue: Orange County Convention Center - West Concourse; 9800 International Dr, Orlando, Florida, United States of America 32819-8706
- Coordinates: 28.4249°N 81.4694°W
- Years active: 46
- Inaugurated: August 30, 1980
- Founder: George Snyder
- Most recent: 2025 Ms. Olympia
- Previous event: 2024 Ms. Olympia
- Next event: 2026 Ms. Olympia
- Participants: 15 Olympia Qualification System qualified IFBB Professional League professional female bodybuilders (mean; 2005 – 2014 & 2020 – present) 18 Olympia Qualification System qualified IFBB professional female bodybuilders (mean; 1980 – 2004)
- Attendance: 30,000 people (2013)
- Capacity: 6,000 people (Orange County Convention Center - West Concourse Valencia Ballroom)
- Area: International
- Major events: Spectator sport
- Promoters: Dan Solomon (2020 Ms. Olympia – present); Robin Chang (2004 Ms. Olympia – 2014 Ms. Olympia); Wayne DeMilia (2000 Ms. Olympia – 2003 Ms. Olympia); Bob Bonham and Kenny Kassel (1999 Ms. Olympia); Jarka Kastnerova (1998 Ms. Olympia); George Snyder (1980 Ms. Olympia – 1983 Ms. Olympia)
- Patrons: Bill Dobbins; Bill Jentz; Women's Physique World; Jagware Sportswear; Addict Activewear; Kaiser Nutrition; George Adant
- Organizer: IFBB Professional League (2005 – 2014 & 2020 – present) International Federation of BodyBuilding and Fitness (1980 – 2004)
- People: Jake Wood; David Pecker; Joseph Weider; Benjamin Weider
- Member: Joe Weider's Olympia Fitness & Performance Weekend (2000 – 2014 & 2020 – present) Women's Extravaganza Weekend (1999)
- Sponsors: Trifecta Inc. Wings of Strength, LLC; FitBurn; Northern Chill
- Website: mrolympia.com/ms-olympia

The IFBB Professional League Ms. Olympia (initially named the Miss Olympia) is female bodybuilding's most prestigious competition. The competition is part of Olympia Fitness & Performance Weekend It was first held in 1980. It was held as part of the Joe Weider's Olympia Fitness & Performance Weekend from 2000 to 2014 and since 2020.

The male professional bodybuilding equivalent of the Ms. Olympia is the Mr. Olympia. The natural professional female bodybuilding equivalent to the Ms. Olympia is the INBA/PNBA Natural Olympia. Rachel McLish won the first competition. In 2000, heavyweight and lightweight classes were added.

== History ==
=== 1980–1989 ===
In 1980 the first Ms. Olympia (initially known as the "Miss" Olympia) was held with Rachel McLish winning and becoming the first Ms. Olympia. McLish was dethroned by Ritva Elomaa in 1981, but regained the title in 1982. In the 1981 contest, the announcer and co-head judge Oscar State called out the wrong names for the poseoff segment, overlooking Laura Combes on the list which denied her those extra points.

George Snyder lost the rights to the Ms. Olympia in 1982, and after this the contestants were no longer hand-picked, but instead qualified for the Ms. Olympia through placings in lesser contests. As female bodybuilding grew and progressed, the competitors' level of training gradually increased, with most of the competitors in the earliest shows having very little weight training experience, and the sport slowly evolving towards more muscular physiques. This trend started to emerge in 1983 when with McLish not competing in the big shows, Carla Dunlap won the 1983 Ms. Olympia. Dunlap possessed a much more muscular physique than previous Ms. Olympia winners McLish or Elomaa.

In 1984, Corinna Everson won the Ms. Olympia title in Montreal, the first competition to be held outside the United States. Everson went on to win six consecutive Ms. Olympia titles in a row before retiring in 1989 undefeated as a professional, the only woman ever to accomplish this.

=== 1990–1999 ===
Normally competitors must qualify for the Ms. Olympia by achieving certain placings in lesser pro contests. However, the cancellation of the Women's Pro World contest in 1990 left only the Ms. International as a Ms. Olympia qualifier. Consequently, the IFBB decided to open the 1990 Ms. Olympia to all women with pro cards, and a field of thirty competitors entered. This was also the first Ms. Olympia without the incumbent Ms. Olympia champion defending her title.

Lenda Murray earned a decisive victory by winning the first Ms. Olympia competition she attended in 1990 and emerging as the successor to Everson. The 1991 Ms. Olympia was the first to be televised live. Murray barely edged out Bev Francis, a former Australian powerlifter, by a single point that year. Murray faced a serious challenge from Denise Rutkowski in 1993, and some argue that Rutkowski, not Murray, should have won that year. Rutkowski shocked the Ms. Olympia contest entourage and fans by retiring in 1994, just as her career was gaining mainstream popularity and her potential for winning a Ms. Olympia title was high.

In the 1996 Ms. Olympia, Murray, who had been six-time consecutive Ms. Olympia champion at that time, was dethroned by Kim Chizevsky. Chizevsky had previously placed 2nd in the 1995 Ms. Olympia, but her victory came as something of a surprise, since many had regarded Murray as virtually unbeatable. After being defeated by Chizevsky and placing second again in the 1997 Ms. Olympia, Murray retired from bodybuilding. Chizevsky went on to win the 1998 Ms. Olympia, held in Prague, the second and most recent time the competition had been held outside the United States.

==== 1992 Ms. Olympia changes ====
In response to the increased size displayed by Murray and Francis at the previous Ms. Olympia, the IFBB attempted to "feminize" the sport. The IFBB, led by Ben Weider, had created a series of "femininity" rules—one line in the judging rules said that competitors should not be "too big". The judges' guide to the competitors stated that they were looking for a feminine, but not emaciated, physique. Advertising in Muscle & Fitness for the 1992 Ms. Olympia featured Anja Schreiner of Germany prominently, relegating two-time defending champion Murray to a small "also competing" notice. Nevertheless, Murray apparently met the "femininity" requirements, and managed to retain her title; Schreiner finished 6th, and promptly retired from competition. After 1992, the judging rules were rewritten, with the new rules retaining provisions for aesthetics but allowing the contests to be judged as physique contests. Murray went on to win six consecutive Ms. Olympia titles from 1990 to 1995, matching Everson's record.

==== 1999 Ms. Olympia controversy and retirement ====
In 1999, Ms. Olympia was originally scheduled to be held on October 9 in Santa Monica, California. However, one month before the scheduled date, the IFBB announced that the contest had been canceled. The main cause was the withdrawal of promoter Jarka Kastnerova (who promoted the 1998 contest in Prague) for financial reasons, including a low number of advance ticket sales for the 1999 event. The backlash following the announcement led to a flurry of activity, with the contest being rescheduled as part of the Women's Extravaganza (promoted by Kenny Kassel and Bob Bonham) in Secaucus, New Jersey on 2 October. Last minute sponsorship came from several sources, most significantly in the form of $50,000 from Flex magazine. Amid all the turmoil, Chizevsky won her fourth consecutive Ms. Olympia title. Also notable about the 1999 Ms. Olympia was that this was the first Ms. Olympia Iris Kyle competed in. However, after the 1999 Ms. Olympia, Chizevsky was forced to retire from bodybuilding and began competing in fitness and figure competitions in 2001.

=== 2000–2005 ===
The 2001 Ms. Olympia featured a "surprise" win from Juliette Bergmann who returned to competition after not competing since 1989. Entering the Olympia as a lightweight, she defeated heavyweight winner Kyle for the overall title. In the five years that the Ms. Olympia was contested in multiple weight classes, this was the only time that the lightweight winner took the overall title.

After five-year absence, six-time Olympia winner Murray returned to the 2002 Ms. Olympia, with Bergmann won lightweight and Murray winning heavyweight and overall. Murray went on to win both the heavyweight and overall in the 2002 and 2003 Ms. Olympia. For the second time in her career, Murray was dethroned of her Ms. Olympia title by Kyle in 2004, who won the heavyweight and overall. After her 2004 Ms. Olympia defeat, Murray retired for the final time from bodybuilding.

==== 2000 Ms. Olympia changes ====
The IFBB introduced several changes to Ms. Olympia in 2000. The first change was that Ms. Olympia contest would no longer be held as a separate contest, instead became part of the "Olympia Weekend" in Las Vegas and held the day before the men's show. The second change was when heavyweight and lightweight classes were added. The third change was the new judging guidelines for presentations were introduced. A letter to the competitors from Jim Manion (chairman of the Professional Judges Committee) stated that women would be judged on healthy appearance, face, makeup, and skin tone. The criteria given in Manion's letter included the statement "symmetry, presentation, separations, and muscularity BUT NOT TO THE EXTREME!". The 2000 Ms. Olympia is the only Ms. Olympia with no overall winner, with Andrulla Blanchette winning lightweight class and Valentina Chepiga winning heavyweight class.

==== 2005 Ms. Olympia changes ====
On 6 December 2004, Manion issued a memo introducing the so-called '20 percent rule' to all IFBB professional female athletes. It read, "For aesthetics and health reasons, the IFBB Professional Division requests that female athletes in Bodybuilding, Fitness and Figure decrease the amount of muscularity by a factor of 20%. This request for a 20% decrease in the amount of muscularity applies to those female athletes whose physiques require the decrease regardless of whether they compete in Bodybuilding, Fitness or Figure. All professional judges have been advised of the proper criteria for assessing female physiques." Needless to say the directive created quite a stir, and left many women wondering if they were one of "those female athletes whose physiques require the decrease". On 26 April 2005, IFBB Professional Committee adopted, by a vote of 9 for, 1 against and 3 no votes, Resolution 2005-001, which removed weight classes to allow for one category only of competition in women's professional bodybuilding and that it would take effect at the 2005 Ms. Olympia.

According to Bill Dobbins, reports he heard that moving the Ms. Olympia from Friday night to Saturday in the Las Vegas Convention Center for free and as part of the Expo was an attempt to improve pay-per-view sales and removing weight divisions was based on the perception that the men and women bodybuilders should operate according to the same rules. He also stated that both decisions were led by A360 Media, LLC and Ben Weider and Joe Weider.

At the 2005 Ms. Olympia, Yaxeni Oriquen dethroned Kyle. According to Kyle, she normally competes at 160–162 lb (73–73 kg), but being the reigning Ms. Olympia she wanted to lead by example. At the 2005 Ms. Olympia, she stated she competed at 155 lb (70 kg), while Oriquen competed at 173 lb (78 kg) according to Steve Wennerstrom. Kyle commented that it looked like Oriquen had done the opposite of IFBB ADVISORY NOTICE 2004-006 and won because of it.

According to Dobbins, he commented that Kyle might have been slightly off from 2004 and looked a little too depleted or dehydrated compared to how she looked in previous Ms. Olympias, while Oriquen looked the best he had ever seen of her, but that the differences was very small. He also commented in the report that prior to the 2005 Ms. Olympia there was speculation about how the judging would be conducted, which centered on the idea that the IFBB didn't allow Kyle to win another Ms. Olympia title. He also stated that the decision wasn't primarily political and the Olympia audience wasn't outraged by the decision.

=== 2006–2014 ===
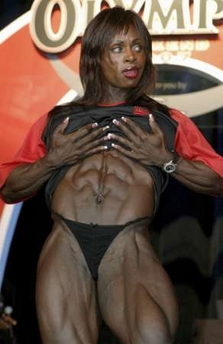
Dayana Cadeau posing against Iris Kyle at the 2007 Olympia Press Conference on 27 September 2007.

At the 2006 Ms. Olympia, Kyle, coming off beating the defending Ms. International champion Oriquen, reclaimed the Ms. Olympia title from defending Ms. Olympia champion Oriquen, who showed a dramatic drop in form and slipped to 7th place. Oriquen, who continue to compete at the Ms. Olympia competitions from 2007 to 2014 and 2020, would never again regain the Ms. Olympia title, but would remain in the top six of every Ms. Olympia from 2007 to 2014.

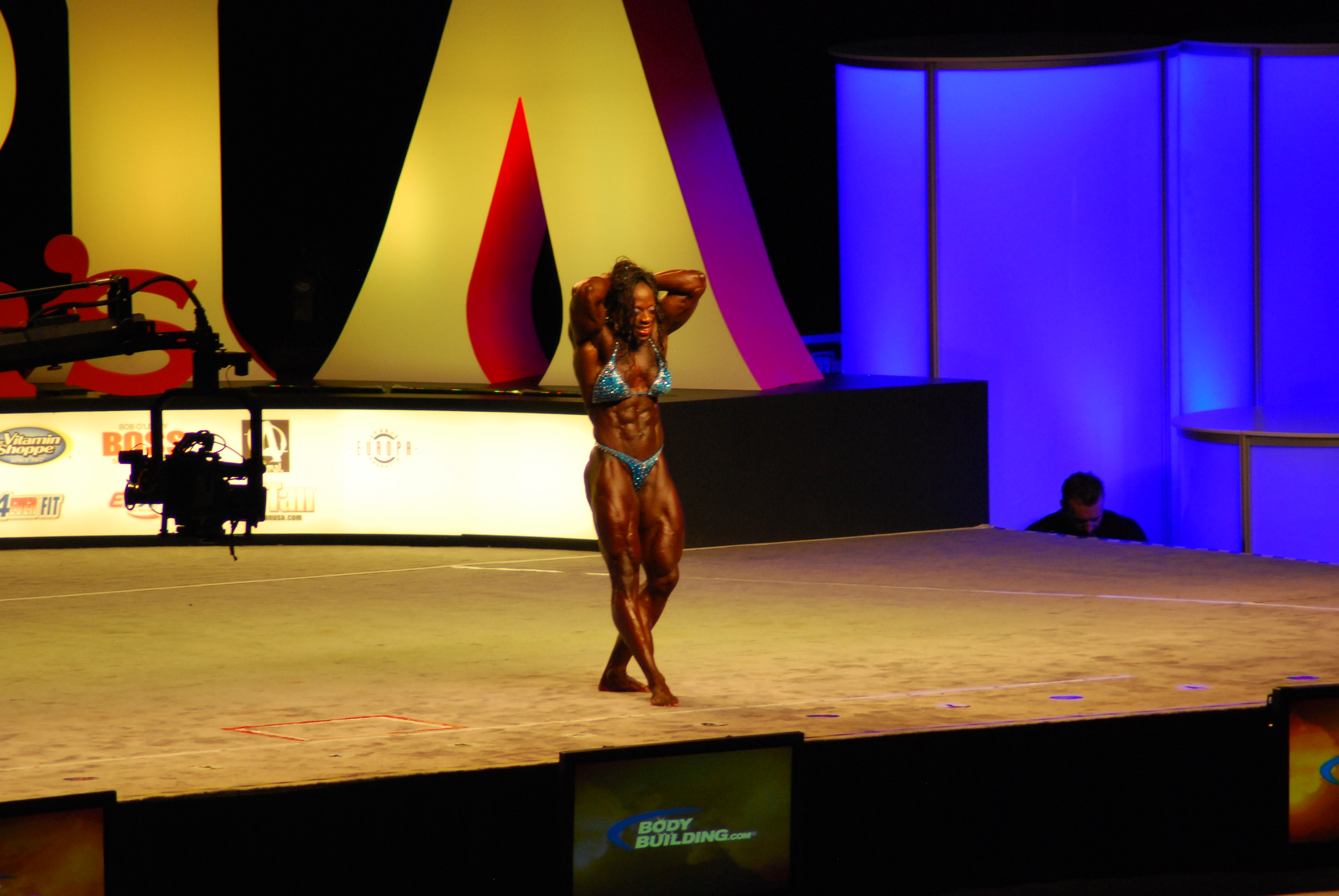
Iris Kyle posing during the September 26, 2008 Ms. Olympia finals.

From 2007 to 2014, Kyle went on to win the next 8 overall Ms. Olympia titles and winning 9 consecutive overall Ms. Olympia titles in a row. At the 2012 Ms. Olympia, she won her 8th overall Ms. Olympia title, tying with Murray's record of 8 overall and 2 heavyweight Ms. Olympia titles. At the 2013 Ms. Olympia, Kyle won her 9th overall Ms. Olympia title, beating Murray's record, which meant she won more Olympia titles than any other professional bodybuilder, female or male. According to John Plummer, editor of the Flex United Kingdom edition, commented that she looked "flat" in the pre-judging, while Alina Popa displayed "great, full muscle bellies". But he noted the audience gasped when Iris did her first back double biceps pose during the finals, revealing "trademark ripped glutes and unbeatable shape". At that point, he thought her victory was ensured. He noted some of the audience booed when Popa's second place was announced.

At the 2014 Ms. Olympia, Kyle solidified her record by winning her 10th overall Ms. Olympia title. This was her 9th consecutive overall Olympia titles in a row, beating both Lee Haney's and Ronnie Coleman's record of 8 consecutive overall Olympia titles in a row, which meant she won more consecutive overall Olympia titles in a row than any other professional bodybuilder, female or male. According to Plummer, he commented that Popa receiving 2nd place resulted in boos from the audience and that many felt she, who described was "well-conditioned" and had appeared to "out-muscle" Kyle, especially from the rear poses, should have got the Ms. Olympia title. But after a moment of boos, the audience showed affection for Kyle. She announced her retirement right after winning the title at the 2014 Ms. Olympia.

=== 2015–2019 hiatus ===
In 2014, International Fitness and Bodybuilding Federation (IFBB) announced that Ms. Olympia had been cancelled for 2015, with no explicit reason stated. In its place, the Rising Phoenix World Championships was developed by Wings of Strength. From 2015 to 2019, the Rising Phoenix was the de facto replacement.

After five years of being discontinued, on 14 September 2019, emcee Bob Chicherillo announced at the Joe Weider's Olympia Fitness & Performance Weekend 2019 that the Ms. Olympia would return to the Joe Weider's Olympia Fitness & Performance Weekend 2020.

=== 2020 – present ===
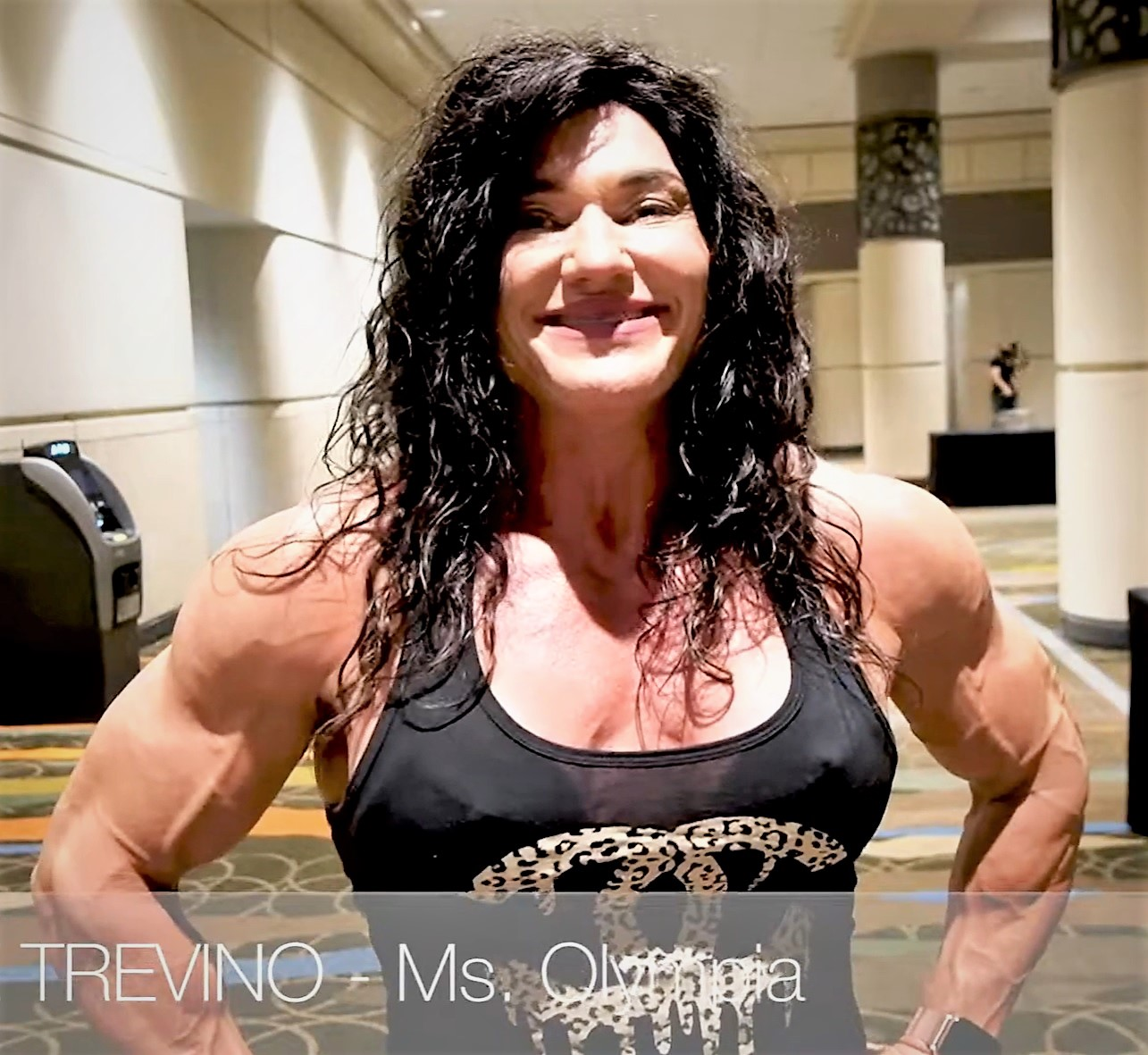
Helle Trevino finished top three in three consecutive years from 2020–2022.

On 14 February 2020, A360 Media, LLC sold Joe Weider's Olympia Fitness & Performance Weekend to Jake Wood, who also owned the Rising Phoenix, which had been the successor to Ms. Olympia. Due to the COVID-19 pandemic, the Joe Weider's Olympia Fitness & Performance Weekend was postponed to December 2020 and moved to the Orange County Convention Center in Orlando, Florida due to the limits the attendees in Nevada. In Nevada, due to pandemic restrictions, just 250 people could be in attendance, while in Florida, 2,500 people could be in attendance. Later in 2020, Andrea Shaw, a dark horse competitor coming off her previous 2020 wins at the Omaha Pro and Rising Phoenix, defeated Helle Trevino (the defending champion of women's bodybuilding as the 2017 and 2019 Rising Phoenix champion) and Margaret V. Martin, the 2015 and 2016 Rising Phoenix champion during that era it was the premier women's bodybuilding championship, and obtained the Ms. Olympia title (the first in the Jake Wood era). She would repeat her double wins at the Rising Phoenix and Ms. Olympia in 2021, 2022 and 2023. In 2021, the Joe Weider's Olympia Fitness & Performance Weekend remained in Orlando. In 2022, the Joe Weider's Olympia Fitness & Performance Weekend moved back to Las Vegas. In 2023, the Joe Weider's Olympia Fitness & Performance Weekend moved back to Orlando.

== Champions ==
=== Chronologically ===
Year	Ms. Olympia champions		Posedown music	Prize purse	Venue
1980	(United States) Rachel McLish			$10,000 + Trophies (1st, 2nd, 3rd place)	Sheraton Hotel Ballroom, Philadelphia, Pennsylvania (PA), United States of America (USA)
1981	(Finland) Ritva Elomaa			$25,000 + Trophies (1st, 2nd, 3rd place)	Sheraton Hotel Ballroom, Philadelphia, Pennsylvania (PA), United States of America (USA)
1982	(United States) Rachel McLish			$25,000 + Trophies (1st, 2nd, 3rd place)	Sheraton Hotel Ballroom, Atlantic City, New Jersey (NJ), USA
1983	(United States) Carla Dunlap			$25,000 + Trophies (1st, 2nd, 3rd place)	Warminster Civic Center, Warminster, PA, USA
1984	(United States) Corinna Everson		Caribbean Queen (No More Love on the Run) by Billy Ocean and Keith Diamond	$50,000 + Trophies (1st, 2nd, 3rd place)	Place des Arts, Montreal, Quebec, Canada
1985	(United States) Corinna Everson		Take On Me by A-ha	$50,000 + Trophies (1st, 2nd, 3rd place)	Felt Forum, New York City (NYC), New York (NY), USA
1986	(United States) Corinna Everson		Tuff Enuff by The Fabulous Thunderbirds	$50,000 + Trophies (1st, 2nd, 3rd place)	Felt Forum, New York City (NYC), New York (NY), USA
1987	(United States) Corinna Everson		The Final Countdown by Europe	$50,000 + Trophies (1st, 2nd, 3rd place)	Beacon Theatre, NYC, NY, USA
1988	(United States) Corinna Everson		Wild Side by Mötley Crüe	$60,000 + Trophies (1st, 2nd, 3rd place)	Felt Forum, NYC, NY, USA
1989	(United States) Corinna Everson		Rhythm Nation by Janet Jackson	$71,000 + Trophies (1st, 2nd, 3rd place)	Felt Forum, NYC, NY, USA
1990	(United States) Lenda Murray			$85,000 + Trophies (1st, 2nd, 3rd place)	Felt Forum, NYC, NY, USA
1991	(United States) Lenda Murray			$93,500 + Trophies (1st, 2nd, 3rd place)	Shrine Auditorium and Expo Hall, Los Angeles, California, USA
1992	(United States) Lenda Murray		The Best Things in Life Are Free (Mo' Money/Soundtrack Version) by Janet Jackson, Luther Vandross, Ralph Tresvant and Bell Biv DeVoe	$108,500 + Trophies (1st, 2nd, 3rd place)	Arie Crown Theater, Chicago (CHI), Illinois (IL), USA
1993	(United States) Lenda Murray		Dirty House Mix 1# by DVDL	$95,000 + Trophies (1st, 2nd, 3rd place)	Beacon Theatre, NYC, NY, USA
1994	(United States) Lenda Murray		Unbelievable by EMF	$90,000 + Trophies (1st, 2nd, 3rd place)	Cobb Civic Center, Atlanta, Georgia, USA
1995	(United States) Lenda Murray		Twilight Zone by 2 Unlimited	$115,000 + Trophies (1st, 2nd, 3rd place)	Cobb Civic Center, Atlanta, Georgia, USA
1996	(United States) Kim Chizevsky		Unbelievable by EMF	$104,500 + Trophies (1st, 2nd, 3rd place)	Arie Crown Theater, CHI, IL, USA
1997	(United States) Kim Chizevsky		All I Really Want by Alanis Morissette and Glen Ballard	$101,000 + Trophies (1st, 2nd, 3rd place)	Manhattan Center, NYC, NY, USA
1998	(United States) Kim Chizevsky		Too Funky by George Michael	$50,000 + Trophies (1st, 2nd, 3rd place)	Industrial Palace, Prague, Czech Republic
1999	(United States) Kim Chizevsky		War by Vince DiCola	$50,000 + Trophies (1st, 2nd, 3rd place)	Meadowlands Convention Center, Secaucus, New Jersey (NJ), USA
2000	(Ukraine) Valentina Chepiga (heavyweight (HW))	(United Kingdom) Andrulla Blanchette (lightweight (LW))	Music by Madonna (lightweight posedown); Hokey Pokey by The Puppies (heavyweight posedown)	$50,000 + Trophies (1st (HW & LW), 2nd (HW & LW), 3rd place (HW & LW)	Mandalay Bay Arena, Paradise (PAR), Nevada (NV), USA
2001	(Netherlands) Juliette Bergmann (Overall (OA) & (LW))	(United States) Iris Kyle (HW)	Tom Sawyer by Rush (top six posedown); It's My Life by Bon Jovi (OA posedown)	$50,000 + Trophies (1st (HW & LW), 2nd (HW & LW), 3rd place (HW & LW)	Mandalay Bay Arena, Paradise (PAR), Nevada (NV), USA
2002	(United States) Lenda Murray (OA & HW)	(Netherlands) Juliette Bergmann (LW)	Keep Away by Godsmack (top six posedown)	$71,000 + Trophies (OA, 1st (HW & LW), 2nd (HW & LW), 3rd place (HW & LW)	Mandalay Bay Arena, Paradise (PAR), Nevada (NV), USA
2003	(United States) Lenda Murray (OA & HW)	(Netherlands) Juliette Bergmann (LW)	Hot in Herre by Nelly (top six posedown); Feel It Boy by Beenie Man and Janet Jackson (OA posedown)	$50,000 + Trophies (OA, 1st (HW & LW), 2nd (HW & LW), 3rd place (HW & LW)	Mandalay Bay Arena, Paradise (PAR), Nevada (NV), USA
2004	(United States) Iris Kyle (OA & HW)	(Canada) Dayana Cadeau (LW)	Don't Stop The Rock by The Chemical Brothers (lightweight posedown); Move Somethin' by LL Cool J / Word Up! by Korn / Frantic by Metallica (heavyweight posedown); Rollover DJ by Jet (OA posedown)	$50,000 + Trophies (OA, 1st (HW & LW), 2nd (HW & LW), 3rd place (HW & LW)	Mandalay Bay Arena, Paradise (PAR), Nevada (NV), USA
2005	(Venezuela) Yaxeni Oriquen		Stupify by Disturbed	$71,000 + Trophies (1st, 2nd, 3rd place)	Las Vegas Convention Center, Winchester (WIN), NV, USA; The Orleans, PAR, NV, USA
2006	(United States) Iris Kyle		Panama by Van Halen	$71,000 + Trophies (1st, 2nd, 3rd place)	Las Vegas Convention Center, Winchester (WIN), NV, USA; The Orleans, PAR, NV, USA
2007	(United States) Iris Kyle		Hush by Kula Shaker	$71,000 + Trophies (1st, 2nd, 3rd place)	Las Vegas Convention Center, Winchester (WIN), NV, USA; The Orleans, PAR, NV, USA
2008	(United States) Iris Kyle		Can't Get Through by Miguel Migs	$71,000 + Trophies (1st, 2nd, 3rd place)	Las Vegas Convention Center, Winchester (WIN), NV, USA; The Orleans, PAR, NV, USA
2009	(United States) Iris Kyle		Fire Burning by Sean Kingston	$61,000 + Trophies (1st, 2nd, 3rd place)	Las Vegas Convention Center, Winchester (WIN), NV, USA; The Orleans, PAR, NV, USA
2010	(United States) Iris Kyle		Bring Em Out by T.I.	$60,000 + Trophies (1st, 2nd, 3rd place)	Las Vegas Convention Center, Winchester (WIN), NV, USA; The Orleans, PAR, NV, USA
2011	(United States) Iris Kyle		S&M by Rihanna and Britney Spears	$60,000 + Trophies (1st, 2nd, 3rd place)	Las Vegas Convention Center, Winchester (WIN), NV, USA; The Orleans, PAR, NV, USA
2012	(United States) Iris Kyle		Gasolina by Daddy Yankee, Lil Jon, Pitbull and N.O.R.E.	$60,000 + Trophies (1st, 2nd, 3rd place)	Las Vegas Convention Center, Winchester (WIN), NV, USA; The Orleans, PAR, NV, USA
2013	(United States) Iris Kyle		C'mon by Tiësto and Diplo	$60,000 + Trophies (1st, 2nd, 3rd place)	Las Vegas Convention Center, Winchester (WIN), NV, USA; The Orleans, PAR, NV, USA
2014	(United States) Iris Kyle		Stronger by Kanye West	$50,000 + Trophies (1st, 2nd, 3rd place)	Las Vegas Convention Center, Winchester (WIN), NV, USA; The Orleans, PAR, NV, USA
2020	(United States) Andrea Shaw		Everybody (Backstreet's Back) by Backstreet Boys	$95,000 + Trophies (1st, 2nd, 3rd place)	Orange County Convention Center, Orlando (ORL), Florida (FL), USA
2021	(United States) Andrea Shaw		Tootsie Roll by Old School Players	$89,000 + Trophies (1st, 2nd, 3rd place)	Orange County Convention Center, Orlando (ORL), Florida (FL), USA
2022	(United States) Andrea Shaw		Unstoppable by E.S. Posthumus; U Can't Touch This by MC Hammer; Flex by The Party Boyz	$95,000 + Trophies (1st, 2nd, 3rd place)	The Venetian Expo & Convention Center and the Zappos Theater, Planet Hollywood Resort & Casino, PAR, NV, USA
2023	(United States) Andrea Shaw		Burn by 2WEI & Edda Hayes; Walk It Out by Unk	$95,000 + Trophies (1st, 2nd, 3rd place)	Orange County Convention Center, ORL, FL, USA
2024	(United States) Andrea Shaw			$95,000 + Trophies (1st, 2nd, 3rd place)	Las Vegas Convention Center (prejudging) & Resorts World Theatre (finals), PAR, NV, USA
2025	(United States) Andrea Shaw				
2026					

=== Number of wins ===
Rank	Champions	Years	Number of wins		
Rank	Champions	Years	Overall	Heavyweight	Lightweight
1st	(United States) Iris Kyle	2001, 2004 & 2006 – 2014	10	2	0
2nd	(United States) Lenda Murray	1990 – 1995 & 2002 – 2003	8	2	0
3rd	(United States) Andrea Shaw	2020 – 2026	7		0
4th	(United States) Corinna Everson	1984 – 1989	6	0	0
5th	(United States) Kim Chizevsky	1996 – 1999	4	0	0
6th	(United States) Rachel McLish	1980 & 1982	2	0	0
7th	(Netherlands) Juliette Bergmann	2001 – 2003	1	0	3
8th	(Finland) Ritva Elomaa	1981	1	0	0
8th	(United States) Carla Dunlap	1983	1	0	0
8th	(Venezuela) Yaxeni Oriquen	2005	1	0	0
9th	(Ukraine) Valentina Chepiga	2000	0	1	0
9th	(United Kingdom) Andrulla Blanchette	2000	0	0	1
9th	(Canada) Dayana Cadeau	2004	0	0	1

=== Number of consecutive wins ===
Rank	Champions	Years	Number of consecutive wins		
Rank	Champions	Years	Overall	Heavyweight	Lightweight
1st	(United States) Iris Kyle	2006 – 2014	9	0	0
2nd	(United States) Andrea Shaw	2020 – 2026	7	0	0
3rd	(United States) Corinna Everson	1984 – 1989	6	0	0
3rd	(United States) Lenda Murray	1990 – 1995	6	0	0
5th	(United States) Kim Chizevsky	1996 – 1999	4	0	0
6th	(United States) Lenda Murray	2002 – 2003	2	2	0
7th	(Netherlands) Juliette Bergmann	2001 – 2003	0		3

=== Top three ===
Year	Ms. Olympia champions	Runner−up	3rd place
1980	(United States) Rachel McLish	(United States) Auby Paulick	(United States) Lynn Conkwright
1981	(Finland) Ritva Elomaa	(United States) Rachel McLish	(United States) Lynn Conkwright
1982	(United States) Rachel McLish	(United States) Carla Dunlap	(Finland) Ritva Elomaa
1983	(United States) Carla Dunlap	(United States) Candy Csencsits	(Sweden) Inger Zetterqvist
1984	(United States) Corinna Everson	(United States) Rachel McLish	(United States) Mary Roberts
1985	(United States) Corinna Everson	(United States) Mary Roberts	(United States) Diana Dennis
1986	(United States) Corinna Everson	(United States) Clare Furr	(Netherlands) Ellen van Maris
1987	(United States) Corinna Everson	(Netherlands) Ellen van Maris	(Australia) Bev Francis
1988	(United States) Corinna Everson	(West Germany) Anja Langer	(Australia) Bev Francis
1989	(United States) Corinna Everson	(United States) Sandy Riddell	(Australia) Bev Francis
1990	(United States) Lenda Murray	(Australia) Bev Francis	(Germany) Anja Langer
1991	(United States) Lenda Murray	(Australia) Bev Francis	(United States) Laura Creavalle
1992	(United States) Lenda Murray	(United States) Laura Creavalle	(United States) Shelley Beattie
1993	(United States) Lenda Murray	(United States) Denise Rutkowski	(United States) Laura Creavalle
1994	(United States) Lenda Murray	(United States) Laura Creavalle	(United States) Debbie Muggli
1995	(United States) Lenda Murray	(United States) Kim Chizevsky	(Lithuania) Natalia Murnikoviene
1996	(United States) Kim Chizevsky	(United States) Lenda Murray	(Lithuania) Natalia Murnikoviene
1997	(United States) Kim Chizevsky	(United States) Lenda Murray	(United States) Yolanda Hughes
1998	(United States) Kim Chizevsky	(United States) Yolanda Hughes	(United States) Ondrea Gates
1999	(United States) Kim Chizevsky	(United States) Ondrea Gates	(United States) Laura Creavalle
2000	(Ukraine) Valentina Chepiga (Heavyweight (HW)) (United Kingdom) Andrulla Blanchette (Lightweight (LW))	(United States) Ondrea Gates (HW) (United States) Brenda Raganot (LW)	(United States) Lesa Lewis (HW) (United States) Renee Casella (LW)
2001	(Netherlands) Juliette Bergmann (Overall (OA) & LW) (United States) Iris Kyle (HW)	(United Kingdom) Andrulla Blanchette (LW) (United States) Ondrea Gates (HW)	(Canada) Dayana Cadeau (LW) (Venezuela) Yaxeni Oriquen (HW)
2002	(United States) Lenda Murray (OA & HW) (Netherlands) Juliette Bergmann (LW)	(United States) Iris Kyle (HW) (Ukraine) Valentina Chepiga (LW)	(United States) Ondrea Gates (HW) (Venezuela) Fannie Barrios (LW)
2003	(United States) Lenda Murray (OA & HW) (Netherlands) Juliette Bergmann (LW)	(United States) Iris Kyle (HW) (Canada) Dayana Cadeau (LW)	(Venezuela) Yaxeni Oriquen (HW) (United States) Denise Masino (LW)
2004	(United States) Iris Kyle (OA & HW) (Canada) Dayana Cadeau (LW)	(United States) Lenda Murray (HW) (United States) Denise Masino (LW)	(Venezuela) Yaxeni Oriquen (HW) (Finland) Marja Lehtonen (LW)
2005	(Venezuela) Yaxeni Oriquen	(United States) Iris Kyle	(Canada) Dayana Cadeau
2006	(United States) Iris Kyle	(Canada) Dayana Cadeau	(United States) Annie Rivieccio
2007	(United States) Iris Kyle	(Canada) Dayana Cadeau	(Venezuela) Yaxeni Oriquen-Garcia
2008	(United States) Iris Kyle	(Venezuela) Betty Viana-Adkins	(Venezuela) Yaxeni Oriquen-Garcia
2009	(United States) Iris Kyle	(United States) Heather Armbrust	(United States) Debi Laszewski
2010	(United States) Iris Kyle	(Venezuela) Yaxeni Oriquen-Garcia	(United States) Debi Laszewski
2011	(United States) Iris Kyle	(Venezuela) Yaxeni Oriquen-Garcia	(Slovenia) Brigita Brezovac
2012	(United States) Iris Kyle	(United States) Debi Laszewski	(Venezuela) Yaxeni Oriquen-Garcia
2013	(United States) Iris Kyle	(Romania) Alina Popa	(United States) Debi Laszewski
2014	(United States) Iris Kyle	(Romania) Alina Popa	(United States) Debi Laszewski
2020	(United States) Andrea Shaw	(United States) Margaret V. Martin	(United States) Helle Trevino
2021	(United States) Andrea Shaw	(United States) Helle Trevino	(United States) Margaret V. Martin
2022	(United States) Andrea Shaw	(United States) Angela Yeo	(United States) Helle Trevino
2023	(United States) Andrea Shaw	(United States) Angela Yeo	(Brazil) Alcione Santos Barreto
2024	(United States) Andrea Shaw	(United States) Angela Yeo	(United States) Ashley Lynnette Jones
2025	(United States) Andrea Shaw	(United States) Ashley Lynnette Jones	(Brazil) Leyvina Rodrigues Barros
2026	(United States) Andrea Shaw	(United States) Ashley Lynnette Jones	(Brazil) Leyvina Rodrigues Barros

=== Medals by nation ===
Rank	Nation	Gold	Silver	Bronze	Total
1	United States (USA)	41	34	26	101
2	Netherlands (NED)	4	1	1	6
3	Venezuela (VEN)	1	3	7	11
4	Canada (CAN)	1	3	2	6
5	Great Britain (GBR)	1	1	0	2
5	Ukraine (UKR)	1	1	0	2
7	Finland (FIN)	1	0	2	3
8	Australia (AUS)	0	2	3	5
9	Romania (ROU)	0	2	0	2
10	Germany (DEU)	0	1	1	2
11	Brazil (BRA)	0	0	2	2
11	Lithuania (LTU)	0	0	2	2
13	Slovenia (SVN)	0	0	1	1
13	Sweden (SWE)	0	0	1	1
Totals (14 entries)		50	48	48	146

=== Other records ===
- Closest Ms. Olympia scores - 1991 Ms. Olympia (overall) with a margin of 1 / 2001 Ms. Olympia (heavyweight) with a margin of 0 / 2003 Ms. Olympia (lightweight) with a margin of 4
- Heaviest Ms. Olympia - Andrea Shaw (175 lb (79 kg))
- Lightest Ms. Olympia - Ritva Elomaa (117 lb (53 kg))
- Ms. Olympia with highest number of perfect win scores - Iris Kyle with 7
- Ms. Olympia with largest biceps - Andrea Shaw (18 in (46 cm))
- Oldest Ms. Olympia overall (OA) - Lenda Murray (41 years old; 2003 Ms. Olympia)
  - Oldest Ms. Olympia lightweight (LW) - Juliette Bergmann (44 years old; 2003 Ms. Olympia)
  - Oldest Ms. Olympia heavyweight (HW) - Lenda Murray (41 years old; 2003 Ms. Olympia)
- Smallest Ms. Olympia - Carla Dunlap / Andrulla Blanchette / Juliette Bergmann (5 ft 3 in (1.60 m))
- Tallest Ms. Olympia - Corinna Everson (5 ft 9 in (1.75 m))
- Youngest Ms. Olympia OA - Rachel McLish (25 years old; 1980 Ms. Olympia)
  - Youngest Ms. Olympia HW - Iris Kyle (27 years old; 2001 Ms. Olympia)
  - Youngest Ms. Olympia LW - Andrulla Blanchette (34 years old; 2000 Ms. Olympia)

== Fitness Olympia ==
=== Winners ===
#	Year	Winner	Venue
1	1995	(United States) Mia Finnegan	Atlanta, United States
2	1996	(Denmark) Saryn Muldrow	Chicago, United States
3	1997	(United States) Carol Semple	New York, United States
4	1998	(United States) Monica Brant	Nice, France
5	1999	(United States) Mary Yockey	Las Vegas, United States
6	2000	(United States) Susie Curry	Las Vegas, United States
7	2001	(United States) Susie Curry	Las Vegas, United States
8	2002	(United States) Susie Curry	Las Vegas, United States
9	2003	(United States) Susie Curry	Las Vegas, United States
10	2004	(United States) Adela García	Las Vegas, United States
11	2005	(United States) Jen Hendershott	Las Vegas, United States
12	2006	(United States) Adela García	Las Vegas, United States
13	2007	(United States) Adela García	Las Vegas, United States
14	2008	(United States) Jen Hendershott	Las Vegas, United States
15	2009	(United States) Adela García	Las Vegas, United States
16	2010	(United States) Adela García	Las Vegas, United States
17	2011	(United States) Adela García	Las Vegas, United States
18	2012	(United States) Adela García	Las Vegas, United States
19	2013	(United States) Adela García	Las Vegas, United States
20	2014	(Russia) Oksana Grishina	Las Vegas, United States
21	2015	(Russia) Oksana Grishina	Las Vegas, United States
22	2016	(Russia) Oksana Grishina	Las Vegas, United States
23	2017	(Russia) Oksana Grishina	Las Vegas, United States
24	2018	(United States) Whitney Jones	Las Vegas, United States
25	2019	(United States) Whitney Jones	Las Vegas, United States
26	2020	(United States) Missy Farrell Truscott	Orlando, United States
27	2021	(United States) Whitney Jones	Orlando, United States
28	2022	(United States) Missy Farrell Truscott	Las Vegas, United States
29	2023	(Russia) Oksana Grishina	Orlando, United States
30	2024	(United States) Missy Farrell Truscott	Las Vegas, United States
31	2025	(United Kingdom) Michelle Fredua-Mensah	Las Vegas, United States

=== Top 3 ===
Year	Winner	Second place	Third place	Venue
1995	(United States) Mia Finnegan	(United States) Carol Semple	(Denmark) Saryn Muldrow	Atlanta, United States
1996	(Denmark) Saryn Muldrow	(United States) Mia Finnegan	(United States) Karen Hulse	Chicago, United States
1997	(United States) Carol Semple	(Denmark) Saryn Muldrow	(Norway) Lena Johannesen	New York, United States
1998	(United States) Monica Brant	(United States) Susie Curry	(United States) Mary Yockey	Nice, France
1999	(United States) Mary Yockey	(United States) Kelly Ryan	(United States) Susie Curry	Las Vegas, United States
2000	(United States) Susie Curry	(United States) Kelly Ryan	(United States) Jennifer Worth	Las Vegas, United States
2001	(United States) Susie Curry	(United States) Jennifer Worth	(United States) Kelly Ryan	Las Vegas, United States
2002	(United States) Susie Curry	(United States) Kelly Ryan	(United States) Jennifer Worth	Las Vegas, United States
2003	(United States) Susie Curry	(United States) Kelly Ryan	(United States) Adela García	Las Vegas, United States
2004	(United States) Adela García	(United States) Jen Hendershott	(United States) Kelly Ryan	Las Vegas, United States
2005	(United States) Jen Hendershott	(United States) Kim Klein	(United States) Adela García	Las Vegas, United States
2006	(United States) Adela García	(United States) Kim Klein	(United States) Jen Hendershott	Las Vegas, United States
2007	(United States) Adela García	(United States) Kim Klein	(United States) Jen Hendershott	Las Vegas, United States
2008	(United States) Jen Hendershott	(United States) Tracey Greenwood	(United States) Kim Scheidelerd	Las Vegas, United States
2009	(United States) Adela García	(United States) Tanji Johnson	(United States) Tracey Greenwood	Las Vegas, United States
2010	(United States) Adela García	(United States) Tanji Johnson	(United States) Trish Warren	Las Vegas, United States
2011	(United States) Adela García	(United States) Tanji Johnson	(Canada) Myriam Capes	Las Vegas, United States
2012	(United States) Adela García	(Russia) Oksana Grishina	(United States) Tina Durkin	Las Vegas, United States
2013	(United States) Adela García	(Russia) Oksana Grishina	(United States) Tanji Johnson	Las Vegas, United States
2014	(Russia) Oksana Grishina	(Brazil) Regiane da Silva	(United States) Tanji Johnson	Las Vegas, United States
2015	(Russia) Oksana Grishina	(United States) Tanji Johnson	(Canada) Myriam Capes	Las Vegas, United States
2016	(Russia) Oksana Grishina	(United States) Tanji Johnson	(Brazil) Regiane da Silva	Las Vegas, United States
2017	(Russia) Oksana Grishina	(Canada) Myriam Capes	(Brazil) Regiane da Silva	Las Vegas, United States
2018	(United States) Whitney Jones	(Canada) Ryall Graber	(Canada) Myriam Capes	Las Vegas, United States
2019	(United States) Whitney Jones	(United States) Missy Farrell Truscott	(Canada) Ryall Graber	Las Vegas, United States
2020	(United States) Missy Farrell Truscott	(Russia) Oksana Grishina	(United States) Whitney Jones	Orlando, United States
2021	(United States) Whitney Jones	(United States) Missy Farrell Truscott	(Russia) Oksana Grishina	Orlando, United States
2022	(United States) Missy Farrell Truscott	(United States) Jaclyn Baker	(United States) Ariel Khadr	Las Vegas, United States
2023	(Russia) Oksana Grishina	(Canada) Taylor Learmont	(United States) Jaclyn Baker	Orlando, United States
2024	(United States) Missy Farrell Truscott	(United States) Jaclyn Baker	(Canada) Taylor Learmont	Las Vegas, United States
2025	(United Kingdom) Michelle Fredua-Mensah	(United States) Jaclyn Baker	(Canada) Taylor Learmont	Las Vegas, United States

== Figure Olympia ==
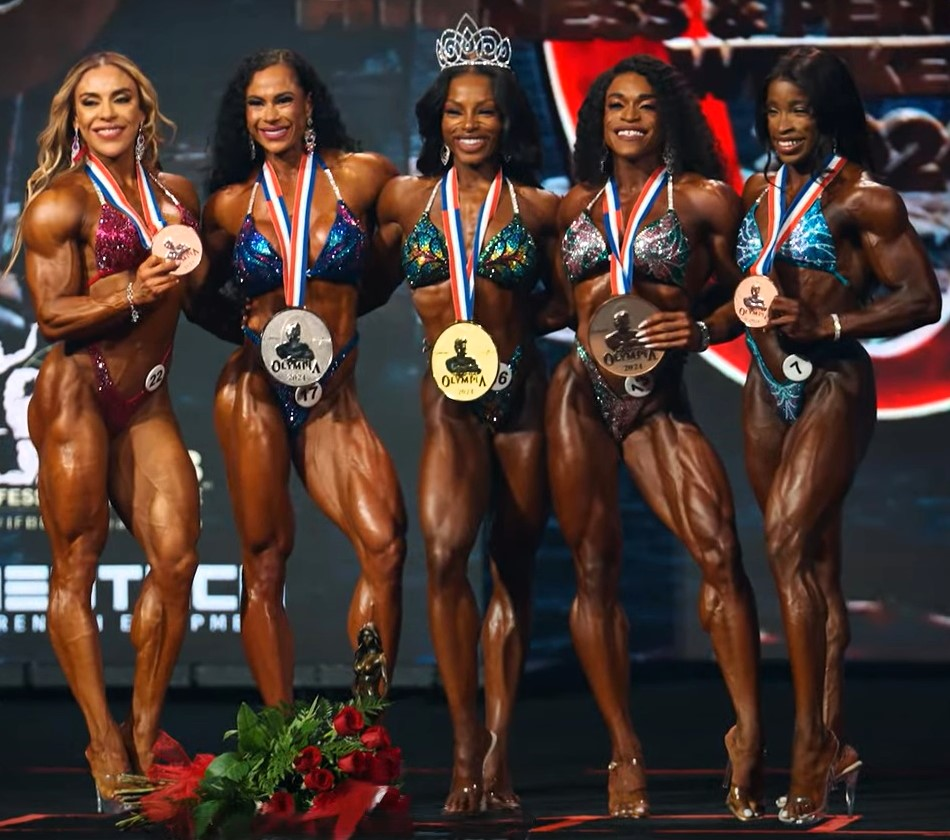
2024 Figure Olympia medalists (l to r): fourth place Natalia Soltero, second place Jessica Reyes Padilla, first place Cydney Gillon, third place Lola Montez, fifth place Rhea Gayle

=== Winners ===
#	Year	Winner	Venue
1	2003	(United States) Davana Medina	Las Vegas, United States
2	2004	(United States) Davana Medina	Las Vegas, United States
3	2005	(United States) Davana Medina	Las Vegas, United States
4	2006	(United States) Jenny Lynn	Las Vegas, United States
5	2007	(United States) Jenny Lynn	Las Vegas, United States
6	2008	(United States) Jennifer Gates	Las Vegas, United States
7	2009	(United States) Nicole Wilkins	Las Vegas, United States
8	2010	(United States) Erin Stern	Las Vegas, United States
9	2011	(United States) Nicole Wilkins	Las Vegas, United States
10	2012	(United States) Erin Stern	Las Vegas, United States
11	2013	(United States) Nicole Wilkins	Las Vegas, United States
12	2014	(United States) Nicole Wilkins	Las Vegas, United States
13	2015	(United States) Latorya Watts	Las Vegas, United States
14	2016	(United States) Latorya Watts	Las Vegas, United States
15	2017	(United States) Cydney Gillon	Las Vegas, United States
16	2018	(United States) Cydney Gillon	Las Vegas, United States
17	2019	(United States) Cydney Gillon	Las Vegas, United States
18	2020	(United States) Cydney Gillon	Orlando, United States
19	2021	(United States) Cydney Gillon	Orlando, United States
20	2022	(United States) Cydney Gillon	Las Vegas, United States
21	2023	(United States) Cydney Gillon	Orlando, United States
22	2024	(United States) Cydney Gillon	Las Vegas, United States
23	2025	(United Kingdom) Rhea Gayle	Las Vegas, United States

=== Top 3 ===
Year	Winner	Second place	Third place	Venue
2003	(United States) Davana Medina	(United States) Monica Brant	(United States) Jenny Lynn	Las Vegas, United States
2004	(United States) Davana Medina	(United States) Jenny Lynn	(United States) Monica Brant	Las Vegas, United States
2005	(United States) Davana Medina	(United States) Jenny Lynn	(United States) Monica Brant	Las Vegas, United States
2006	(United States) Jenny Lynn	(United States) Amber Littlejohn	(United States) Monica Brant	Las Vegas, United States
2007	(United States) Jenny Lynn	(United States) Gina Aliotti	(United States) Sonia Adcock	Las Vegas, United States
2008	(United States) Jennifer Gates	(United States) Gina Aliotti	(Lithuania) Zivile Raudoniene	Las Vegas, United States
2009	(United States) Nicole Wilkins	(United States) Gina Aliotti	(United States) Heather Mae	Las Vegas, United States
2010	(United States) Erin Stern	(United States) Nicole Wilkins	(United States) Heather Mae	Las Vegas, United States
2011	(United States) Nicole Wilkins	(United States) Erin Stern	(United States) Ava Cowan	Las Vegas, United States
2012	(United States) Erin Stern	(United States) Nicole Wilkins	(United States) Candice Keene	Las Vegas, United States
2013	(United States) Nicole Wilkins	(United States) Erin Stern	(United States) Candice Keene	Las Vegas, United States
2014	(United States) Nicole Wilkins	(United States) Candice Keene	(United States) Candice Lewis	Las Vegas, United States
2015	(United States) Latorya Watts	(United States) Nicole Wilkins	(United States) Candice Lewis	Las Vegas, United States
2016	(United States) Latorya Watts	(United States) Candice Lewis	(United States) Cydney Gillon	Las Vegas, United States
2017	(United States) Cydney Gillon	(United States) Latorya Watts	(United States) Candice Lewis	Las Vegas, United States
2018	(United States) Cydney Gillon	(United States) Candice Lewis	(United States) Nadia Wyatt	Las Vegas, United States
2019	(United States) Cydney Gillon	(United States) Latorya Watts	(United States) Nadia Wyatt	Las Vegas, United States
2020	(United States) Cydney Gillon	(Mexico) Natalia Soltero	(United States) Nadia Wyatt	Orlando, United States
2021	(United States) Cydney Gillon	(Mexico) Natalia Soltero	(United States) Stephanie Gibson	Orlando, United States
2022	(United States) Cydney Gillon	(Puerto Rico) Jessica Reyes Padilla	(Canada) Lola Montez	Las Vegas, United States
2023	(United States) Cydney Gillon	(Puerto Rico) Jessica Reyes Padilla	(Canada) Lola Montez	Orlando, United States
2024	(United States) Cydney Gillon	(Puerto Rico) Jessica Reyes Padilla	(Canada) Lola Montez	Las Vegas, United States
2025	(United Kingdom) Rhea Gayle	(Canada) Lola Montez	(Puerto Rico) Jessica Reyes Padilla	Las Vegas, United States

== Bikini Olympia ==
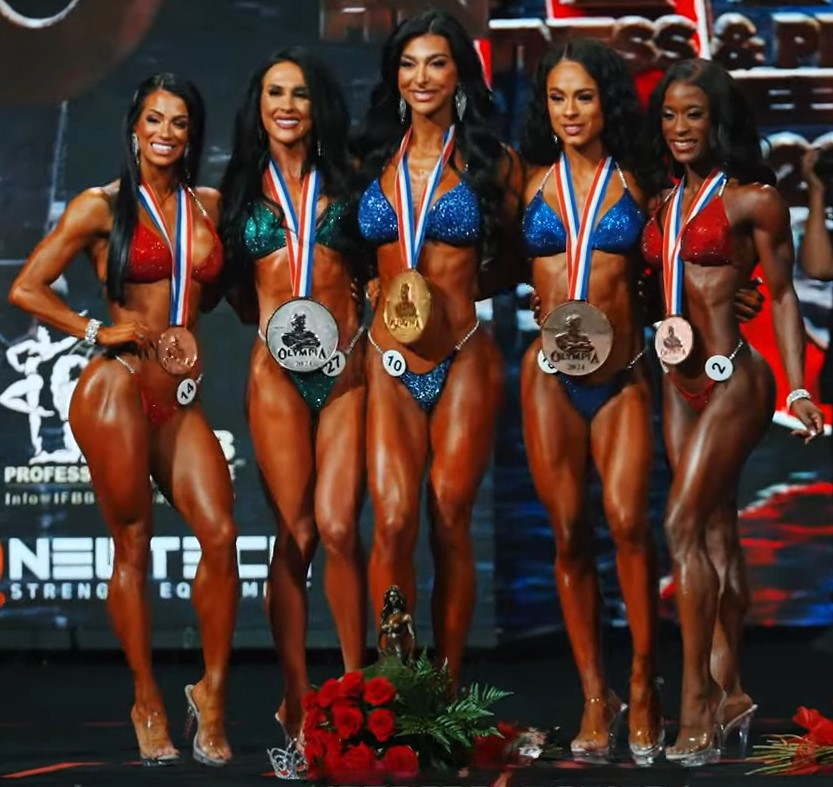
Bikini Olympia 2024 medalists (l to r): fourth place Aimee Leann Delgado, second place Ashley Kaltwasser, winner Lauralie Chapados, third place Jasmine Gonzalez, fifth place Vania Auguste

=== Winners ===
#	Year	Winner	Venue
1	2010	(United States) Sonia Gonzales	Las Vegas, United States
2	2011	(United States) Nicole Nagrani	Las Vegas, United States
3	2012	(Brazil) Nathalia Melo	Las Vegas, United States
4	2013	(United States) Ashley Kaltwasser	Las Vegas, United States
5	2014	(United States) Ashley Kaltwasser	Las Vegas, United States
6	2015	(United States) Ashley Kaltwasser	Las Vegas, United States
7	2016	(United States) Courtney King	Las Vegas, United States
8	2017	(United States) Angelica Teixeira	Las Vegas, United States
9	2018	(United States) Angelica Teixeira	Las Vegas, United States
10	2019	(Brazil) Elisa Pecini	Las Vegas, United States
11	2020	(United States) Janet Layug	Orlando, United States
12	2021	(Canada) Jennifer Dorie	Orlando, United States
13	2022	(Norway) Maureen Blanquisco	Las Vegas, United States
14	2023	(Canada) Jennifer Dorie	Orlando, United States
15	2024	(Canada) Lauralie Chapados	Las Vegas, United States
16	2025	(Philippines) Maureen Blanquisco	Las Vegas, United States

=== Top 3 ===
Year	Winner	Second place	Third place	Venue
2010	(United States) Sonia Gonzales	(Brazil) Nathalia Melo	(United States) Nicole Nagrani	Las Vegas, United States
2011	(United States) Nicole Nagrani	(Brazil) Nathalia Melo	(United States) Dianna Dahlgren	Las Vegas, United States
2012	(Brazil) Nathalia Melo	(United States) Nicole Nagrani	(United States) India Paulino	Las Vegas, United States
2013	(United States) Ashley Kaltwasser	(United States) Yeshaira Robles	(United States) Stacey Alexander	Las Vegas, United States
2014	(United States) Ashley Kaltwasser	(United States) Janet Layug	(United States) Stacey Alexander	Las Vegas, United States
2015	(United States) Ashley Kaltwasser	(United States) Janet Layug	(United States) Courtney King	Las Vegas, United States
2016	(United States) Courtney King	(United States) Angelica Teixeira	(United States) India Paulino	Las Vegas, United States
2017	(United States) Angelica Teixeira	(United States) Jennifer Ronzitti	(Argentina) Romina Basualdo	Las Vegas, United States
2018	(United States) Angelica Teixeira	(Canada) Lauralie Chapados	(United States) Janet Layug	Las Vegas, United States
2019	(Brazil) Elisa Pecini	(United States) Janet Layug	(United States) Angelica Teixeira	Las Vegas, United States
2020	(United States) Janet Layug	(Canada) Jennifer Dorie	(Brazil) Etila Santiago Santos	Orlando, United States
2021	(Canada) Jennifer Dorie	(Canada) Lauralie Chapados	(United States) Ashley Kaltwasser	Orlando, United States
2022	(Norway) Maureen Blanquisco	(Canada) Jennifer Dorie	(United States) Ashley Kaltwasser	Las Vegas, United States
2023	(Canada) Jennifer Dorie	(Philippines) Maureen Blanquisco	(United States) Ashley Kaltwasser	Orlando, United States
2024	(Canada) Lauralie Chapados	(United States) Ashley Kaltwasser	(United States) Jasmine Gonzalez	Las Vegas, United States
2025	(Philippines) Maureen Blanquisco	(United States) Ashlyn Little	(United States) Jasmine Gonzalez	Las Vegas, United States

== Women's Physique Olympia ==
=== Winners ===
#	Year	Winner	Venue
1	2013	(United States) Dana Linn Bailey	Las Vegas, United States
2	2014	(Brazil) Juliana Malacarne	Las Vegas, United States
3	2015	(Brazil) Juliana Malacarne	Las Vegas, United States
4	2016	(Brazil) Juliana Malacarne	Las Vegas, United States
5	2017	(Brazil) Juliana Malacarne	Las Vegas, United States
6	2018	(United States) Shanique Grant	Las Vegas, United States
7	2019	(United States) Shanique Grant	Las Vegas, United States
8	2020	(United States) Sarah Villegas	Orlando, United States
9	2021	(United States) Sarah Villegas	Orlando, United States
10	2022	(United States) Natalia Abraham Coelho	Las Vegas, United States
11	2023	(United States) Sarah Villegas	Orlando, United States
12	2024	(United States) Sarah Villegas	Las Vegas, United States
13	2025	(United States) Natalia Abraham Coelho	Las Vegas, United States

=== Top 3 ===
Year	Winner	Second place	Third place	Venue
2013	(United States) Dana Linn Bailey	(United States) Tycie Coppett	(United States) Sara Hurrle	Las Vegas, United States
2014	(Brazil) Juliana Malacarne	(United States) Dana Linn Bailey	(United States) Tycie Coppett	Las Vegas, United States
2015	(Brazil) Juliana Malacarne	(United States) Kira Neuman	(United States) Tycie Coppett	Las Vegas, United States
2016	(Brazil) Juliana Malacarne	(United States) Danielle Reardon	(United States) Heather Grace	Las Vegas, United States
2017	(Brazil) Juliana Malacarne	(United States) Jennifer Taylor	(United States) Heather Grace	Las Vegas, United States
2018	(United States) Shanique Grant	(United States) Natalia Abraham Coelho	(United States) Jennifer Taylor	Las Vegas, United States
2019	(United States) Shanique Grant	(United States) Sarah Villegas	(United States) Natalia Abraham Coelho	Las Vegas, United States
2020	(United States) Sarah Villegas	(United States) Shanique Grant	(United States) Natalia Abraham Coelho	Orlando, United States
2021	(United States) Sarah Villegas	(United States) Natalia Abraham Coelho	(United States) Brooke Walker	Orlando, United States
2022	(United States) Natalia Abraham Coelho	(United States) Sarah Villegas	(United States) Brooke Walker	Las Vegas, United States
2023	(United States) Sarah Villegas	(United States) Natalia Abraham Coelho	(Brazil) Zama Benta	Orlando, United States
2024	(United States) Sarah Villegas	(United States) Natalia Abraham Coelho	(United States) Sheronica Henton	Las Vegas, United States
2025	(United States) Natalia Abraham Coelho	(United States) Sarah Villegas	(Brazil) Zama Benta	Las Vegas, United States

== Wellness Olympia ==
=== Winners ===
#	Year	Winner	Venue
1	2021	(Brazil) Francielle Mattos	Orlando, United States
2	2022	(Brazil) Francielle Mattos	Las Vegas, United States
3	2023	(Brazil) Francielle Mattos	Orlando, United States
4	2024	(Brazil) Isabelle Nunes	Las Vegas, United States
5	2025	(Brazil) Eduarda Bezerra	Las Vegas, United States

=== Top 3 ===
Year	Winner	Second place	Third place	Venue
2021	(Brazil) Francielle Mattos	(Brazil) Angela Borges	(Brazil) Isabelle Nunes	Orlando, United States
2022	(Brazil) Francielle Mattos	(Brazil) Isabelle Nunes	(Brazil) Angela Borges	Las Vegas, United States
2023	(Brazil) Francielle Mattos	(Brazil) Isabelle Nunes	(Dominican Republic) Elisa Alcántara	Orlando, United States
2024	(Brazil) Isabelle Nunes	(Brazil) Francielle Mattos	(Brazil) Eduarda Bezerra	Las Vegas, United States
2025	(Brazil) Eduarda Bezerra	(Brazil) Isabelle Nunes	(Dominican Republic) Elisa Alcántara	Las Vegas, United States

== See also ==
- Rising Phoenix World Championships (the equivalent contest to the Ms. Olympia from 2015 – 2019)
- Mr. Olympia (the male equivalent)
