= 1981 Ms. Olympia =

Women's professional bodybuilding competition

- Promotion: IFBB
- Date: August 22, 1981
- Venue: Sheraton Hotel
- City: Philadelphia, Pennsylvania, United States

Event chronology
1980 Ms. Olympia	1981 Ms. Olympia	1982 Ms. Olympia

The 1981 Ms. Olympia contest was an IFBB professional bodybuilding competition was held on August 22, 1981, at the Sheraton Hotel in Philadelphia, Pennsylvania. It was the 2nd Ms. Olympia competition held.

== Prize money ==
Total: $25,000

== Rounds ==
- Round 1 (Symmetry Round): Judging the balance and proportion of contestants' physiques.
- Round 2 (Muscularity Round): Focused on muscle size and definition.
- Round 3 (Compulsory Poses Round): Contestants performed mandatory poses to highlight their muscle groups.
- Round 4 (Posing Routine Round): A choreographed routine where contestants displayed their physiques with music.

== Results ==
Place	Prize	Name
1	$25,000	(Finland) Kike Elomaa
2		(United States) Rachel McLish
3		(United States) Lynn Conkwright
4		(United States) Laura Combes
5		(United States) Georgia Fudge
6		(United States) Candy Csencsits
7		(United States) Corinne Machado-Ching
8		(Guadeloupe) Marie Frances Misat
9		(United States) Anita Gandol
10		(United States) Melinda Perper
11		(United States) Kyle Newman
12		(United States) Karen Wainwright
13		(United States) Ellen Davis
14		(United States) April Nicotra
15		(Switzerland) Astrid Aschwender
16		(West Germany) Vera Bendel
17		(United States) Donna Frame
18		(United Kingdom) Carolyn Cheshire
19		(United States) Debbie Lemmel
20		(United States) Lorie Johnston

== Attended ==
- 2nd Ms. Olympia attended - Carolyn Cheshire, Georgia Fudge, Lorie Johnston, Corinne Machado-Ching, Rachel McLish, Kyle Newman, and April Nicotra
- 1st Ms. Olympia attended - Astrid Aschwender, Vera Bendel, Laura Combes, Lynn Conkwright, Candy Csencsits, Ellen Davis, Kike Elomaa, Donna Frame, Anita Gandol, Lorie Johnston, Debbie Lemmel, Marie Frances Misat, Melinda Perper, Karen Wainwright
- Previous year Olympia attendees who did not attend - Stacey Bentley, Lenore Clark, Patsy Chapman, Sandy Conners, Kellie Everts, Anniqa Fors, Suzy Green, Lynda Johnson, Cammie Lusko, Auby Paulick, Mimi Rivest, and Donna Simms

== See also ==
- 1981 Mr. Olympia
