= 1983 Ms. Olympia =

Bodybuilding competition

- Promotion: IFBB
- Date: October 22, 1983
- City: Warminster, Pennsylvania, United States

Event chronology
1982 Ms. Olympia	1983 Ms. Olympia	1984 Ms. Olympia

The 1983 Ms. Olympia contest was an IFBB professional bodybuilding competition was held on October 22, 1983, in Warminster, Pennsylvania. It was the 4th Ms. Olympia competition held.

== Rounds ==
- Round 1 (Symmetry Round): Judging the balance and proportion of contestants' physiques.
- Round 2 (Muscularity Round): Focused on muscle size and definition.
- Round 3 (Compulsory Poses Round): Contestants performed specific mandatory poses to highlight their muscle groups.
- Round 4 (Posing Routine Round): A choreographed routine to music, allowing contestants to showcase their physiques creatively and emphasize presentation skills.

== Results ==
Place	Prize	Name
1		(United States) Carla Dunlap
2		(United States) Candy Csencsits
3		(Sweden) Inger Zetterqvist
4		(United States) Lynn Conkwright
5		(Finland) Kike Elomaa
6		(Denmark) Lisser Frost-Larsen
7		(United Kingdom) Carolyn Cheshire
8		(United States) Deborah Diana
9		(Finland) Marjo Selin
10		(United States) Kay Baxter
11		(United States) Anita Gandol
12		(Canada) Sherry Atton
13		(United States) Georgia Fudge
14		(United States) Melinda Perper
15		(United States) Corinne Machado-Ching
16		(United States) Kathy Ruth
17		(United States) Patsy Chapman

== See also ==
- 1983 Mr. Olympia
