= 1982 Ms. Olympia =

Women's professional bodybuilding competition

- Promotion: IFBB
- Date: 1982
- City: Atlantic City, New Jersey, United States

Event chronology
1981 Ms. Olympia	1982 Ms. Olympia	1983 Ms. Olympia

The 1982 Ms. Olympia contest was an IFBB professional bodybuilding competition was held in 1982 in Atlantic City, New Jersey. It was the 3rd Ms. Olympia competition held. Following the 1982 event, contestants were no longer hand-picked by promoters, but instead had to qualify for the Ms. Olympia through specific placements in lesser competitions.

== Rounds ==
- Round 1 (Symmetry Round): Judging the balance and proportion of contestants' physiques.
- Round 2 (Muscularity Round): Focused on muscle size and definition.
- Round 3 (Posing Routine Round): Contestants performed a choreographed routine to music, showcasing their presentation skills.

== Results ==
Place	Prize	Name
1		(United States) Rachel McLish
2		(United States) Carla Dunlap
3		(Finland) Kike Elomaa
4		(United States) Lynn Conkwright
5		(United States) Deborah Diana
6		(United States) Laura Combes
7		(United States) Candy Csencsits
8		(United States) Kay Baxter
9		(Canada) Sherry Atton
10		(Denmark) Lisser Frost-Larsen
11		(United States) Georgia Fudge
12		(United States) Shelley Gruwell
13		(United States) Corinne Machado-Ching
14		(United Kingdom) Carolyn Cheshire
15		(Guadeloupe) Marie Frances Misat
16		(Netherlands) Jacqueline Roos
17		(United States) Claudia Wilbourn
18		(Finland) Marjo Selin
19		(United States) Anita Gandol
19		(Canada) Laura Davies
19		(United States) Susan Koch
19		(Japan) Kazuko Nakao
19		(United States) Kyle Newman
19		(Sweden) Lena Trulsson
19		(United States) Cathy Chang
19		(United States) Patsy Chapman

== See also ==
- 1982 Mr. Olympia
