= 1980 Ms. Olympia =

Women's professional bodybuilding competition

- Promotion: IFBB Pro Division
- Date: 30 August 1980
- Venue: Sheraton Hotel
- City: Philadelphia, Pennsylvania, United States of America

Event chronology
None	1980 Ms. Olympia	1981 Ms. Olympia

The 1980 Ms. Olympia contest was an International Federation of Bodybuilders Professional Division (IFBB Pro Division) professional female bodybuilding contest. It was the first Ms. Olympia contest held.

== Prize money ==
- 1st - $5,000

Total: $10,000

== Rounds ==
- Round 1 (Symmetry Round): Judging the overall balance and proportion of contestants' physiques.
- Round 2 (Muscularity Round): Focused on muscle size and definition.
- Round 3 (Compulsory Poses Round): Contestants performed mandatory poses to highlight their muscle groups.
- Round 4 (Posing Routine Round): A choreographed posing routine where contestants showcased their physique and presentation skills.

== Results ==
Place	Prize	Name
1	$5,000	(United States) Rachel McLish
2		(United States) Auby Paulick
3		(United States) Lynn Conkwright
4		(United States) Corinne Machado-Ching
5		(United States) Stacey Bentley
6		(United States) Sue Green
7		(United States) Patsy Chapman
8		(United States) Kyle Newman
9		(United States) Cammie Lusko
10		(United States) Georgia Fudge
11		(Canada) Mimi Rivest
12		(United States) April Nicotra
13		(United Kingdom) Carolyn Cheshire
14		(United States) Sandy Connors
15		(United States) Lorie Johnston
16		(Denmark) Anniqua Fors
17		(United States) Lenore Clark
18		(United States) Donna Simms
19		(United States) Lynde Johnson
20		(United States) Kellie Everts

== Notable events ==
- Rachel McLish won her first Ms. Olympia.
- Ms. Olympia was originally known as Miss Olympia.
- Lorie Johnston was the youngest person to ever compete as a Ms. Olympia competition, at the age of 17 years.

== See also ==
- 1980 Mr. Olympia
