= 1990 Ms. Olympia =

Bodybuilding competition

- Promotion: IFBB
- Date: November 24, 1990
- Venue: Beacon Theatre
- City: New York City, New York, United States

Event chronology
1989 Ms. Olympia	1990 Ms. Olympia	1991 Ms. Olympia

The 1990 Ms. Olympia contest was an IFBB professional bodybuilding competition that was held on November 24, 1990, in New York City, New York. It was the 11th Ms. Olympia competition held.

== Prize money ==
- 2nd - $15,000
- 3rd - $10,000
- 4th - $5,000
- 5th - $4,000
- 6th - $3,000

== Rounds ==
- Round 1 (Symmetry Round): Judging the overall balance and proportion of the contestants' physiques.
- Round 2 (Muscularity Round): Focused on muscle size and definition.
- Round 3 (Compulsory Poses Round): Contestants performed mandatory poses to showcase key muscle groups.
- Round 4 (Posing Routine Round): A choreographed posing routine to music, where contestants highlighted their physique and presentation skills creatively.

== Results ==
Place	Prize	Name
1	$50,000	(United States) Lenda Murray
2	$20,000	(Australia) Bev Francis
3	$10,000	(Germany) Anja Schreiner
4		(United States) Laura Creavalle
5		(United States) Jackie Paisley
6		(United States) Sharon Arrildt
7		(United States) Diana Dennis
8		(France) Marie Mahabir
9		(Italy) Claudia Profanter
10		(Netherlands) Hannie Van Aken
11		(United States) Lisa Lorio
12		(Germany) Susanne Steurer
13		(United States) Kathy Unger
14		(United States) Janet Tech
15		(United States) Gillian Hodge
16		(United States) Dorothy Herndon
16		(United States) Dona Oliveira
17		(Canada) Sandra Blackie
17		(France) Gloria Bouvier
17		(United States) Carolyn Ervin
17		(United States) Janice Graser
17		(Canada) Negrita Jayde
17		(Canada) Lynn Lemieux
17		(United States) Debbie McKnight
17		(United States) Penny Price
17		(United States) Ana Sanchez
17		(Germany) Tatjana Scholl
17		(Germany) Eleonore Urbanski
17		(United States) Mary Ellen Warman

=== Scorecard ===
Contestant Country (In order of appearance)	Round 1	Round 2	Round 3	Pose Down	Final Place
Dianna Dennis, USA	41	38	35	114	7
Susanne Steurer, Germany	63	69	67	199	12
Kathy Unger, USA	71	70	64	205	13
Bev Francis, Australia/USA	13	15	19	62	2
Jackie Paisley, USA	35	34	32	127	5
Hanny Van Aken, Holland	58	53	55	166	10
Janet Tech, USA	71	79	75	225	14
Claudia Profanter, Italy	51	50	52	153	9
Anja Schreiner, Germany	14	23	14	66	3
Donna Oliveira, USA	79	80	80	239	16
Lisa Lorior, USA	60	64	55	179	11
Lenda Murray, USA	6	6	5	22	1
Marie Laure Mahabir, France	42	46	45	133	8
Sharon Arrildt, USA	39	36	38	142	6
Gillian Hodge, Trinidad & Tobago	80	71	80	231	15
Dorothy Herndon, USA	79	80	80	239	17
Laura Creavalle, Guyana	27	16	18	76	4

== Notable events ==
- This Ms. Olympia competition had 30 competitors attending, the most competitors attending a Ms. Olympia ever.
- This was the last Ms. Olympia contest to drug test.

== See also ==
- 1990 Mr. Olympia
