= Dana Bailey =

Dana Bailey may refer to:

- Dana Reed Bailey (1833–1908), politician in Vermont, Wisconsin and South Dakota
- Dana Linn Bailey (born 1986), American fitness and figure competitor
