= Jackie Paisley =

American bodybuilder (1963- 2017)

- Professional bodybuilder

Personal info
- Born: 1963; Altoona, Pennsylvania, U.S.
- Died: March 17, 2017 (aged 53–54); Scottsdale, Arizona, U.S.

Best statistics

Professional (Pro) career
- Pro-debut: IFBB 1988 Ms. International; 1988
- Best win: IFBB Ms. International champion; 1989
- Predecessor: Cathey Palyo
- Successor: Laura Creavalle
- Active: Retired from Bodybuilding Competition in 1991

Jackie Paisley was a professional female bodybuilder from Scottsdale, Arizona in the United States.

== Legacy ==
As a college student who attended both Carnegie Mellon University and Arizona State University on a music scholarship, Paisley was drawn into the world of bodybuilding after she achieved a reputation as one of Arizona's top aerobics instructors. She attended her first state-wide bodybuilding show in 1982 and began to compete immediately after that. In 1989, she was challenging Cory Everson for the world championship on the Olympia stage.

After winning almost every bodybuilding show she ever entered, Paisley was known for being lean, musclebound and in good condition for every show. Her background in ballet and her dynamic presence on stage propelled her to the elite level of the bodybuilding world for nearly a decade. After receiving her master's degree in Nutrition, she spent many years after retirement from competition as a professional nutritionist at the Beauvais Fitness Centers and other various gyms in the Phoenix metropolitan area.

Paisley had a son, born in 2005. After the birth, she became a Christian and an avid Bible scholar, attending Scottsdale Bible Church and composing books about health, fitness, medicine and her newfound relationship with God. She began to have health problems in 2015 and these became a serious illness in 2016. On March 17, 2017, Paisley died. She was survived by her 12-year-old son and her brother.

== Bodybuilding career ==
=== Amateur ===
Paisley won every state and local bodybuilding show in Arizona before proceeding to the professional ranks.

=== Professional ===
After IFBB officials presented strong evidence against Tonya Knight that she got someone other than herself her to supply test-passing urine, she admitted that she sent a surrogate to take a mandatory drug test administered before the 1988 Ms. Olympia, where she finished fourth. In a ruling handed down in November 1989, Knight was suspended and stripped of her 1989 Ms. International title and prize money. Paisley, who had been the runner-up, was thus awarded the title.

=== Titles ===
Paisley was awarded the titles of 1983 Miss Phoenix Bodybuilding Champion, 1984 Miss Arizona Bodybuilding Champion, 1986 NPC National Champion (heavyweight division), 1987 Miss USA Bodybuilding Champion (heavyweight and overall), 1989 Miss International Bodybuilding Champion (heavyweight division), and 4th place in the 1989 Miss Olympia Bodybuilding World Championships, 6th place in the 1990 Miss Olympia Bodybuilding World Championships, and 11th place in the 1991 Miss Olympia Bodybuilding World Championship.

=== Contest history ===
- 1985 NPC Nationals - 10th (LHW)
- 1986 NPC Nationals - 6th (HW)
- 1987 NPC USA Championship - 1st (HW & overall)
- 1988 Ms. International - 3rd
- 1988 Pro World Championship - 8th
- 1989 Ms. International - 1st
- 1989 Pro World Championship - 2nd
- 1989 IFBB Ms. Olympia - 4th
- 1990 Ms. International - 2nd
- 1990 IFBB Ms. Olympia - 5th
- 1991 IFBB Ms. Olympia - 11th

Ms. International
Preceded by: Cathey Palyo	First (1989)	Succeeded by: Laura Creavalle
