= Juliana Malacarne =

Brazilian IFBB professional bodybuilder (born 1974)

Juliana Cristina Malacarne
- professional bodybuilder

Personal info
- Born: May 8, 1974 (age 51); Americana, São Paulo, Brazil

Best statistics
- Height: 5 ft 2 in (1.57 m)
- Weight: 124 lb (contest)

Professional (Pro) career
- Pro-debut: IFBB Europa Super Show; 2006
- Best win: Olympia Women's Physique Showdown; 2014
- Predecessor: Dana Linn Bailey
- Successor: Shanique Grant

Juliana Cristina Malacarne (born May 8, 1974) is a Brazilian IFBB professional bodybuilder. She is a four-time winner of the Olympia Women's Physique Showdown, having won every year from 2014 to 2017.

== Early life ==
Malacarne was born in Americana, São Paulo. She is of Brazilian and Italian descent.

== Career ==
Malacarne started training after inspiration from Monica Brant and participated in the 2005 IFBB Amateur BodyFitness Championships in São Paulo, where she earned her IFBB Pro Card. She moved to the United States in 2007 and competed at various fitness and physique competitions. She won the New York Pro Championship Women's Physique category in 2012, 2013, and 2014. She participated in the 2014 Olympia Women's Physique Showdown, defeating defending champion Dana Linn Bailey by a small margin, and went on to win the contest again in 2015, 2016, and 2017.
