= Ashley Kaltwasser =

American bodybuilder (born 1988)

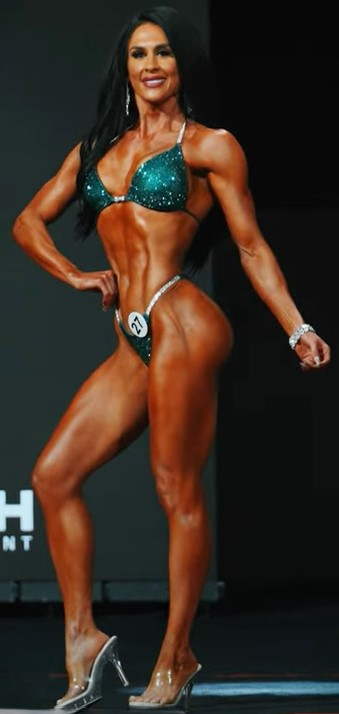
Kaltwasser poses in the Bikini Olympia 2024

Ashley Kaltwasser (born November 22, 1988) is an American IFBB Pro League bikini competitor who has won three Bikini Olympia titles, two Arnold International Bikini titles, and holds the record for the most IFBB wins of any pro competitor with 60 victories.

== Early life ==
Ashley Kaltwasser was born in Akron, Ohio. She started gymnastics at age four and attended Coventry High School in Ohio where she transitioned to track and field, competing in hurdles and cross-country, breaking multiple school records and achieving All-Ohio status. She earned a division 1 scholarship to University of Akron for track, where she attended for three years, and focused on the 400-meter hurdles and also competed in the pentathlon. Eventually, encouraged by her former high school coach Faith Phillabaum, a former IFBB pro, Kaltwasser began competing in physique competitions.

== Career ==
Kaltwasser made her bodybuilding debut in 2011 coached by Summer Montabone of Team VIP (Very Impressive Physique). That year she competed at both the Arnold Amateur, placing fourteenth in Class C, and the NPC Natural Northern USA Championships, placing first. The following year, she won the overall bikini title at the Arnold Amateur and went on to win another overall title and receive her pro card at the NPC Team Universe competition the same year. She made her pro debut at the 2012 Houston Pro, placing fifth.

Kaltwasser won the Bikini Olympia began 2013, and received consecutive wins in 2014 and 2015. This feat makes her one of only four competitors to win the Olympia title in their debut Olympia appearance and the only bikini competitor to achieve this victory more than twice. She is now coached by Adam Bonilla at Team Elite Physique.

== Olympia & Arnold placings ==
	2013	2014	2015	2016	2017	2018	2019	2020	2021	2022	2023	2024	2025
Bikini Olympia	1st	1st	1st	4th	-	5th	6th	7th	3rd	3rd	3rd	2nd	5th
Bikini Arnold	10th	1st	1st	-	-	-	3rd	-	4th	3rd	4th	-	-

== Other notable pro placings ==
=== 2012 ===
- Houston Pro — 5th place

=== 2013 ===
- Bikini International — 10th place
- Europa Show of Champions — 2nd place
- Pittsburgh Pro — 2nd place
- Powerhouse Classic — 1st place
- New York Pro — 2nd place
- Toronto Pro — 1st place
- Bikini Olympia — 1st place
- Sheru Classic — 1st place

=== 2014 ===
- Bikini International — 1st place
- Australian Grand Prix — 1st place
- New Zealand Pro — 1st place
- New York Pro — 2nd place
- Toronto Pro — 1st place
- Bikini Olympia — 1st place
- Korea Grand Prix — 1st place
- Russia Pro — 1st place

=== 2015 ===
- Bikini International — 1st place
- Bikini Olympia — 1st place
- Nordic Pro — 1st place

=== 2016 ===
- Bikini Olympia — 4th place

=== 2018 ===
- Mile High Pro — 1st place
- Vancouver Pro — 1st place
- Battle of the Desert — 1st place
- Bikini Olympia — 5th place

=== 2019 ===
- Bikini International — 3rd place
- Battle at the Falls — 3rd place
- Mile High Pro — 1st place
- Northern California Pro — 1st place
- Bikini Olympia — 6th place
- Powerhouse Classic — 3rd place

=== 2020 ===
- World Klash Pro — 1st place
- Pacific USA Pro — 1st place
- Tahoe Show — 2nd place
- Battle in the Desert — 1st place
- Bikini Olympia — 7th place

=== 2021 ===
- World Klash Pro — 3rd place
- Wasatch Warrior Pro — 1st place
- Pittsburgh Pro — 1st place
- California Night of Champions — 1st place
- New York Pro — 2nd place
- Mile High Pro —1st place
- Clash of the Titanz — 1st place
- Patriots Challenge Pro — 1st place
- Texas Pro — 1st place
- Tahoe Show — 2nd place
- Bikini International — 4th place
- Bikini Olympia — 3rd place
- Romania Muscle Fest Pro — 1st place
- Bigman Weekend Pro — 2nd place

=== 2022 ===
- Legends Pro — 1st place
- Bikini International — 3rd place
- Golden State Pro — 1st place
- Wasatch Warrior Pro — 1st place
- Pittsburgh Pro — 2nd place
- Toronto Pro — 1st place
- Mile High Pro — 2nd place
- Patriots Challenge Pro — 2nd place
- Sasquatch Pro — 1st place
- Arnold Classic UK — 1st place
- Nevada State Pro — 1st place
- Bikini Olympia — 3rd place

=== 2023 ===
- Bikini International — 4th place
- Pittsburgh Pro — 2nd place
- Nevada State Pro — 1st place
- Mile High Pro — 1st place
- Patriots Challenge Pro — 1st place
- Vancouver Pro — 1st place

=== 2024 ===
- Klash Series Grl Pwr Championships Pro— 1st place
- Nevada State Championships Pro — 1st place
- Patriots Challenge Pro— 2nd place
- Optimum Classic Pro — 1st place
- Invictus Pro— 1st place
- Tokyo Pro — 1st place
