= Erin Stern =

American bodybuilder

- ♀ Professional bodybuilder
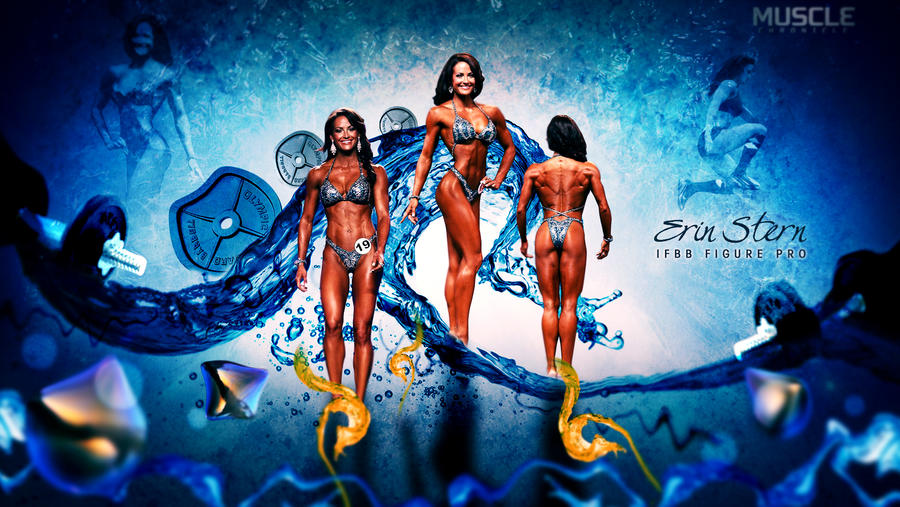

Personal info
- Nickname: Iron Erin, Erin Fast
- Born: February 5, 1980 (age 46); Tampa, Florida United States

Best statistics
- Height: 176 cm (5 ft 9 in)
- Weight: 138lb (132lb contest)

Professional (Pro) career
- Pro-debut: Arnold Classic; 2009
- Best win: Figure Olympia; 2010, 2012
- Predecessor: Nicole Wilkins-Lee
- Successor: Nicole Wilkins
- Active: Since 2009

Erin Stern (born February 5, 1980) is an American IFBB fitness professional and two-time Figure Olympia champion. She is a self-proclaimed lifetime natural athlete and now competes in the IFBB bikini division.

== Early life ==
Erin Elyse Stern was born to a religious Reform Jewish family and attended a religious school. Her parents were both athletic; father formerly played football for C.W. Post and Adelphi University, and her mother ran three miles a day. She started horse riding in competitions at a young age, and later developed a passion for running, just like her mother, which led her to her track career.

== Education & track career ==
Encouraged by her father, Stern earned a collegiate division I track and field scholarship to the University of Florida where she attended from 1999 to 2002. She competed in the high jump and earned Junior All-American status. She hit her high mark of 5-8.75 as a freshman, but later broke her foot and didn't hit a personal best again until six years later, competing in amateur competitions, clearing 5-11, which would have been good enough to win the SEC championship in three of her four years at school.

She graduated with a BA in Environmental Policy.

In 2008, Stern missed the chance to try for the US Olympic team as a high jumper by just 3 centimeters.

== Bodybuilding career ==
Stern started bodybuilding in 2008 after feeling like she had reached her potential in the high jump. That same year, she won every amateur competition she entered, including winning the overall title at NPC Nationals in Atlanta and earning her pro card.

In March 2009, she made her pro debut at the Arnold Classic. She placed tenth at that competition but moved up to second place at the Arnold the following year. She made her Olympia debut in 2009, placing sixth and getting named Rookie of the Year. She then went on to win her first Figure Olympia title in 2010 and won again in 2012.

Stern had always competed in the figure division until she transitioned to the bikini division in 2020, where she continues to compete today.

Stern is the author of three books: MPower Your Life (April 2015), The Bodybuilder’s Kitchen (Alpha, April 2018) and Train Like a Bodybuilder (Alpha, July 2019).

== Competitive history ==
=== Till 2011 ===
- 2008 NPC National Bodybuilding and Figure Championships — 1st Place
- 2009 IFBB Arnold Classic — 10th Place
- 2009 IFBB Europa Show of Champions — 5th Place
- 2009 IFBB Jacksonville Pro — 2nd Place
- 2009 IFBB Houston Pro Figure — 2nd Place
- 2009 IFBB Figure Olympia — 6th Place
- 2009 IFBB Fort Lauderdale Pro Fitness and Figure — 2nd Place
- 2010 IFBB Arnold Classic — 2nd Place
- 2010 IFBB Europa Show of Champions — 1st Place
- 2010 IFBB Figure Olympia — 1st Place
- 2011 IFBB Arnold Classic — 2nd Place
- 2011 IFBB Australian Pro Grand Prix XI — 1st Place
- 2011 IFBB New Zealand Pro Figure — 1st Place
- 2011 IFBB Olympia - 2nd Place
- 2011 IFBB Jacksonville Pro- 1st Place

=== 2012 ===
- 2012 Figure International — 2nd Place
- 2012 Australian Pro Figure Classic — 1st Place
- 2012 Valenti Classic Pro Figure — 1st Place
- 2012 Figure Olympia — 1st Place
- 2012 Sheru Classic — 1st Place
- 2012 Arnold Classic Europe — 1st Place

=== 2013 ===
- 2013 Arnold Classic — 3rd Place
- 2013 Australia Pro — 2nd place
- 2013 Valenti Classic - 1st place
- 2013 Figure Olympia — 2nd Place

=== 2014 ===
- 2014 IFBB Australia Pro Grand Prix XIV - 6th Place

=== 2020 ===
- 2020 IFBB Hurricane Pro - 10th
- 2020 IFBB Ny Pro - 7th
- 2020 IFBB Klash World Championship - 10th
- 2020 IFBB Tampa Pro -10th

=== 2021 ===
- 2021 IFBB Atlantic Coast Pro - 4th
- 2021 IFBB Bikini Olympia - 15th
- 2021 IFBB Tahoe Show - 1st Place
- 2021 IFBB Janet Layug's Battle of the Bodies - 7th
- 2021 IFBB Republic of Texas - 2nd
- 2021 IFBB NY Pro - 12th
- 2021 IFBB GRL PWR - 13th

== See also ==
- List of female fitness & figure competitors
- Arnold Classic
