= Nicole Wilkins =

American figure competitor

- Professional bodybuilder
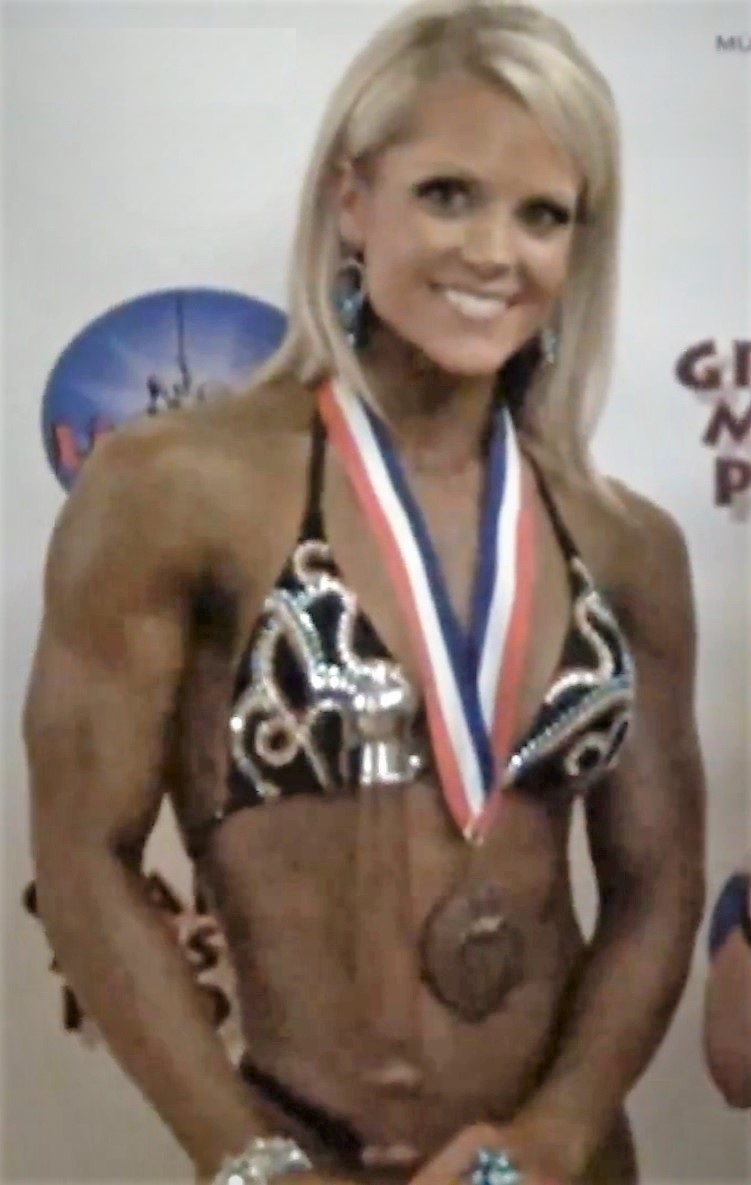
- Wilkins interviewed at GNC 2011

Personal info
- Born: February 5, 1984 (age 42); Farmington, MI

Best statistics
- Height: 5 ft 5.5 in (1.66 m)
- Weight: (In Season): 133 lb (Off Season): 145-148 lb

Professional (Pro) career
- Pro-debut: IFBB Figure International, 2008
- Best win: 4 times IFBB Figure Olympia Winner (2009, 2011, 2013-14); 2011
- Predecessor: Jennifer Gates

Nicole Wilkins (born February 5, 1984), is an American professional figure and fitness competitor, fitness model, and fitness trainer. She is a four-time winner of the IFBB Figure Olympia Competition, and a three-time victor of the IFBB Figure International.

== Early life ==
Wilkins earned a Bachelor of Arts degree from Oakland University, majoring in health, wellness, and injury prevention.

== Career ==
At the age of 19, Wilkins prepared for her first fitness competition at the 2003 NPC in Western Michigan where she placed 1st in the fitness competition.

The following year, as a junior in college, she competed in five more competitions, alternating between the Fitness and Figure divisions. Over the next three years she moved from the local/regional to the national level to get her pro card and gain entry into the IFBB Professional League.

In July 2007, Wilkins participated in the NPC Team Universe Championships held in New York City, where she competed in both the Fitness and Figure categories—a practice which was last allowed in the 2007 Team Universe event. She secured the Overall title in both categories, outperforming around 200 competitors from across the country, thereby earning her professional card. This marked the first occasion where a competitor clinched the Overall titles in both Fitness and Figure at the same national-level competition.

One year later she made her professional debut as an IFBB competitor at the 2008 Arnold Classic in Columbus.

In 2009, Wilkins became the youngest woman in the history of the sport to win the Figure Olympia contest. In 2010, she won 1st place in the Arnold Classic, but lost the Figure Olympia title to Erin Stern.

In 2011, she came back to win 5 titles and became the first person to reclaim Figure Olympia title, as well as the first person to win the Figure Olympia and the Figure International in the same year.

In 2012, she was runner up in the Figure Olympia to competitor Erin Stern, but she reclaimed the title again in 2013, and had her fourth Figure Olympia win in 2014.

Wilkins is a certified trainer by the IFPA.

== Competitions ==
- 2007 NPC Junior Nationals Bodybuilding, Fitness And Figure Contest – 2nd
- 4 times IFBB Figure Olympia Champion – 2009, 2011, 2013, 2014
