= Susie Curry =

American fitness competitor

Susan Flora Curry
- Professional bodybuilder

Personal info
- Nickname: Susie Curry eighth wonder of the fitness world The Human Tumbleweed
- Born: November 22, 1972 (age 53); Santa Barbara, California

Best statistics
- Height: 5 ft 2 in (1.57 m)
- Weight: (In Season) 110-113 lb (Off-Season) 118-120 lb

Professional (Pro) career
- Pro-debut: NPC North Carolina Women's Fitness Championships; 1996
- Best win: IFBB Fitness Olympia Four times; 2000-2003
- Predecessor: Mary Yockey
- Successor: Adela Garcia
- Active: 1996-2004

Susie Curry is a retired professional fitness competitor from the United States. She has won four Miss Fitness International titles, and four consecutive Miss Fitness Olympia titles.

== Biography ==
Susan Flora Curry was born on November 22, 1972, in Santa Barbara, California as the second oldest of three siblings. She was born to a mixed Irish-Indian-Italian father who met her Vietnamese mother while working as a U.S. Army warrant during the Vietnam war. By the time of her birth, her father was already working in the military in the United States, but due to his military work Curry and her family constantly traveling and living in places such as Germany, New York City, Korea, and North Carolina. When she and her family settled in Carolina, Susie developed a passion for gymnastics in high school. She excelled in this discipline so much that a gymnastics coach of the North Carolina State University at Raleigh took notice and offered her a scholarship to attend the university. She was unable to fulfill her potential at the collegiate level due to injuries, but was able to graduate with a degree in biological sciences.

Curry first began weight training in college, she was introduced to it by her coach in order to improve her performance. When she retired from competitive gymnastics, Curry became more serious about weight training when she noticed that her body was rapidly changing due to her lack of activity, saying:

When you stop doing gymnastics, your body changes quite rapidly. You don't realize how much all that training really develops your physique. When you stop, you need something else to keep it in shape.

She started competing in fitness contests in 1996, and turned professional in 1997. She is one of the most successful competitors in the history of women's fitness, with four titles at both the Fitness International and the Fitness Olympia, the two most prestigious shows in the world of competitive fitness. She is the most decorated fitness champion in the sport. In 2004, she switched to figure competition citing the overall demand on gymnastics and the stress this had on her joints, her last fitness competition was the GNC Show of Strength. She ended her competitive career by placing third in the Figure International.

Susie did not defend her Fitness Olympia title in 2004 because she and her husband Danny were expecting a child. Susie competes at 5'2" and 115 pounds, and currently lives in Bremen, Georgia where she co-owns a gyms and trains clients. Curry has a rose tattoo in her lower abdomen, in the October 1999 edition of Muscle and Fitness magazine, she explained that in college her roommate's mother died and both of them got identical rose tattoos, in remembrance of her. She hopes to one day be fluent in Vietnamese visit her family members in Vietnam along with her mother.

== Contest history ==
- 1996 NPC North Carolina Women's Fitness Championships - 1st
- 1996 NPC Junior USA Women Fitness - 1st
- 1996 NPC National Women's Fitness - 1st
- 1996 IFBB World Amateur Fitness - 1st
- 1997 IFBB Fitness Olympia - 4th
- 1997 IFBB Fitness International - 3rd
- 1997 IFBB World Pro Fitness Championship - 1st
- 1998 IFBB Fitness International - 1st
- 1998 IFBB Fitness Olympia - 2nd
- 1999 IFBB Fitness International - 1st
- 1999 IFBB Fitness Olympia - 3rd
- 2000 IFBB Pittsburgh Pro Fitness - 1st
- 2000 IFBB Fitness Olympia - 1st
- 2001 IFBB Fitness Olympia - 1st
- 2002 IFBB Fitness International - 1st
- 2002 IFBB Fitness Olympia - 1st
- 2003 IFBB Fitness International - 1st
- 2003 IFBB GNC Show of Strength - 1st
- 2003 IFBB Fitness Olympia - 1st
- 2004 IFBB Figure International - 3rd
