= Adela García =

Dominican fitness competitor (born 1971)

Adela Garcia
- Professional bodybuilder

Personal info
- Nickname: Chica, Chica Latina
- Born: December 1, 1971 (age 54); Cabrera, Dominican Republic

Best statistics
- Height: 5 ft 1 in (1.55 m)
- Weight: (In Season) 109-110 lb (Off-Season) 119-125 lb

Professional (Pro) career
- Pro-debut: NPC Europa Sports Fitness Championship; 1995
- Best win: Ms. Fitness Olympia eight times.; 2004, 2006, 2007, 2009, 2010, 2011, 2012, 2013
- Predecessor: Susie Curry (2003) and Jen Hendershott (2005)
- Successor: Oksana Grishina (2014)
- Active: since 1995

Adela Garcia (born December 1, 1971) is an IFBB professional fitness competitor and former Ms. IFBB Fitness Olympia.

== Biography ==
Adela was born on December 1, 1971, in Cabrera, Dominican Republic, and moved to San Juan, Puerto Rico, at age eight. In school, she played softball, volleyball, and basketball. She started weight training at age 17.

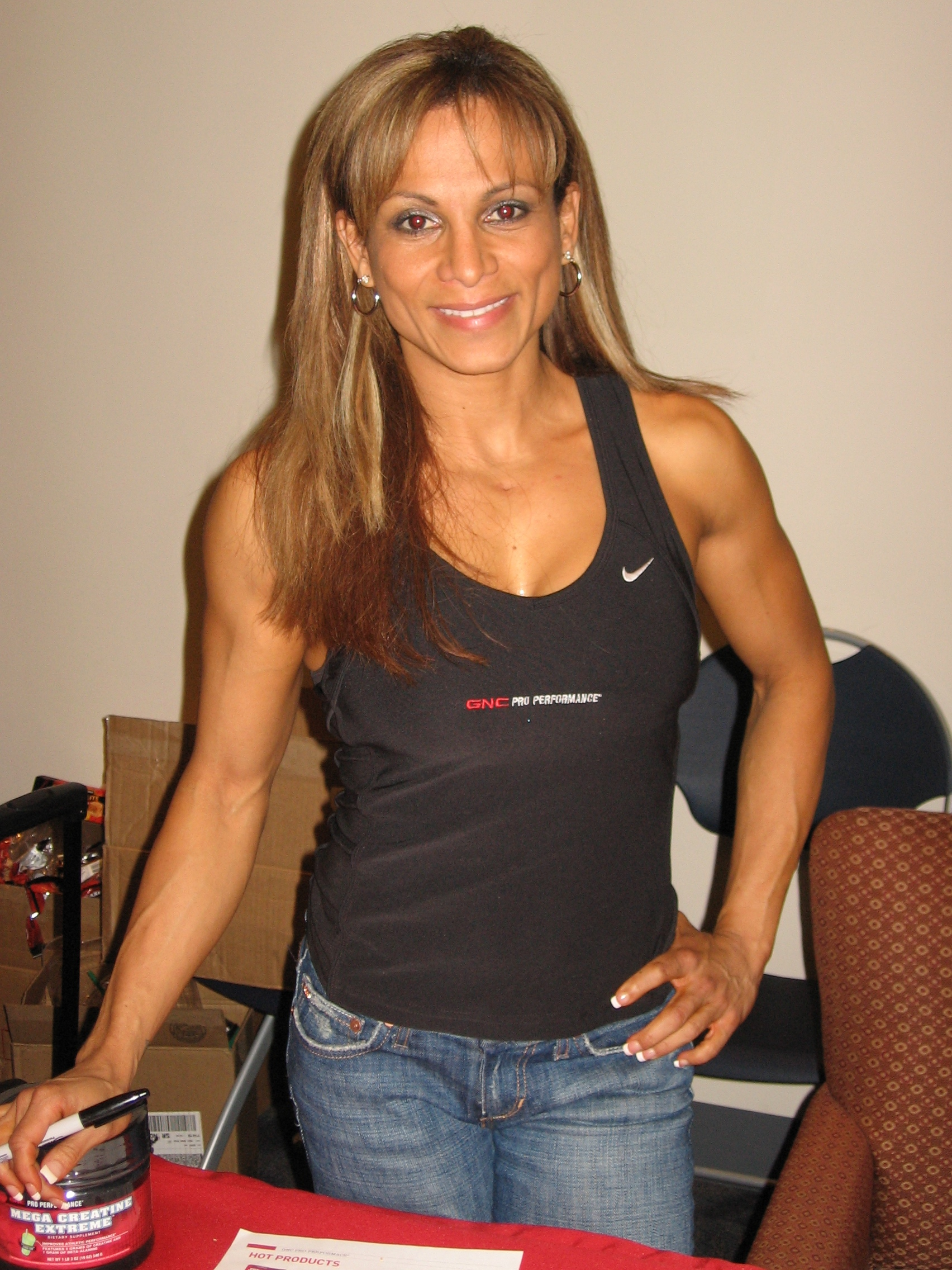

Adela started competing in 1995, with the goal of becoming a fitness professional. She earned her pro card in 1999 by winning the NPC USA Fitness Championships. In 2000, she made her pro debut at the Ms. Fitness International, finishing eighth. Later that year, she qualified for the 2000 Ms. Fitness Olympia by placing ninth place at the Jan Tana Classic. Adela has won several professional titles, most notably the 2004 and 2006 Fitness Olympia, and the 2004 and 2006 Fitness International. For several years, she was married to Brian Friedmansky, and competed as Adela Garcia-Friedmansky. She was engaged to bodybuilder Lee Priest. According to his column in Muscular Development Magazine, Adela and Lee Priest are no longer together and have parted on amicable terms.

== Stats ==
- Took part in IFBB Fitness Olympia competition 13 times (2000-2013, except 2008)

== Contest history ==
- 1995 NPC Europa Sports Fitness Championship - 2nd
- 1996 NPC National Fitness Championship - 12th
- 1996 NPC Pennsylvania Fitness Championship - 4th
- 1998 NPC USA Fitness Championship - 9th (short class)
- 1998 NPC National Fitness Championship - 8th (short class)
- 1998 IFBB North American Fitness Championship - 6th (short class)
- 1998 NPC Junior National Fitness Championship - 2nd (short class)
- 1999 NPC USA Fitness Championship - Overall winner
- 2000 IFBB Fitness International - 8th
- 2000 IFBB Atlantic City Pro Fitness - 6th
- 2000 IFBB Pittsburgh Pro Fitness -5th
- 2000 IFBB Fitness Olympia - 5th
- 2000 IFBB Jan Tana Classic Pro Fitness - 2nd
- 2001 IFBB Fitness International - 3rd
- 2001 IFBB Pittsburgh Pro Fitness - 3rd
- 2001 IFBB Fitness Olympia - 4th
- 2002 IFBB Fitness International - 4th
- 2002 IFBB New York Pro Fitness - 1st
- 2002 IFBB Atlantic States Pro Fitness - 1st
- 2002 IFBB Pittsburgh Pro Fitness - 1st
- 2002 IFBB Fitness Olympia - 4th
- 2002 IFBB GNC Show of Strength Fitness - 2nd
- 2003 IFBB Fitness International - 2nd
- 2003 IFBB New York Pro Fitness - 1st
- 2004 IFBB Fitness International - 1st
- 2004 IFBB Fitness Olympia - 1st
- 2005 IFBB Fitness International - 2nd
- 2005 IFBB Fitness Olympia - 3rd
- 2005 IFBB Sacramento Pro Fitness - 1st
- 2006 IFBB Fitness International - 1st
- 2006 IFBB Fitness Olympia - 1st
- 2007 IFBB Fitness International - 3rd
- 2007 IFBB Houston Pro Figure Contest - 3rd
- 2007 IFBB Europa Super Show - 1st
- 2007 IFBB Fitness Olympia - 1st
- 2009 IFBB Fitness Olympia - 1st
- 2010 IFBB Fitness International - 1st
- 2010 IFBB Fitness Olympia - 1st
- 2011 IFBB Fitness International - 1st
- 2011 IFBB Fitness Olympia - 1st
- 2012 IFBB Fitness International - 1st
- 2012 IFBB Fitness Olympia - 1st
- 2013 IFBB Fitness Olympia - 1st

== See also ==
- List of female fitness & figure competitors
