= Dana Linn Bailey =

American physique competitor

- Professional bodybuilder

Personal info
- Nickname: DLB
- Born: May 30, 1983 (age 43); Reading, Pennsylvania, United States

Best statistics
- Height: 5 ft 4 in (1.63 m)
- Weight: 125 lb (contest)

Professional (Pro) career
- Pro-debut: IFBB Desert Muscle Classic; 2012
- Best win: IFBB Mr Olympia – 1st place; 2013
- Predecessor: None
- Successor: Juliana Malacarne

Dana Linn Bailey is an American IFBB Pro Women's Physique Competitor. She is the winner of Joe Weider's Olympia in 2013.

== Career ==
Dana was recruited to play soccer for West Chester University as a starting defender. She helped lead her team to NCAA's playoffs.

When she graduated from college, she made the transition to lifting, along with her then-boyfriend Rob Bailey. She entered her first figure competition in 2006 at the Lehigh Valley Championships and competed in figure until 2010. She taught Physical Education at Conrad Weiser Middle School in Robesonia, Pennsylvania until 2007, when she retired to focus on her bodybuilding career.

In 2010, participated in the very first Women's Physique show, which was the 2011 Junior USAs in Charleston, South Carolina. She won overall, received her IFBB pro card, and became the first women's physique professional in the NPC/IFBB. Later that year, she made her professional debut at the 2012 Desert Muscle Classic, placing 4th in the lineup. Failing to place at the 2012 New York Pro, she won the 2013 Dallas Europa Supershow, and then captured the inaugural Women’s Physique Olympia title at the 2013 Mr. Olympia. She defended her status at the 2014 Olympia, finishing 2nd, and came in 2nd at the Arnold Classic Ms. International in 2015. She is currently on hiatus from the Olympia competition, focusing on the gym she owns with her husband.

- 2008 NABBA Eastern USA Championships - Figure Overall Winner
- 2008 NABBA Eastern USA Championships - Figure Short, 1st
- 2008 NABBA USA Nationals - Figure Short, 2nd
- 2010 NPC Team Universe Championships - Figure C, 12th
- 2011 NPC Junior USA - Physique A, 1st
- 2011 NPC Junior USA - Physique Overall Winner
- 2012 IFBB Desert Muscle Classic - Physique, 4th
- 2012 IFBB New York Pro - Physique, Did not place
- 2013 IFBB Dallas Europa Supershow - Physique Winner
- 2013 IFBB Mr. Olympia - Physique Winner
- 2014 IFBB Mr. Olympia - Physique, 2nd
- 2015 IFBB Arnold Classic Ms. International - Physique, 2nd
