= Jen Hendershott =

- Professional bodybuilder
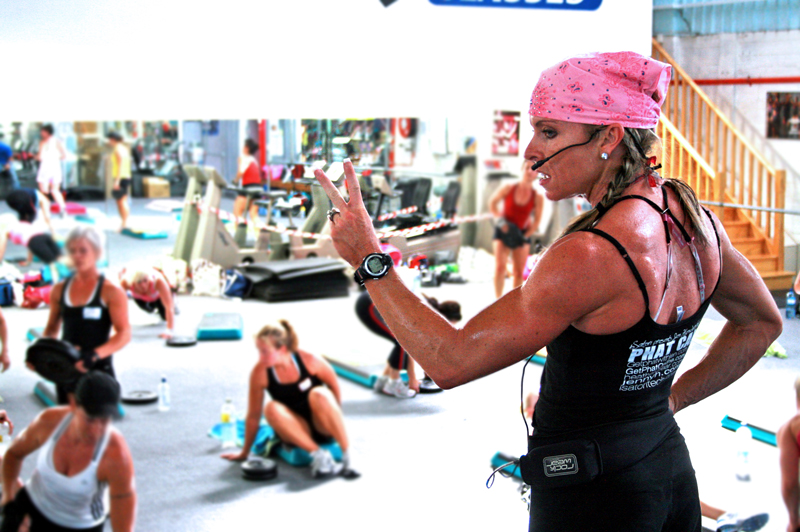
- Jen Hendershott's Phat Camp 2008 Australia

Personal info
- Nickname: Sister Jen, Jen
- Born: December 12, 1971 (age 54); Ashland, Ohio, U.S.

Best statistics
- Height: 5 ft 4 in (1.63 m)
- Weight: (In season) 135-138 lb (Off-season) 138-142 lb

Professional (Pro) career
- Pro-debut: IFBB Fitness International; 2000
- Best win: IFBB Fitness International IFBB Fitness Olympia; 2005
- Predecessor: Adela Garcia
- Successor: Adela Garcia
- Active: since 1997

Jenny Hendershott (born December 12, 1971) is a professional fitness competitor from the United States. In the fitness industry she is well known for her inventive and highly difficult gymnastic routines as well as running her special phat camps all year round where she helps women get serious about their diet, exercise and overall health. Her highest achievement to date has been winning the 2005 Fitness International and 2005 Fitness Olympia events.

Hendershott was second at the 2004 Fitness Olympia and won the title in 2005. She placed third in 2006 and 2007. Hendershott won her second Fitness Olympia in 2008 in Las Vegas, ahead of Tracey Greenwood and Kim Scheideler. It was her last Olympia.

== Vital stats ==
- Full name: Jenny Hendershott
- Birthday: December 12
- Place of birth: Ashland, Ohio
- Current state of residence: Burlington, North Carolina
- Occupation: personal trainer, fitness model, former school teacher.
- Marital status: married to Brian Kinn since 2001.
- Height: 5'4"
- Weight (in season): 135-138 lbs. (Off-season): 138-142 lbs.
- Eye Color: Blue
- Hair Color: blonde (with brown low-lights).

== Bodybuilding philosophy ==
Hendershott's training consists of a combination of simple compound movements with free weights and body weight exercises such as push-ups and bodyweight squats (she sometimes uses machines and cables). She typically trains five days a week in the off-season and on-season focusing on her chest, back, and arms as primary muscle groups in order to make them match her strong legs and shoulders. Jen usually trains two body parts per day in the off-season, and performs one or two cardio sessions a day (one with her weight training and another one at night). She also trains her abs three times a week.

== Contest history ==
- 1997 NPC Mike Francois World Gym Classic, first
- 1997 NPC Junior National Championships, second
- 1997 NPC Nationals Championships, fourth
- 1998 NPC USA Fitness Championships 10th, routine winner
- 1998 NPC North Americans, second, routine winner
- 1998 NPC Nationals Championships, seventh, routine winner
- 1999 NPC USA Fitness Championships, first (pro qualifier)
- 2000 IFBB Fitness International, fifth
- 2000 IFBB Jan Tana Fitness Classic, fourth
- 2000 IFBB Pittsburgh Pro Show, fourth
- 2000 IFBB Fitness Olympia, seventh
- 2001 IFBB Fitness International, fourth
- 2001 IFBB Jan Tana Fitness Classic, second
- 2001 IFBB Pittsburgh Pro Show, second
- 2001 IFBB Fitness Olympia, sixth
- 2002 IFBB Fitness International, third
- 2002 IFBB New York Pro Show, second
- 2002 IFBB Southwest Pro Show, second
- 2002 IFBB Jan Tana Fitness Classic, fourth
- 2002 IFBB Fitness Olympia, fifth
- 2003 IFBB Fitness International, fifth
- 2002 IFBB GNC Show of Strength, fourth
- 2003 IFBB Fitness Olympia, fifth
- 2003 IFBB GNC Show of Strength, third
- 2004 IFBB Fitness International, third
- 2004 IFBB GNC Show of Strength, third
- 2004 IFBB Fitness Olympia, second
- 2005 IFBB Fitness International, first
- 2005 IFBB Fitness Olympia, first
- 2006 IFBB Fitness International, third
- 2006 IFBB Fitness Olympia, third
- 2007 IFBB Fitness International, second
- 2007 IFBB Fitness Olympia, third
- 2008 IFBB Fitness Olympia, first

== Magazine references ==
- Farrar Meyers, Maureen. Champion Chest. California: Muscle and Fitness. August 2006 Edition. ISSN 0744-5105. (New York, NY: Weider Publications, LLC., a division of American Media Inc., 2006.). Section: Training and Fitness: 210-212, 214,216, and 217 covers Hendershott's article.
