= Rachel McLish =

American bodybuilding champion, actress, and author (born 1955)

- ♀ Professional bodybuilder

Personal info
- Née: Elizondo
- Full name: Raquel Livia Elizondo McLish
- Born: Raquel Livia Elizondo; 21 June 1955 (age 71); Harlingen, Texas, US

Best statistics
- Contest weight: 125–135 lb (57–61 kg)
- Height: 5 ft 6.5 in (1.69 m)
- Off-season weight: 135–140 lb (61–64 kg)

Professional (Pro) career
- Pro-debut: International Federation of Bodybuilders Pro Division (IFBB) Ms. Olympia; 1980
- Best wins: Ms. Olympia; 1980 & 1982
- Predecessor: None
- Successors: Ritva Elomaa; Carla Dunlap-Kaan
- Pro years: 1980–1984
Medal record
Ms. Olympia
1st	1980 Ms. Olympia
2nd	1981 Ms. Olympia
1st	1982 Ms. Olympia
2nd	1984 Ms. Olympia
Other IFBB Pro Division contests
1st	1982 World Pro Championships
3rd	1983 Grand Prix Las Vegas
3rd	1984 Grand Prix Las Vegas

Raquel Livia Elizondo McLish (born 21 June 1955) is an American female bodybuilding champion, actress, and author.

== Early life and education ==
McLish was born in 1955 as Raquel Livia Elizondo in Harlingen, Texas. She was the second-youngest daughter of father Rafael, who was of Mexican ancestry, and mother Raquel Elizondo.

She attended Harlingen High School, where she was a cheerleader and twice-named Cardinal’s Football Sweetheart. She graduated in 1973.

In 1978, she graduated from the University of Texas–Pan American with a degree in physiology and health and nutrition.

== Bodybuilding career ==
=== Amateur ===
While attending college, McLish worked at a health club in McAllen, Texas. When she graduated from college, she and the health club manager formed a partnership and founded the Sport Palace Association in Harlingen. With the success of the Sport Palace Association, she opened two more facilities in Corpus Christi and Brownsville in 1980.

She was inspired to compete in bodybuilding thanks to Lisa Lyon and the club manager, Javier Gutierrez, who would show her magazines of female bodybuilders and encourage her to compete. She decided to compete because the opening of her new health club would coincide with a women's bodybuilding contest and bodybuilding would give her a platform to promote fitness to women.

=== Professional ===
McLish merits special historical significance in the sport of women’s bodybuilding. In 1980, she won the inaugural United States Championships, as well as beating Auby Paulick to win that year’s first-ever IFBB Ms. Olympia contest. After her 1980 Olympia win, no woman appeared on more magazine covers for the next five years than her. She got sponsored by Dynamics Health Equipment Manufacturing Corporation. These breakthrough victories, together with her visual appeal, brought women’s bodybuilding a further rush of media attention, which had been jump-started into action by Lyon.

In a competitive career that spanned only four years, McLish proved a resilient force, never placing lower than third in any contest she entered. In 1981, she lost her Ms. Olympia title to Ritva Elomaa, because her physique was not as defined as usual. At the 1982 Ms. Olympia, she beat Carla Dunlap to reclaim her title. Both Paulick and Dunlap brought more muscle than McLish in those respective contests, but neither could match McLish's overall appeal. Dunlap defeated her in the 1983 Caesar's World Cup contest. She finished a controversial second behind Corinna Everson in the 1984 Ms. Olympia. As quoted by several magazines covering the event, some competitors expressed surprise at McLish's high placement because she didn't carry the muscle mass carried by many of the top women. Though Dunlap, who finished fifth, was the defending Ms. Olympia, the cover of the March 1985 Strength Training for Beauty's March 1985 cover declared "Cory dethrones Rachel."

=== Retirement ===
After finishing second at the 1984 IFBB Ms. Olympia, McLish retired from competitive bodybuilding.

=== Contest history ===
- 1980 International Federation of Bodybuilders (IFBB) Frank Zane Invitational – 2nd
- 1980 Superior Physique Association (SPA) US Bodybuilding Championship – 1st
- 1980 IFBB Professional Division (IFBB) Ms. Olympia – 1st
- 1981 IFBB Ms. Olympia – 2nd
- 1982 IFBB World Pro Championships – 1st
- 1982 IFBB Ms. Olympia – 1st
- 1983 IFBB Grand Prix Las Vegas - 3rd
- 1984 IFBB Grand Prix Las Vegas - 3rd
- 1984 IFBB Ms. Olympia – 2nd

=== Legacy ===
McLish was the first winner of the Ms. Olympia title. She is one of bodybuilding’s most recognizable personalities. In January 1999, she was inducted into the IFBB Hall of Fame.

== Filmography ==
McLish was featured in the 1985 documentary Pumping Iron II: The Women, which focused on her participation in the 1983 Caesar’s World Cup. She also co-starred alongside Arnold Schwarzenegger in the fitness instructional video Shape Up (1982).

She acted in Getting Physical (1984), Aces: Iron Eagle III (1992) and Raven Hawk (1996), movies in which she played the part of a physically strong woman. She was one of the first women to take such a role.

McLish also starred in Herb Alpert's 'Red Hot' music video.

== Author ==
McLish has authored two books on weight training for women that made the New York Times bestseller list – Flex Appeal, by Rachel, and Perfect Parts. She is now working on two books that focus on fitness and nutrition.

== Personal life ==
McLish is a Christian and describes herself as a compassionate conservative.

While attending Pan American University, she met John P. McLish, whom she married on February 3, 1979. They later divorced, in 1990.

In 1990, she married film producer Ron Samuels. She and her husband lived in Rancho Mirage, California in 1996. In 2008, she sold her house for $3 million to Boston Red Sox player Coco Crisp.

Ms. Olympia
Preceded by: -	First (1980)	Succeeded by: Kike Elomaa
Preceded by: Kike Elomaa	Second (1982)	Succeeded by: Carla Dunlap
