= Oksana Grishina (fitness pro) =

Russian gymnast and fitness pro competitor

- Professional bodybuilder
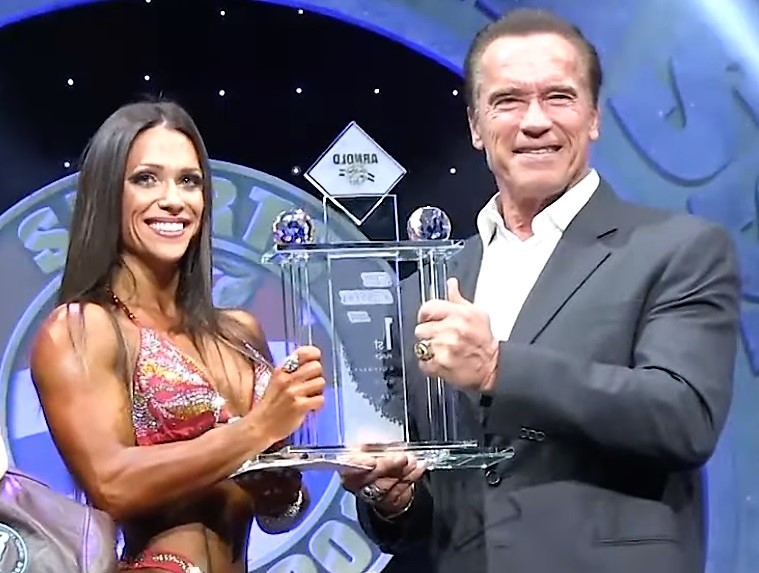
- Grishina receiving award from Arnold Schwarzenegger at the 2014 Arnold Classic

Personal info
- Full name: Oksana Grishina
- Born: 25 March 1978 (age 48); Kaliningrad, Russian SFSR, Soviet Union

Best statistics
- Height: 5 ft 3 in (1.60 m)
- Weight: 114 lb (52 kg)

Professional (Pro) career
- Pro-debut: NPC Europa IFBB Pro Super Show; 2007
- Best win: Ms. Fitness Olympia four times; 2014 - 2017
- Predecessor: Adela Garcia

Oksana Grishina (Russian: Окса́на Гри́шина; born 25 March 1978) is a Russian former gymnast and professional fitness competitor. She retired from competitive fitness in 2017, after earning her fourth consecutive Ms. Fitness Olympia title and winning ten consecutive Arnold Classic competitions. Grishina currently runs a pole fitness competition league, Oksana Grishina's O.G. Pole Fitness, which holds a professional pole sport championship at the Mr. Olympia in Las Vegas, and a pro-am pole fitness competition at the Legion Sports Fest in Long Beach, California.

Grishina was born in Kaliningrad and grew up both in Latvia and Russia. She earned a degree in 2000 from the University of Kaliningrad as a specialist in Physical Training and Sports.

Grishina won both European and World overall championships titles, while competing as amateur. She earned her IFBB Pro Card in 2007. Grishina is the second ever Russian athlete to earn an IFBB Fitness Pro card

She currently lives in California, USA.

== Early life ==
Grishina was born in Kaliningrad, Russia. When her father moved to Riga her mother decided to put her in gymnastics as a way to direct her energy. When she was 10 years her father was reassigned to a new post in Russia. This job came with a guarantee of government housing, which meant that they would be in a settled place. However, there was no gymnastics school in that city. Her coach in Riga offered her the chance to stay there and continue her training. Her father was able to move her family to Kaliningrad but they changed apartments often and she moved from school to school. She spent countless hours going to a gymnastics school in a bus and by foot and she rarely saw her parents.

== 2000–2002 ==
She went to University in Kaliningrad and in 2000 she earned a degree as a specialist in Physical Training and Sports. During her university years and for several years later she organized her own ballet "Antares". She also worked as a choreographer with children at the Tchaikovsky School of Music and art in Kaliningrad.

== 2002–present ==
At that time there were no gyms in Kaliningrad. When the first gym opened in 2002, one of her friends suggested her to work as a fitness and aerobic instructor. A few trainers at the gym told her she had a good structure for bodybuilding. She took their advice, started training, and later discovered competitive fitness. She spent several years working as a trainer and manager in sports clubs while quickly rising to the top of competitive fitness in Russia. In 2005 and 2006 she was awarded the title of “Best Non-Olympic Sportswoman of the Year” in the Kaliningrad Region. While winning fitness competitions on the international stage at the European and world championships, she finally earned her IFBB pro card to compete in the 2007 Olympia. She has been in the United States for over three years and now lives in California. She continues to work as a personal trainer, fitness consultant, and fitness model.

== Titles ==
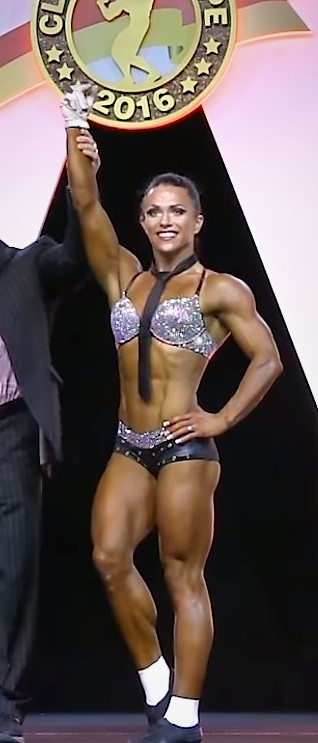
Grishina victorious at the 2016 Arnold Classic Europe

1993 "Master of Sports of Russia" in Rhythmic Gymnastics

2000 Kaliningrad State University Diploma DVS, Specialist in Physical Training and sports;

2004 "Master of Sports of Russia" in Bodybuilding

2004 "Master of Sports of Russia of International Class" in Bodybuilding

2004–2006 Russian Championship, Overall Fitness Champion

2005–2006 Awarded Best Non-Olympic Sportswoman of the Year in the Kaliningrad Region

2005 European Championship, Overall Fitness Champion

2006 World Championship, Overall Fitness Champion

2007 All Star Pro Fitness, 3rd Place

2007 Europa Super Show, Fitness, 16th Place

2007 IFBB Olympia, Fitness, 7th Place

2008 New York Pro Fitness Classic, Fitness, 7th Place

2008 Arnold Classic, Fitness, 10th Place

2009 Arnold Classic, Fitness, 9th Place

2010 Phoenix Pro, Fitness, 4th Place

2010 Arnold Classic, Fitness, 5th Place

2010 IFBB Olympia, Fitness Division, 5th Place

2011 IFBB Olympia, Fitness Division, 5th Place

2012 FLEX Pro, Fitness, 2nd Place

2012 Arnold Classic, Fitness, 3rd Place

2012 St. Louis Pro, Fitness, 1st Place

2012 IFBB Olympia, Fitness Division, 2nd Place

2012 Arnold Classic Europe, Fitness, 1st Place

2012 Ft Lauderdale Cup, Fitness, 1st Place

2013 Arnold Classic, Fitness, 2nd Place

2014 Arnold Classic, Fitness, 1st Place

2014 IFBB Olympia, Fitness Division, 1st Place

2015 Arnold Classic, Fitness, 1st Place

2015 IFBB Olympia, Fitness Division, 1st Place

2016 IFBB Olympia, Fitness Division, 1st Place

2017 IFBB Olympia, Fitness Division, 1st Place

2020 IFBB Olympia, Fitness Division, 2nd Place

2021 IFBB Olympia, Fitness Division, 3rd Place

2023 IFBB Olympia, Fitness Division, 1st Place
