= Carol Semple-Marzetta =

American professional fitness competitor (born 1966)

Carol Semple
- professional bodybuilder

Personal info
- Born: February 23, 1966 (age 59)

Best statistics
- Height: 5 ft 5 in (165 cm)
- Weight: 125–127 lb (57–58 kg) In-Season; 135–138 lb (61–63 kg) Off-Season

Professional (Pro) career
- Pro-debut: IFBB Ms. Olympia Fitness; 1995
- Best win: IFBB Fitness Olympia Champion; 1997
- Predecessor: Saryn Muldrow
- Successor: Monica Brant
- Active: Retired 1997

Carol Semple (born February 23, 1966) is an American professional fitness competitor. In regional, national and international competitions, she has won 15 titles.

== Early life ==
Semple began gymnastics training at the age of 10. Her dream was to compete in Olympics gymnastics events. However, she was found to have Osgood-Schlatter disease, a childhood condition in which the bones grow faster than the muscles they support. This, along with the financial burden associated with training, ended her dream of Olympic competition. The severe injuries she suffered in an auto accident on May 23, 1983, meant she had to give up gymnastics entirely.

== Career in fitness ==
Semple worked as a fitness instructor at a local spa during her 20s. While training there, she became aware of the Ms. National Fitness competition and started training for it. She was the first person to win the Ms. Fitness USA and the Ms. Fitness World back-to-back, and to win the Ms. Fitness USA and the Ms. Fitness World in the same year. She was also the first to win the Fitness International in 1997 and the first to win the Fitness International and the Fitness Olympia in the same year.

== Competition record ==
1991

- 1991 NFSB Ms. Fitness Colorado, 1st
- 1991 NFSB Ms. National Fitness, 3rd
- 1991 NFSB Ms. Fitness USA, 2nd

1992

- 1992 NFSB Ms. National Fitness, 1st

1993

- 1993 NFSB Ms. National Fitness, 1st
- 1993 Ms. Galaxy Obstacle Course, 1st
- 1993 NFSB Ms. Fitness USA, 2nd

1994

- 1994 NFSB Ms. Fitness USA, 1st
- 1994 IFSB Ms. Fitness World, 1st

1995

- 1995 NFSB Ms. Fitness USA, 1st
- 1995 IFSB Ms. Fitness World, 1st
- 1995 IFBB Fitness Olympia, 2nd

1996

- 1996 IFBB Fitness Olympia, 5th

1997

- 1997 IFBB Fitness International, 1st
- 1997 IFBB Fitness Olympia, 1st
