= Yeshaira Robles =

Puerto Rican fitness model

- Professional bodybuilder

Personal info
- Born: December 29, 1982 (age 42); The Bronx, New York City, United States

Best statistics
- Height: 5 ft 5 in (1.65 m)
- Weight: 118 lb (54 kg)

Professional (Pro) career
- Pro-debut: Pro World Masters Championships; 2011
- Best win: Bikini Olympia, 2nd; 2013

Yeshaira Robles is an American IFBB Pro fitness and figure competitor (bikini category) and fitness model of Puerto Rican extraction. She won the 2nd place in 2013 Bikini Olympia.

Starting at local NPC events, Robles won her IFBB Pro card after winning the 2011 NPC Team Universe Bikini competition.
