= Candy Csencsits =

American bodybuilder and actress

- Born: Candace Marie Pitts; December 29, 1955; Northampton County, Pennsylvania, U.S.
- Died: January 13, 1989 (aged 33); Tulsa County, Oklahoma, U.S.
- Occupation(s): Bodybuilder, athlete, actress
- Height: 5 ft 5 in (1.65 m)
- Spouse: Frank Csencsits (19??-1989; her death)
- professional bodybuilder

Best statistics

Professional (Pro) career
- Pro-debut: 1980
- Best win: IFBB Ms. Olympia 2nd place; 1983
- Predecessor: Carla Dunlap
- Successor: Rachel McLish
- Active: 1984

Candace Marie Csencsits (née Pitts; December 29, 1955 – January 13, 1989) was an American professional female bodybuilder and actress in the early 1980s.

== Biography ==
Born Candace Marie Pitts in Northampton County, Pennsylvania, to Theodore and Helen Pitts, she became interested in bodybuilding during college while majoring in physical education. She placed 5th in her first show and after competing in several shows she achieved professional status. As a professional bodybuilder and spokesperson for the sport, she became a pioneer in drug testing for women bodybuilders, served as a judge for the IFBB and was a president of the American Federation of Women's Body Building.

She was also an actress. In 1984, she had a role in a TV movie about bodybuilding called Getting Physical. In the 80s she competed against the likes of Rachel McLish, Carla Dunlap, and Cory Everson. She placed second in the 1982 Pro World Championship. She also finished in the top ten in the Ms. Olympia contest in 1981 and 1982. She was at her competitive peak in 1983, when she was runner-up to Dunlap for Ms. Olympia.

== Death ==
In 1984 after competing in the 1984 Ms. Olympia, Csencsits was diagnosed with breast cancer. This put an end to her competitive career. She continued to promote the sport while undergoing treatment. She died on January 13, 1989, at her home in Tulsa County, Oklahoma, aged 33.

== Competition history ==
- 1981 IFBB Ms. Olympia - 6th
- 1981 World Grand Prix - 5th
- 1982 IFBB Ms. Olympia - 7th
- 1982 IFBB Pro World Championship - 2nd
- 1983 IFBB Ms. Olympia - 2nd
- 1983 IFBB Pro World Championship - 5th
- 1984 IFBB Ms. Olympia - 12th

== Filmography as actress ==
- Getting Physical (1984; TV) - Janine Daley
