= Monica Brant =

American fitness and figure competitor

- Professional bodybuilder

Personal info
- Nickname: Mo
- Born: October 26, 1970 (age 56); Fort Hood, Texas

Best statistics
- Height: 5 ft 4 in (1.63 m)
- Weight: (In Season): 127-130 lb (Off-Season):138-142 lb

Professional (Pro) career
- Pro-debut: 1991 Fitness USA Preliminary; 1991
- Best win: 1995 Jan Tana Pro Fitness Champion 1998 Ms. Fitness Olympia Champion 2010 WBFF World Pro Figure Champion 2013 WBFF World Pro Figure Champion; Best year (1995) and (1998)
- Predecessor: Carol Semple-Marzetta
- Successor: Mary Yockey
- Active: since 1991

Monica Brant (born October 26, 1970) is an IFBB professional figure competitor and a former fitness competitor. Brant won the 1998 Ms. Fitness Olympia. She first appeared on the cover of Muscle & Fitness in November 1994 and has, according to her website, appeared on over 100 international magazine covers.

== Biography ==
She was born in Fort Hood, Texas and raised on a 20-acre (81,000 m^{2}) ranch in a small town outside of San Antonio called Castroville. Her mother had a professional horse training business. By the time she was 14, she was giving riding lessons and training horses on her own with occasional advice from her mother. Along with volleyball and track in high school, she competed in many events: western pleasure, barrels and pole bending, English pleasure, dressage, and Hunter/Jumper.

After Brant graduated, her love of horses took her to a fine arts college in Fulton, Missouri, where she studied basics and equestrian science for her first year. Unable to return for further studies in Missouri, Brant took classes at San Antonio College in Texas, and gave riding lessons at nearby stables. She also did promotional work for Budweiser, waitressed, and competed in bikini contests for extra funds.

In 1991, Brant started lifting weights with a friend and saw a photo of Marla Duncan winning a national competition. Duncan's beauty and physique impressed her enough that she wanted to try fitness competition herself. Up until 1995 she only competed for fun, not as a money-making career. In 1994 she was honored with a Muscle & Fitness cover. This helped Brant realize that she had the potential to earn money in the fitness industry. She kept competing and in April 1995 moved to the Los Angeles area. Once she arrived, Brant dove into what would become her career and competed in the IFBB organization two to three times per year.

After competing in the Fitness Olympia three times from 1995 to 1997, she won her first and only Olympia title in 1998.

After placing second twice after her 1998 victory, Brant retired from fitness competition, saying that the gymnastics demands of winning were too great for her.

Brant returned to competition in 2003 with the announcement that figure competition would be part of the sport of bodybuilding. After placing 3rd in the 2006 Figure Olympia, Brant decided to take a break from other competitions and focus on the 2007 Olympia. She placed 7th in the 2007 Figure Olympia competition. In September 2010, Brant returned to compete in figure once again, taking to the WBFF World Pro Championship stage in Toronto. She took first place at the competition and landed a cover on Oxygen Magazine in January 2011.

In August 2013, Brant won the WBFF World Pro Championship for the second time and retired from figure competition.

At the 2013 World Masters Athletics Championships in Porto Alegre, Brazil, she placed in the top three in all of her events: second in the 100 m, third in the 200 m and 400 m, and first in the 4 × 100 m and 4 × 400 m relays.

== Contest history ==
- 1991 Fitness USA Preliminary 1st
- 1991 Ms. National Fitness 14th
- 1993 Fitness USA Preliminary 6th
- 1994 Fitness USA Preliminary 1st
- 1994 Ms. National Fitness 6th
- 1995 Fitness USA Nationals 9th
- 1995 IFBB Jan Tana Pro Fitness 1st
- 1995 IFBB Fitness Olympia 7th
- 1996 Fitness International 2nd
- 1996 IFBB Fitness Olympia 7th
- 1996 IFBB Night Of Champions 4th
- 1996 IFBB Jan Tana Pro Fitness 2nd
- 1998 IFBB Fitness Olympia 1st
- 1999 IFBB Fitness Olympia 4th
- 2003 Figure International – 2nd
- 2003 Figure Olympia – 2nd
- 2003 Show of Strength Pro Championship, Figure – 2nd
- 2004 Figure International – 2nd
- 2004 Figure Olympia – 3rd
- 2005 Figure International – 2nd
- 2005 Figure Olympia – 3rd
- 2005 Sacramento Pro Championships, Figure – 3rd
- 2005 San Francisco Pro Championships, Figure – 2nd
- 2006 Figure International – 2nd
- 2006 Figure Olympia – 3rd
- 2007 Figure Olympia – 7th
- 2009 Figure International – 6th
- 2010 Figure International – 7th
- 2010 WBFF World Pro Figure Champion – 1st
- 2013 WBFF World Pro Figure Champion – 1st

== See also ==
- List of female fitness & figure competitors
