= Georgia Fudge =

American bodybuilder

- professional bodybuilder

Personal info
- Nickname: Georgia Miller
- Born: American

Best statistics

Professional (Pro) career
- Pro-debut: 1979 Robby Robinson Classic; 1979
- Best win: 1983 World Grand Prix 4th place; 1979-1981
- Active: Retired 1984

Georgia Fudge (also known as Georgia Miller) was one of the first professional female bodybuilders in the early 1980s. At a height of 5 ft 8 in, she competed at a bodyweight of around 125–130 lb.

Georgia Fudge is in Florida. While she no longer models, she remains active in the fitness and wellness industry. She is a certified personal trainer with over three decades of fitness experience. She trains men and women at the LA Fitness several days every week. She has also previously competed and trained under the names of Georgia Fig and Georgia Miller.

== Contest history ==
- 1979 Robby Robinson Classic – 4th
- 1980 Frank Zane Invitational – 6th
- 1980 US Bodybuilding Championship – 2nd
- 1980 International Federation of BodyBuilders (IFBB) Ms. Olympia – 10th
- 1981 World Grand Prix – 4th
- 1981 Pro World Championship – 7th
- 1981 IFBB Ms. Olympia – 5th
- 1982 Pro World Championship – 7th
- 1982 IFBB Ms. Olympia – 11th
- 1983 Pro World Championship – 9th
- 1983 IFBB Ms. Olympia – 13th
