= Lynn Conkwright =

American bodybuilder

- Professional bodybuilder

Personal info
- Nickname: Giant Killer, Southern Belle, Flexible Femme
- Born: May 30, 1954; Norfolk, Virginia, US
- Died: June 14, 2017 (aged 63); Norfolk, Virginia, US

Best statistics

Professional (Pro) career
- Pro-debut: 1980 Miss Virginia Beach Champion; 1980
- Best win: Pro World Championships; 1980-1983
- Active: Retired 1988

Lynn Conkwright (May 30, 1954 – June 14, 2017) was a professional female bodybuilder from the United States.

== Biography ==
Lynn was born on May 30, 1954, in Norfolk, Virginia. Conkwright trained for eight years in gymnastics, and won the Virginia State Gymnastics Championships. She began weight training to improve her gymnastics.

Despite her small stature (5' tall and just over 100 pounds), she was one of the top professional competitors in the early 1980s. During her competitive career she became known for her incredible flexibility during her performances. Her greatest success was winning the 1981 Pro World Championship. She also won the couples competition with Chris Dickerson in the same contest. Lynn competed in the first six Ms. Olympia contests (the only other woman to do so was Carolyn Cheshire), twice finishing as high as third.

Lynn was selected by ABC to represent women's bodybuilding in the women's Superstars competition in 1982, where she finished tenth in a field of twelve competitors. Conkwright placed first in rowing, third in basketball shooting, third in swimming, fifth in the bicycle race, fifth in golf, and seventh in the obstacle course. After retiring in 1988, Lynn continued to be active in the fitness industry. In late 1988 and early 1989 at the age of 34 she became the first United States Sports Academy student to be certified as a bodybuilding coach after the United States Sports Academy began offering a Masters of Sport Science in Fitness Management. This suited Lynn very well since at one time she was the weight training coach for tennis superstar Martina Navratilova.

Later, Conkwright worked as the director of Weider Athlete Promotions and managed Weider contracted athletes. She was inducted into the IFBB Hall of Fame in 2003.

== Contest history ==
- 1980 NPC Miss Virginia Beach - 1st
- 1980 NPC USA Championship - 5th
- 1980 NPC Frank Zane Invitational - 3rd
- 1980 IFBB Ms. Olympia - 3rd
- 1981 IFBB Pro World Championships - 1st
- 1981 IFBB World Couples (with Chris Dickerson) - 1st
- 1981 IFBB Ms. Olympia - 3rd
- 1982 IFBB Ms. Olympia - 4th
- 1983 IFBB Ms. Olympia - 4th
- 1984 IFBB Ms. Olympia - 8th
- 1985 IFBB Ms. Olympia - 16th
- 1988 IFBB Pro World Championship - 14th

== Magazine covers ==
- 1981 August Muscle & Fitness
- 1982 September Body & Power
