= List of female fitness and figure competitors =

This is a list of female fitness and figure competitors.

== A ==
- Jelena Abbou

== B ==
- Alexandra Béres
- Sharon Bruneau

== C ==
- Natalie Montgomery-Carroll
- Jen Cassetty
- Kim Chizevsky
- Susie Curry

== D ==
- Debbie Dobbins

== E ==
- Jamie Eason
- Alexis Ellis

== F ==
- Amy Fadhli

== G ==
- Adela García
- Connie Garner
- Elaine Goodlad
- Tracey Greenwood
- Oksana Grishina

== H ==
- Mallory Haldeman
- Vanda Hădărean
- Jen Hendershott
- April Hunter

== J ==
- Tsianina Joelson

== K ==
- Adria Montgomery-Klein
- Ashley Kaltwasser

== L ==
- Mary Elizabeth Lado
- Tammie Leady
- Jennifer Nicole Lee
- Amber Littlejohn
- Julie Lohre
- Jenny Lynn

== M ==
- Timea Majorová
- Davana Medina
- Jodi Leigh Miller
- Chisato Mishima

== N ==
- Kim Nielsen

== P ==
- Vicky Pratt
- Elena Panova
- Christine Pomponio-Pate
- Cathy Priest

== Q ==
- Rhonda Lee Quaresma

== R ==
- Charlene Rink
- Kelly Ryan

== S ==
- Erin Stern
- Carol Semple-Marzetta
- Krisztina Sereny
- Trish Stratus (Patricia Anne Stratigias)

== T ==
- Kristi Tauti
- Jennifer Thomas

== V ==
- Lisa Marie Varon

== W ==
- Latisha Wilder
- Torrie Wilson
- Jenny Worth
- Nicole Wilkins

== Z ==
- Marietta Žigalová
- Malika Zitouni

== See also ==
- List of female professional bodybuilders
