= Gina Aliotti =

American figure competitor

Gina Aliotti (born July 20, 1984) is an IFBB professional figure competitor. She is well known for her wins in the IFBB woman's figure professional circuit including wins at the Tournament of Champions Pro Figure (2006, 2007, and 2008), the West Palm Beach Pro Figure (2007), and the Arnold Classic Pro Figure (2007). She is owner of GinaAliotti.com (M&GFitness) through which she and her team conduct sales and consulting for exercise and nutrition.

== Contest History ==
Year	Event	Result	Division
2004	NPC Border states	1st	Figure
2004	NPC San Francisco	3rd	Figure
2005	NPC World’s Gym	1st	Overall
2005	NPC USA Class winner and Earned Pro Card	1st	Class
2006	IFBB Colorado Pro Figure	6th	Figure
2006	IFBB California Pro Figure (qualified for the Olympia)	4th	Figure
2006	IFBB TOC Pro Figure	1st	Figure
2006	IFBB Pro Figure Olympia	6th	Figure
2006	IFBB Pro West Palm Beach	2nd	Figure
2007	IFBB Arnold Classic	6th	Figure
2007	IFBB TOC Pro Figure	1st	Figure
2007	NIFBB Figure Olympia	2nd	Figure
2007	IFBB West Palm Beach Pro Figure	1st	Figure
2008	IFBB Arnold Classic Pro Figure	1st	Figure
2008	IFBB TOC Pro Figure	1st	Figure
2008	IFBB Figure Olympia	2nd	Figure
2009	IFBB Arnold Classic	2nd	Figure
2009	IFBB Olympia	2nd	Figure

== See also ==
- List of female fitness & figure competitors
