= Christine Pomponio-Pate =

American fitness competitor

- Occupation: Fitness model

Christine Pomponio-Pate is a figure model and actress who has competed and placed at the Figure Olympia and appeared in Muscle & Fitness, Flex, and Ironman magazines. Pomponio-Pate has always enjoyed pushing her body and was athletic and competitive at most sports she tried. Her primary athletic interest was soccer. She played soccer for ten years.

== Early start ==
Christine was born in 1975 to Phil and Michelle Pomponio in Denver, Colorado Following the lead of her brother who had begun powerlifting, she began working out with weights while still in high school. In 1994, however, a serious car accident brought her workouts to an abrupt halt.

== 1994 auto accident ==
The former soccer player passed out due to low blood sugar. Her car crossed the median and hit a truck head-on. Mechanical failure kept her seatbelt from being fastened, leaving nothing to prevent her from exiting through the windshield. She hit the steering wheel with her face, causing severe oral damage on the way out. She was semi-conscious the next two days. Six years of difficult recovery followed.

Christine was out of work for two months and it took six years and 11 surgeries to reconstruct her injuries to pre-wreck status.

== Recovery ==
Despite the extensive damage she received in the accident, the only outwardly visible sign is a small scar on her lip. She suffered massive oral injuries in the wreck, damaging her teeth as well as cutting her lip off. On the day of the crash, her teeth were removed from the back of the roof of her mouth and moved forward without anesthesia due to the concussion she suffered in the accident. There was also a period of time during which she was in danger of losing a leg.

"They took skin from the inside of my mouth to reconstruct my upper lip.... It took more than two years until I felt normal again.... I was self-conscious about the stitches and wires, but I kept it in perspective and was still thankful for the outcome. I could have been paralyzed or a lot worse." "It's fairly numb (her face from nerve damage), but I'm so lucky to have my life and no physical handicaps. That's motivation to continue to work out and compete. I definitely don't feel sorry for myself. It makes me who I am." "I will compete as long as it stays fun." "I feel lucky to have my life and abilities after the accident, so I need to take advantage of what I'm still blessed with.".

== Fitness training ==
Christine began weight training as a way to be active after the accident and as rehab. By 1999, that part-time training led to her competing in her first contest, the Colorado State Fitness Championships. Success was immediate, as she won the fitness overall title. She decided to move to the national levels where she competed at the 1999 USA Championships and the 2000 Nationals. At the 2001 Team Universe, she won the short class and was able to earn her pro card.

Being an athlete most of her life, early success on the stage came easy while success with the gymnastic heavy routines was more difficult.

"I was a backyard gymnast. My mandatories were strong but I wasn't a well-trained gymnast, so my routines were entertaining but pretty basic.

The creation of the Pro Figure Division in 2003 gave an avenue more suited for her.

== Early competitions ==
After semi struggling in early competitions, however, fate smiled on her in 2004 at the California Pro Figure Championships where she placed 6th. After this Pomponio - Pate achieved a runner-up finish at the New York Pro Figure. She finished the year by making the Top 6 at the sport's mega event, the Figure Olympia.

1999, Colorado Fitness Championship, Overall Winner

In 2005, she won the Pro Figure Tournament of Champions.

In 2006, she won the California Pro Figure.

== Outside interest ==
The figure pro athlete is currently working in local television commercials and modeling as well as competitions.

She also does consulting and modeling work through her website.

== Career pause ==
She announced that she would not compete in the 2007 Olympia due to her pregnancy.

"In 2004 I was extremely excited to get 6th, then in 2005 I was pleased with 6th again although hoped I would move up, then in 2006 I was extremely happy and very content with placing 4th. All of the improvement depended on me, you can't predict how the other competitors will affect you and I don't believe in any luck in this situation. It is a lot of hard work and again a confident, positive attitude. My prediction for me in the 2007 Olympia is that I probably would stand out in an odd way since I will be seven months pregnant at that time."

== Career achievements ==
- 2004 Figure Olympia—6th
- 2005 Arnold Figure Classic—4th
- 2005 Figure Olympia—6th
- 2005 Pro Figure Tournament of Champions—1st
- 2006 Figure Olympia—4th
- 2006 IFBB CO Pro/Am—3rd
- 2006 IFBB CA Pro Championship—1st

== Selected magazine covers and appearances ==
- Muscle & Fitness Hers magazine, August 2009
- Ironman magazine, November 2006
- Flex, September 2006
  - Flex 2005 Swimsuit Issue
- Flex 2006 Swimsuit Issue
- Flex 2007 Swimsuit Issue
- Muscle and Fitness, September 2005
- CORE Magazine
- MuscleMag International, 2005

== Personal ==
She is single
