= Goodlad =

Goodlad is a surname. Notable people with the surname include:

- Alastair Goodlad, Baron Goodlad (born 1943), British politician and High Commissioner to Australia
- Elaine Goodlad (born 1964), Canadian figure competitor and makeup artist
- Hannah Goodlad, Scottish politician
- John Goodlad (1920–2014), American educational researcher and theorist
- Mark Goodlad (born 1979), footballer
- William Goodlad, 17th-century whaler and admiral of the Muscovy Company

== See also ==
- Goodlad's stinkfish (Callionymus goodladi), a species of ray-finned fish in the genus Callionymus
