= Julie Lohre =

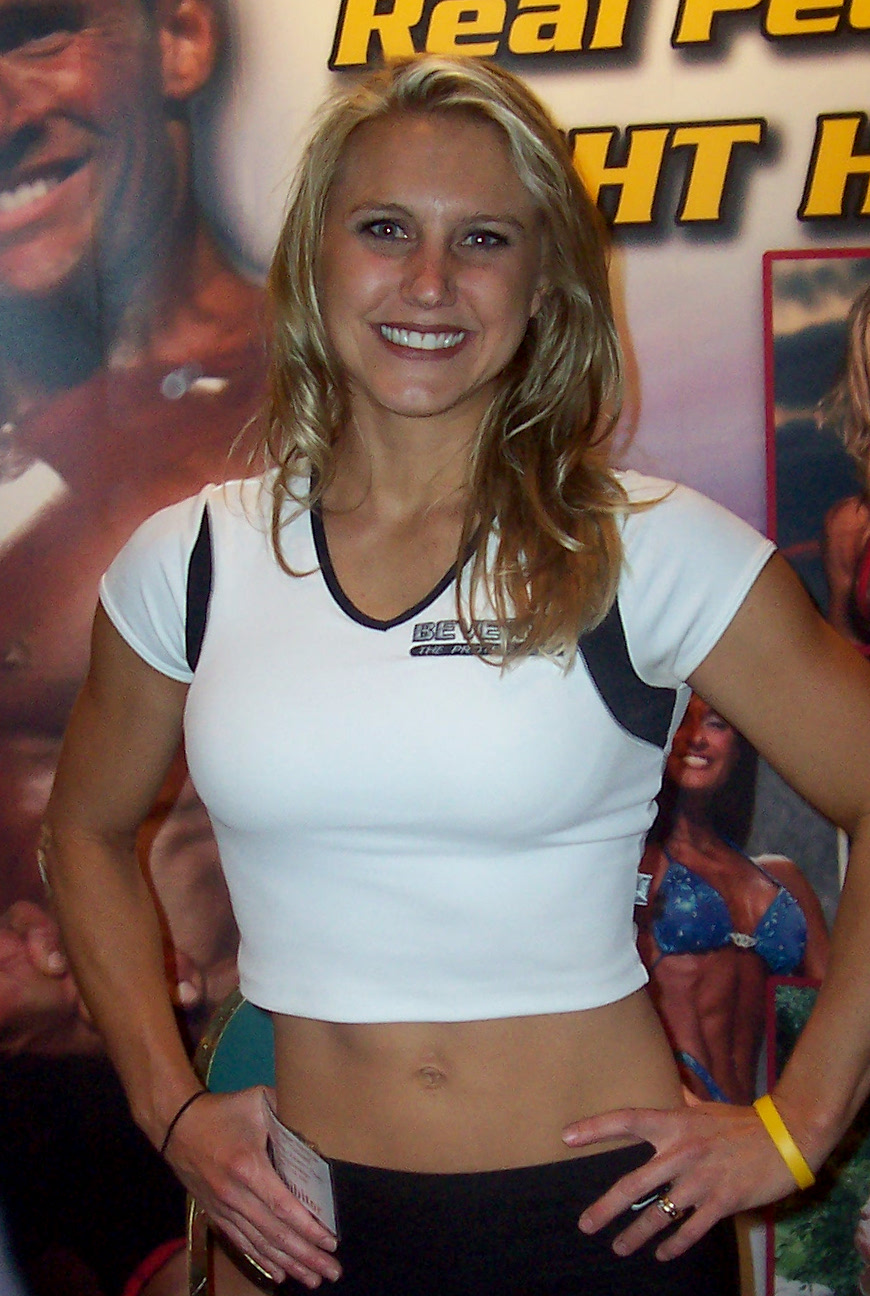
Julie Lohre in 2005

Julie Lohre (born September 12, 1974, Julie Trauth) is a professional fitness competitor from the United States. She is well known in the fitness industry for her intense and entertaining gymnastic routines. She is one of the fitness industry pioneers of online personal training. She is recognized as one of the top 50 online personal trainers in the world. She has achieved a high level of success in the IFBB and includes top 5 finishes in the top competitions in the sport of fitness, including the Fitness Olympia and Arnold Classic. She has also competed in the Crossfit Games, appeared on NBC's American Ninja Warrior, was a leading candidate for NBC's Biggest Loser Trainer spot and is featured regularly in magazines such as Muscle & Fitness, Esquire, Oxygen, FLEX, GORGO Women's Fitness and other health industry magazines.

== Vital Stats ==
- Full name: Julie Michelle Lohre
- Birthday: September 12
- Place of Birth: Cincinnati, Ohio
- Current residence: Kentucky
- Occupation: Online Personal Trainer, Writer, Fitness Model
- Height: 5' 5"
- Weight: 130
- Eye Color: Green
- Hair Color: Blonde
- Ethnicity: Caucasian

== Career & Contest history ==
IFBB Competitions

- 2008 IFBB Fitness Olympia
- 2008 IFBB Fitness International – 4th
- 2007 IFBB Fitness – Palm Beach Pro – 2nd
- 2007 IFBB Fitness Olympia – 8th
- 2007 IFBB Fitness – Atlantic City Pro – 3rd
- 2007 IFBB All Star Fitness 2nd
- 2007 IFBB Europa Super Show 4th
- 2006 IFBB Fitness – Palm Beach Pro – 3rd
- 2006 IFBB Fitness – Atlantic City Pro – 4th
- 2006 IFBB Fitness – Europa Super Show 7th
- 2006 IFBB Fitness – All Star Fitness 5th
- 2006 IFBB Figure – Pittsburgh Pro 12th
- 2006 IFBB Figure – San Francisco Pro 8th
- 2005 IFBB Figure – Charlotte Pro 10th
- 2005 IFBB Figure – Europa Super Show 4th

Amateur and NPC Competitions

- 2004 NPC Nationals Fitness 2nd – Earned IFBB Pro Card – Best Routine of Show – Special Award
- 2004 NPC USA's Fitness 6th
- 2004 NPC Pittsburgh Fitness 1st and Overall
- 2004 NPC Pittsburgh Figure 5th
- 2004 NPC Cincinnati Figure 1st and Overall
- 2003 NPC Natural Northern USA's Figure 1st
- 2003 NPC Indianapolis Figure 1st
- 2003 NPC Cincinnati Figure 2nd
- 2003 NPC Northern Kentucky Figure 1st and Overall
- 2004 WWE Diva Search Semi-Finalist
- 2004 Face of FitSights Model Search Winner
