= Davana Medina =

American figure competitor

- Professional bodybuilder

Personal info
- Nickname: Funky cold Medina
- Born: January 28, 1974 (age 52); Ponce, Puerto Rico

Best statistics
- Height: 5 ft 7 in (1.70 m)
- Weight: (In Season): 128-130 lb (Off-Season):138-142 lb

Professional (Pro) career
- Pro-debut: NPC Figure National Champion; 2001
- Best win: IFBB Figure Olympia three times; 2001-2005
- Predecessor: None
- Successor: Jenny Lynn
- Active: since 2001

Davana Medina is a professional figure competitor from the United States. Medina is one of the more successful figure competitors in the history of the sport, winning the first three Figure Olympia titles from 2003 to 2005.

== Biography ==
Davana was born on January 28, 1974, in Ponce, Puerto Rico. She won her first figure competition, the NPC Bev Francis Atlantic States.

Davana turned professional after winning the first NPC Figure Nationals in 2001. However, there were no professional figure contests until 2003, so she was forced to take a year off from competition. She has been one of the more successful women in figure competition, winning the first three Figure Olympias. Davana competes at 5'7" and 130 pounds.

After missing the 2006 IFBB Figure Olympia, Medina retired from the sport. On July 14, 2010, it was confirmed that Davana would be making a comeback to the competitive stage as a bikini competitor at the IFBB Europa Hartford Bikini Championships. However, she later pulled out of the competition.

== Contest history ==
- 2001 NPC Bev Francis Atlantic States Figure Championships - 1st
- 2001 NPC National Figure Championships - 1st
- 2003 IFBB Figure International - 3rd
- 2003 IFBB Pittsburgh Pro Figure - 2nd
- 2003 IFBB Night of Champions Figure - 1st
- 2003 IFBB New York Pro Figure - 1st
- 2003 IFBB Figure Olympia - 1st
- 2004 IFBB New York Pro Figure - 1st
- 2004 IFBB Figure Olympia - 1st
- 2005 IFBB New York Pro Figure - 1st
- 2005 IFBB Charlotte Pro Figure - 1st
- 2005 IFBB Figure Olympia - 1st

== See also ==
- List of female fitness & figure competitors
