= Abbou =

Abbou is an Algerian surname, found in France as Abbou (from Hassaniya-Arabic ﻋﺒﻮ). Notable people with the surname include:

- Jelena Abbou (born 1977), American figure competitor
- Mohamed Abbou (Moroccan politician), born 1959
