= Zitouni =

Zitouni (Arabic: زيتوني) is a Maghrebian surname. Notable people with the surname include:

- Abdelghani Zitouni (1932–2010), Algerian football player
- Abdelkader Zitouni (born 1981), Tunisian football referee
- Ahmed Zitouni (1949–2024), Algerian writer
- Ali Zitouni (born 1981), Tunisian football player
- Boubaker Zitouni (born 1965), Tunisian football player
- Djamel Zitouni (1964–1996), leader of the Algerian Armed Islamic Group (terrorist group)
- Nassim Zitouni (born 1994), French-Algerian football player
- Malika Zitouni (born 1973), French-Algerian bodybuilder
- Mustapha Zitouni (1928–2014), French-Algerian football player
- Souad Zitouni (born 1974), French lawyer and politician
- Tayeb Zitouni (1956–2025), Algerian politician
