= Elaine Goodlad =

- Professional bodybuilder

Personal info
- Born: May 2, 1964 (age 62); Saskatchewan, Canada

Best statistics
- Height: 5 ft 7 in (1.70 m)
- Weight: (In Season) 130-132 lb (Off-Season) 138-140 lb

Professional (Pro) career
- Pro-debut: 2002 NPC Emerald Cup; 2002
- Best win: IFBB California Pro Figure Champion; 2004
- Predecessor: None
- Successor: Mary Elizabeth Lado
- Active: since 2002

Elaine Goodlad (born May 2, 1964) is a professional figure competitor and makeup artist. She is a makeup artist used by fitness models, photographers, and fitness & figure competitors for photo shoots and contest times.

== Biography ==
Elaine grew up in Saskatchewan, Canada in a small town and farming community to Baptist parents. When she was in high school she was involved in sports such as track and field and volleyball. At the age of twenty, Elaine discovered the gym, and used the structure and discipline of the weight training to overcome some of her personal issues and gain new confidence. She continued her weight training regime with the help of a powerlifter, Terry Goodlad who helped her to make the right changes in her regime and helped her improve her physique.

== Vital Stats ==
- Full Name: Elaine Goodlad
- Birthday: May 2
- Place of Birth: Saskatchewan, Canada
- Current state of Residence: Las Vegas
- Occupation: Figure competitor, personal trainer, fitness model, Professional make-up artist.
- Height: 5'7"
- Weight (In Season): 130-132 lbs. (Off-Season):138-140 lbs.
- Eye Color: Blue

== Bodybuilding philosophy ==
Goodlad's training consists of simple compound movements with mostly free weights (she uses only a few cable exercises and machine exercises). She typically weight trains 5 days a week, and in the off-season she focuses on her glutes, hamstrings, and shoulders as primary muscle groups. Goodlad usually trains two body parts per day on the off-season, and performs between one and two cardio sessions a day, 7 days a week (one with her weight training and another one at night).

== Contest History ==
- 2002 NPC Emerald Cup, 1st (Tall) and Overall winner
- 2003 IFBB Arnold Classic Figure International, 6th
- 2003 IFBB Jan Tana Pro Classic, 6th
- 2003 IFBB New York Pro Championships, 5th
- 2003 IFBB Night of Champions, 5th
- 2003 IFBB Figure Olympia, 11th
- 2003 IFBB Show of Strength Pro Championship, 6th
- 2003 IFBB Pittsburgh Pro Figure, 5th
- 2004 IFBB California Pro Figure, 1st
- 2004 IFBB Figure International, 8th
- 2004 IFBB Pittsburgh Pro Figure, 3rd
- 2004 IFBB Show of Strength Pro Championship, 8th
- 2004 IFBB Figure Olympia, 8th
- 2005 IFBB Figure International 8th
- 2005 IFBB Charlotte Pro Championships, 8th
- 2005 IFBB Europa Supershow, 6th
- 2006 IFBB Figure International 10th

== Magazine Reference ==
Stoddard, Grant. EG. California: Muscle and Fitness. March 2006 Edition. ISSN 0744-5105. (New York, NY: Weider Publications, LLC., a division of American Media Inc., 2006.). Section: Training and Fitness: pages 218-222 covers Goodlad's article.
