= Connie Garner =

- professional bodybuilder

Personal info
- Nickname: Pocket Rocket
- Born: 22 May 1979 (age 46); Canberra, Australia

Best statistics
- Height: 5 ft 2 in (1.57 m)
- Weight: In season: 105–110 lb Off-season: 120–130 lb

Professional (Pro) career
- Best win: 2000 Miss World Fitness Champion, NABBA 2001 Miss Fitness Australia Champion 2000 Miss Fitness Australia Champion; Best years: 2000 and 2001

Connie Garner (born 22 May 1979) is a fitness competitor and NABBA Miss World Fitness. She won the Miss World Fitness title in 2000.

== Biography ==
Garner was born to a Finnish mother and French Heritage father, and was raised in Canberra, Australia. She began jazz ballet dancing at 7 years old. She played water polo, netball, basketball, hockey and soccer throughout high school. She was introduced to the gym by her physical education teacher. Garner became a personal trainer and fitness instructor herself in 1993.

Her first competition was in sport aerobics in 1997, in which she won the state title. Garner then went on to compete in fitness competitions in the National Amateur Bodybuilders Association (NABBA)/World Fitness Federation (WFF) and Ms. Fitness federations. During her five years of competing, she won multiple State and Australian Miss Fitness titles, with her best win being Miss World Fitness in 2000. A World Fitness Championship Title.

Fitness success followed with media coverage. Garner appeared on the cover of For Him Magazine in 2002. She also appeared in popular magazines such as Cosmopolitan, Ms. Fitness Magazine, Australian Ironman, Australian MuscleMag, Women in Sport, and Oxygen Magazine. Her fitness career was followed by newspapers and local news.

Garner retired from fitness competitions in 2001 to focus on education, obtaining two degrees, a Masters and Bachelors of Information Systems, both from the University of Canberra, Australia.

Garner is also a working actress and model. She appears in the 2018 movie Australia Day, she also appeared in the 2014 movie San Andreas, and in the TV series' Hoges and Mako Mermaids Garner also stars in the following TV Commercials Youi 2018, Star Casino 2018, UBet, Cenovis Vitamins, Devine Homes, Vikings Heath and Fitness Centre, Body Connection. She works in cyber security. Garner authored a chapter on success in the book Real Talk Real Women, published in 2014.

== Contest history ==
- 2001 World Fitness Federation Universe - 2nd
- 2001 NABBA Miss Fitness Australia - 1st
- 2000 NABBA Miss World Fitness - 1st
- 2000 NABBA Miss Fitness Australia - 1st
- 1999 NABBA Miss Fitness Australia - 1st
- 1999 Ms. Fitness World - 16th
- 1999 NABBA Miss Fitness Australia - 2nd
- 1999 NABBA Miss Fitness State Titles - 1st
- 1998 NABBA Miss Fitness Australia - 2nd
- 1998 NABBA Miss Fitness State Titles - 1st
- 1997 NABBA Miss Fitness State Titles - 1st

== See also ==
- List of female fitness & figure competitors
- Finnish Australians
