= Mallory Haldeman =

American IFBB figure and fitness competitor

- Professional bodybuilder

Personal info
- Nickname: Mal, Mally
- Born: January 29, 1986 (age 40); Lancaster, Pennsylvania, U.S.

Best statistics
- Height: 5 ft 5 in (1.65 m)
- Weight: (In season) 125 lb (Off-season) 135 lb

Professional (Pro) career
- Pro-debut: IFBB PBW Tampa Pro; 2012
- Best win: IFBB Tahoe Pro Figure 2013 IFBB PBW Tampa Pro Figure; 2013
- Active: since 2011

Mallory Haldeman is an American IFBB professional figure and fitness competitor. She is also a fitness model, personal trainer and health and wellness coach.

She achieved status as a professional figure competitor with the IFBB in 2012 after winning the 2012 National Physique Committee Junior National Championships by winning 1st place in her Figure Class and being named overall winner of the Figure Competition.

Her highest achievements to date have been winning the 2013 IFBB Tahoe Pro Figure, 2013 IFBB PBW Tampa Pro Figure, 2012 NPC Junior National Championships and two top five finishes in the 2012 and 2013 Figure Olympia events. She also won the 2012 Rookie of the year honor given annually by Flex.

Haldeman is trained by IFBB professional Tracey Greenwood.

== Competitive philosophy ==
Haldeman stated in an article posted on Muscle Foods USA's website: "I found fitness more by circumstance than anything else. I had an injury (2009) that resulted in my inability to walk or run for quite some time. It was recommended to me that I try weight training during this time to keep in shape and help reduces my recovery time. At the time I had zero interest in lifting weights or making a daily trip to the gym. It didn’t take long, however, until I found that I loved what resistance training can do to your body. After only a few short weeks I was hooked and started to learn everything I could about sculpting and building my physique….and although a few years have passed since then I am just as excited learning about everything health and fitness related ! It is a life style that I have completely submerged myself in!"

== Competitions ==
She has participated in the following shows:

- 2014 IFBB California Governors Cup Pro - 6th
- 2013 Olympia Figure - 5th
- 2013 IFBB Tahoe Pro Figure - 1st
- 2013 IFBB PBW Tampa Pro Figure - 1st
- 2013 IFBB California Governors Cup Pro - 3rd
- 2013 Australia Pro Figure - 4th
- 2013 Arnold Figure International - 5th
- 2012 IFBB Olympia - 5th
- 2012 IFBB Tournament of Champions Pro Figure - 2nd
- 2012 IFBB PBW Tampa Pro - 2nd
- 2012 NPC Junior National Championships - 1st and Overall
- 2012 NPC Junior USA Championships - 3rd
- 2011 NPC USA Championships - 3rd
- 2011 NPC Team Universe & National Fitness Championships - 16th
- 2011 NPC Junior USA Championships - 4th
- 2011 NPC Pittsburgh Championships - 5th
- 2011 NPC NY Metropolitan - 2nd

== See also ==
- List of female fitness & figure competitors

== Media Coverage ==
- Mallory Haldeman wins 2012 US Junior Nationals
- The Great Athlete that is Mallory Haldeman
- Real Talk - Real Women Interview of Mallory Haldeman
- Hardbody Training - Legs like Mallory Haldeman
- "VBINews interview of Mallory Haldeman". VentureBeat.
- FemaleMuscle article - What Abs in Vegas
- Muscle & Fitness Hers
- Interview at the 2013 Arnold Expo
- Flex Magazine One on one Spotlight
- NPC Online coverage
- Bodybuilder Profile
- Figure Olympia Predictions
- 2014 Governors Cup
