= Sereny =

Sereny is a surname. Notable people with the surname include:

- Eva Sereny, Swiss photographer and film director
- Gitta Sereny (1921–2012), Austrian-British biographer, historian, and investigative journalist
- Krisztina Sereny (born 1976), Hungarian fitness competitor and porn actress
