= Vänskä =

Vänskä is a Finnish surname.

== Geographical distribution ==
As of 2014, 93.7% of all known bearers of the surname Vänskä were residents of Finland and 5.6% of Sweden.

In Finland, the frequency of the surname was higher than national average in the following regions:

1. North Karelia (1:378)
2. Kymenlaakso (1:2,670)
3. Päijänne Tavastia (1:3,249)
4. Southern Savonia (1:3,406)
5. Uusimaa (1:3,774)

== People ==
- Olli Vänskä, Finnish violinist
- Osmo Vänskä (born 1953), Finnish classical clarinetist, composer and conductor
- Sami Vänskä (born 1976), Finnish heavy metal bass guitarist
- Satu Vänskä (born 1979), Finnish classical violinist
