= Jean Titus =

Liberian-American fitness enthusiast and model

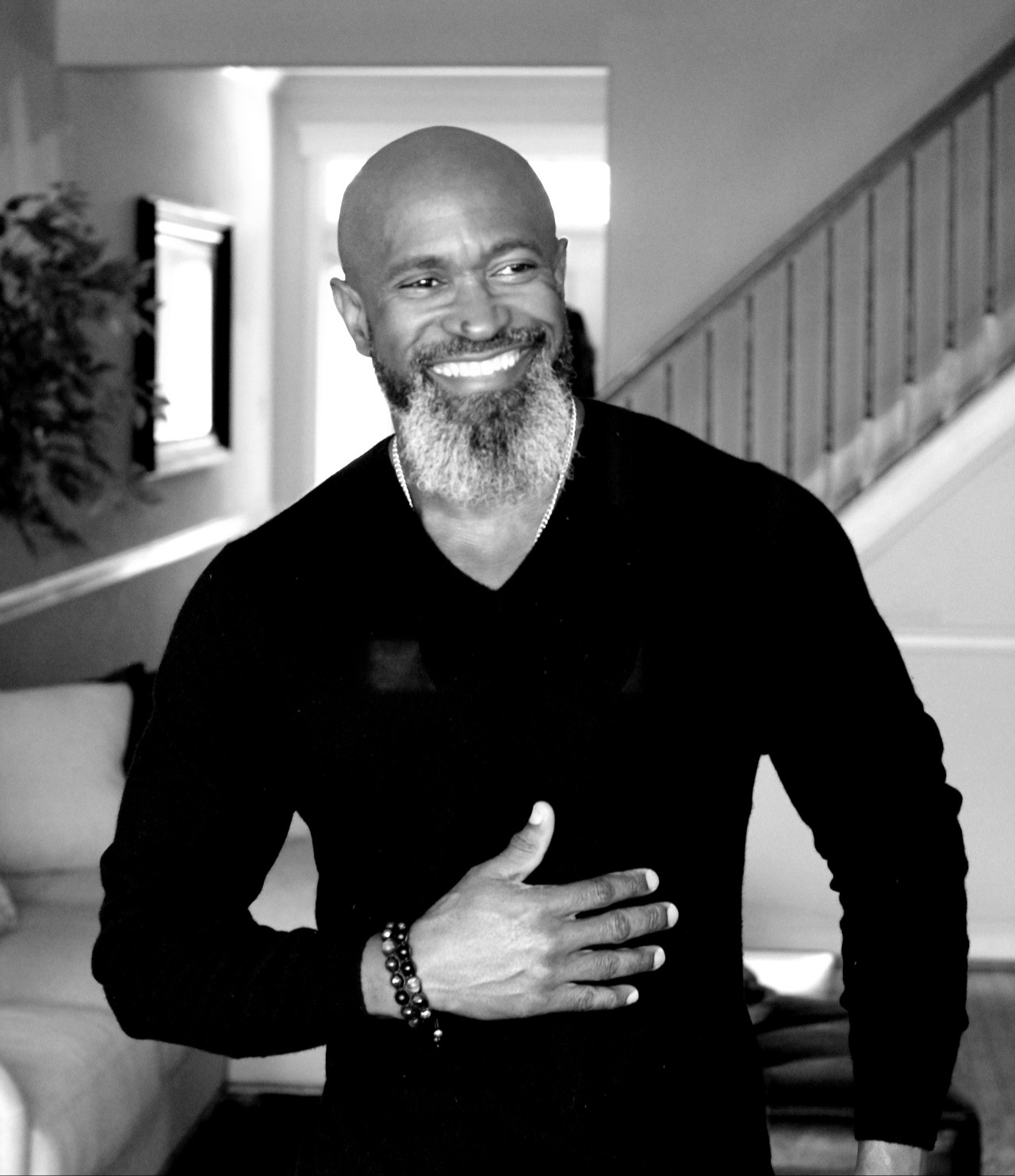
- Titus in 2018
- Born: June 30, 1971 (age 54); Liberia
- Modeling information
- Hair color: Black
- Eye color: Brown
- Website: unlockmyunlimited.com

Jean Titus (born June 30, 1971) also known as Titus Unlimited, is a fitness enthusiast and fashion model. He gained substantial recognition as an advisor, coach and trainer appearing in various fitness magazines and advertising campaigns, including features in Muscle & Fitness and Men's Health.

== Early life and education ==
Jean Titus, originally from Liberia, relocated to the United States in his early 20s. He has worked as a Wall Street financial advisor, real estate investor, and business owner. After his mother's death in 2002, he shifted his focus to advocating for health and wellness.

== Career ==
Jean Titus has been featured in a number of different publications and oftentimes participates as a guest speaker in fitness and wellness events.

Now Titus is one of the founding members of the Silverfox Squad and owner of Unlimited Supplements and dedicates his time to building his brand “TITUS UNLIMITED”.

His philosophy emphasizes consistency, discipline, mental resilience, mindfulness, meditation, and stress management.

== Early life and education ==
Jean Titus was born and raised in Liberia until he moved to the United States in his early 20s.
