= Amber Littlejohn =

American bodybuilder (born 1975)

- Professional bodybuilder

Personal info
- Nickname: Amber Alert, Coltish
- Born: July 6, 1975 (age 51); Monterey, California, U.S.

Best statistics
- Height: 5 ft 8 in (173 cm)
- Weight: (In Season): 130-135 lb (Off-Season):140-148 lb

Professional (Pro) career
- Pro-debut: IFBB Ms. International; 2004
- Best win: 2006 Ms. Figure Olympia Runner-up, 2006 IFBB Palm Beach Pro Figure Champion; 2006
- Predecessor: None
- Successor: Gina Aliotti
- Active: since 2001

Amber Littlejohn (born July 6, 1975) is an American bodybuilder. She was an IFBB professional figure competitor from the United States. Littlejohn placed in the top-five in almost every show after turning pro with an overall win at the 2003 NPC Figure Nationals.

== Early life ==
Littlejohn was raised by hippy parents who were passionate about education. Littlejohn grew up in a family of six children and was the second youngest and the only female of the group. Growing up in a rural cabin with few amenities, Littlejohn did not watch television until the age nine. She developed a deep interested in literature at a young age, becoming fond of authors such as Toni Morrison, Isabel Allende, Gabriel García Márquez, and Ernest Hemingway.

== Early career ==
In high school, Littlejohn participated in sports including track, martial arts and basketball. At the age of 23, she began weight training seriously to mend a broken heart and ended up falling in love with fitness. After training for several years and learning gymnastics at age 25, Littlejohn entered her first fitness competition, the NPC San Jose Fitness and Figure Championships in 2001, where she took first place in fitness and figure. Following her first victory, Littlejohn decided to compete solely in figure competitions.

== Competitive career ==
Littlejohn's highest professional competitive achievements were runner-up at the 2006 Ms. Figure Olympia and winning the 2006 inaugural IFBB Palm Beach Pro Figure Championships. After the 2006 Olympia, Littlejohn planned to retire from competing in figure to begin raising a family, but decided to compete at Figure Olympia in 2007 where she placed in sixth place.

== Contest History ==
- 2001 NPC San Jose Fitness and Figure Championships, 1st
- 2001 NPC San Francisco Fitness and Figure Championships, 1st
- 2002 NPC Emerald Cup, 1st (Tall)
- 2002 NPC Ironmaiden, 3rd (Tall)
- 2003 NPC Nationals, 1st (Tall) and Overall Winner
- 2004 IFBB California Pro Figure, 3rd
- 2004 IFBB Ms. International, 10th
- 2004 IFBB MS. Olympia, 5th
- 2004 IFBB Pittsburgh Pro Figure, 7th
- 2004 IFBB Show of Strength Pro Championship, 3rd
- 2005 IFBB California Pro Figure, 2nd
- 2005 IFBB Charlotte Pro Championships, 2nd
- 2005 IFBB Ms International, 6th
- 2005 IFBB Ms. Olympia, 4th
- 2006 IFBB Ms. Olympia, 2nd
- 2006 IFBB Palm Beach Pro Figure, 1st
- 2007 IFBB Ms. Olympia, 6th

== See also ==
- List of female fitness and figure competitors
