= Tammie Leady =

- professional bodybuilder

Personal info
- Born: August 11, 1969 (age 55); Port Arthur, Texas

Best statistics

Professional (Pro) career
- Pro-debut: 2001
- Best win: 2001 Team Universe National Champion; 2001
- Active: since 1996

Tammie Leady (born 11 August, Port Arthur, Texas) is a certified personal trainer and a fitness and figure competitor based in Atlanta, Georgia. She is also a fitness model who has appeared in a number of magazines, including Flex, American Curves and Muscle & Fitness. As a personal trainer, she writes in various columns about improving ones physical health and well-being.

In 1997, Leady relocated to Tampa, Florida, and began competing in fitness competitions, placing 20th in the 1997 Fitness America Nationals. In 1999, Atlanta Sports and Magazine named her the "Fittest Female in Atlanta" and in 2001, she earned her status as IFBB Pro fitness competitor by winning the Team Universe National Championships. In June, 2005, she finished in eighth place in the Toronto Pro Figure competition held in Niagara Falls, Ontario, Canada.

== Contest history ==
- 1996 Tampa Fitness America 5th
- 1997 ESPN 2 - Fitness America 3rd
- 1997 NPC Southern States Fitness 3rd
- 1997 NPC Jan Tana Classic 3rd
- 1997 LifeQuest Triple Crown Dance Invitational 3rd
- 1997 ESPN 2 - Fitness America 3rd
- 1997 Fitness America Nationals 20th (out 108)
- 1998 Georgia Eastern Seaboard Fitness Championships Overall Fitness Champion
- 1999 NPC Team Universe Fitness 5th Place
- 1999 Atlanta Sports & Fitness Magazine Fittest Female 1st
- 2000 Team Universe 4th
- 2000 USA Championships 19th
- 2000 NPC Nationals 6th
- 2001 Team Universe National Championships 1st /Pro Card
- 2002 NYC Pro Fitness 7th
- 2002 Pittsburgh Pro Fitness 13th
- 2003 GNC Figure Championships 10th
- 2004 GNC Pro Figure 20th
- 2005 Eastern Seaboard Pro Invitational 4th
- 2005 Toronto Pro Figure 8th Place
