= Debbie Dobbins =

Fitness competitor and model (1963–1993)

- Professional bodybuilder

Personal info
- Born: October 28, 1963; Olongapo, Philippines
- Died: December 30, 1993 (aged 30); Queens, New York

Best statistics
- Height: 5 ft 7 in (170 cm)
- Weight: (In Season) 125-127 lb (Off-Season)128-130 lb

Professional (Pro) career
- Pro-debut: Miss Fitness USA; 1993
- Best win: 1993 Miss Galaxy Fitness Runner-Up; 1993
- Active: Retired 1993

Debbie Dobbins (October 28, 1963 – December 30, 1993) was a popular fitness competitor and fitness model during the early 1990s. Her life was cut short due to smoke inhalation in a house fire.

== Biography ==
Dobbins was born in Olongapo, Philippines, of half Irish and half Filipino descent. When she was three her family moved to Portland, Oregon, where she grew up in the northwest side. She competed in a variety of sports in high school and college, including track and field and basketball. She graduated from college with a degree in Marketing and Advertising. After college, she began taking aerobic classes, and also took up running and weight training. Later she taught aerobics and cross training for seven years, and gradually made weight training a bigger part of her fitness regimen.

Dobbins moved to Los Angeles, California at age twenty-four to pursue a career in the fitness industry. There she became an aerobics instructor and played volleyball for Orange Coast College in Costa Mesa. While establishing herself as a fitness model she worked full-time for a leasing company, and did promotional work for Randy Pfund, coach of the Los Angeles Lakers. Debbie also worked as a cheerleader for the Portland Breakers of the USFL and Los Angeles Raiders of the NFL.

Her magazine cover appearances included Musclemag International and Iron Man. She was also featured in Iron Man's special swimsuit issue and modeled for Iron Man gym wear. In 1993, Debbie placed third in the Ms. Fitness USA competition and tied for second at the Ms. Galaxy. Her death in late 1993 occurred as a result of smoke inhalation in a house fire.

In a 1994 episode of Hard Copy, it was speculated that there was foulplay involved with the fire causing her death.

== Stats ==
- Height: 5'7"
- Weight: 120-128 pounds

== Contest history ==
- 1993 Miss Fitness USA - 3rd Runner-up
- 1993 Miss Fitness USA - 2nd Runner-up
- 1993 Miss Galaxy Fitness - 1st Runner-up

== Magazine covers ==
- November 1993 - Musclemag International
- February 1994 - Iron Man
- March 1994 - Musclemag International
- July 1994 - Muscular Development
