= Alexis Ellis =

American fitness and figure competitor

- Professional bodybuilder

Personal info
- Born: New York City, New York, U.S.

Best statistics

Professional (Pro) career
- Pro-debut: IFBB Colorado Pro Figure; 2006
- Best win: 2005 NPC Ironman Pro Invitational Figure Extravaganza Overall Champion; 2003-2005
- Active: Since 2003

Alexis Ellis is an IFBB professional fitness and figure competitor.

Alexis Ellis was born in New York City. She participated in activities such as dancing and ballet before she became involved in fitness competition. Upon graduating from Columbia University with a B.S. in Biological Science, she went to live in Southern California. It was in Southern California where Alexis began her fitness career, when she competed in the NPC Orange County Classic, and placed third. She has since won two competitions in the tall class, which are the NPC Los Angeles Figure Competition of 2003 and the NPC Ironman Pro Invitational Figure Extravaganza of 2005.

== Stats ==
- Height 5'8"
- Biceps 12"
- Chest 38D
- Waist 24"
- Hips 38"
- Quads 24"
- Calves 16"
- Off-season weight 145 lbs
- Competition weight 135 lbs

== Competitive history ==
- 2003 NPC Orange County Classic Competition, 3rd
- 2003 NPC Los Angeles Figure Competition, 1st and Overall
- 2004 NPC Ironman Pro Invitational Figure Extravaganza, 3rd
- 2004 NPC Figure Nationals, 5th
- 2005 NPC Ironman Pro Invitational Figure Extravaganza, 1st and Overall
- 2005 NPC Jr Nationals, 4th
- 2005 NPC USA Figure Championships, 6th
- 2005 NPC Figure Nationals, 2nd (Qualified for IFBB Professional Status)
- 2006 IFBB Colorado Pro Figure, 18th place
- 2006 IFBB California Pro Figure, 18th place
