= Sanna Jalomäki =

- Born: Sanna
- Other names: S.L. Jalovuori
- Education: Sarah Redfern High School, Sydney, Australia; MA, University of Tampere, Finland; The Transmission Project, London
- Occupations: Singer, songwriter, painter, actress, art educator, graphic designer, author
- Years active: 2004–present
- Known for: Kimppakuvitus technique, Urban Lace street art, fantasy book Kurre ja Murre
- Notable work: Kurre ja Murre – Valkoonimaan tarinoita (2025); Community art project for SRV and City of Kirkkonummi (2019)

Multidisciplinary artist Sanna is a Finnish-Australian singer, songwriter, painter, formally trained actress, art educator, graphic designer and author.

She studied at Tampere University of Technology in Finland, then worked as a professional actress appearing on national and international television (e.g. Taikapeili TV2, Pimeän Hehku TV2). From November 2008 to January 2011 she lived in Athens, where she started painting, specializing in portraiture. Her subject matter focuses on people and their environments and she has exhibited in Greece, Finland and Japan.

Using her collaborative technique Kimppakuvitus, she and her team facilitated Finland's largest inclusive community art project of a freestyle diptych painting created in one day by 1 100 participants for construction company SRV and the City of Kirkkonummi, Jokirinne School (2019). Sanna has also been creating street art with her unique Urban Lace -style since 2024.

Under the pseudonym S.L. Jalovuori (with 11- year old Lumi Vuorela) her debut fantasy-adventure book Kurre ja Murre - Valkoonimaan tarinoita was published in 2025. She also illustrated the book.

Since 2011 she has lived in Finland where she continues to work in the arts and as an adult educator.

== Education ==
- Sarah Redfern High School, Sydney, Australia
- MA, University of Tampere, Finland
- The Transmission Project (European Union sponsored pilot programme), London, England

== Music ==
Singer/songwriter for alternative pop band Saint Sibar 2013-

Songwriter and lead singer in rock band 'mute8', Helsinki, Finland 2004-2008.

== Exhibitions ==
- Selected solo exhibitions
  - A Series of Paintings 2009-2010 at The Finnish Institute at Athens 22.2 - 6.3.2010 as part of the 25th anniversary of the institute, Athens, Greece
  - MOZart Café Gallery 10 - 23.11.2010, Nea Kifissia, Athens, Greece
  - Arkadia 16.6 - 7.7.2011, Helsinki, Finland
  - Rytmi 3.10-3.12.2011, Helsinki, Finland
  - S-ikkunagalleria, Sokos Department store, Helsinki, Finland 3.9-14.10.2012
  - TOHONO, Gallery and Design store, Helsinki, Finland 11.12.2012-3.1.2013
  - Kirjasto 10 exhibition space, Postitalo, Helsinki, Finland 22.4-5.5.2013
  - Gallery Kalleria, Helsinki, Finland 10.-16.7.2017
- Selected group and joint exhibitions
  - with TRKCrew collective at Helsinki Underground Art Weekend Festival (HUA) Kaapelitehdas 11.–13.5.2012
  - joint exhibition Eco-Art Exhibition Blobs 'n' Scraps at Gallery Kalleria, Helsinki, 19.7-2.8.2012
  - with TRKCrew collective at Artwheels, Night of the Arts, Helsinki, Finland 8.2012
  - with TRKCrew collective at Valon juhla, Torikorttelit, Kiseleff Building, Helsinki, Finland 10.2012
  - with TRKCrew collective at Rytmi, Helsinki, Finland 8.4-18.5.2013
  - SA-LA-YU-JU collaborative exihibition, Shimane Art Museum, Japan 30.7.-4.8.2014, incl. live-webcam connection to Kirjasto 10 in Helsinki, Finland
  - exhibition of collaborative piece Lukuhetki at Central Library Oodi, Helsinki, Finland 30.4.-6.5.2023
  - collaborative Freedom mural for The Orange Company in Helsinki, Finland January 2022

== Charity and other projects ==
- - Concert project manager for Rock Against Child Abuse, (RACP Finland) as well as a member of the International RACP core team. RACP Finland charity concert 19.1.2008 Nosturi, Helsinki, Finland
  - Founder of PIRJO & PURJO PRODUCTIONS (PPP-Art ry) with designer Sinivuokko Koivula, 2012 onwards.
  - Youth art project Watts On the Wall (W.O.W 2012 & 2013) - funded by the Ministry of Education and Culture of Finland with the Minister of Sports and Culture Paavo Arhinmäki as the project's official guardian.
  - founder of 5 member art collective TRKCrew
