= Chisato Mishima =

Japanese fitness competitor

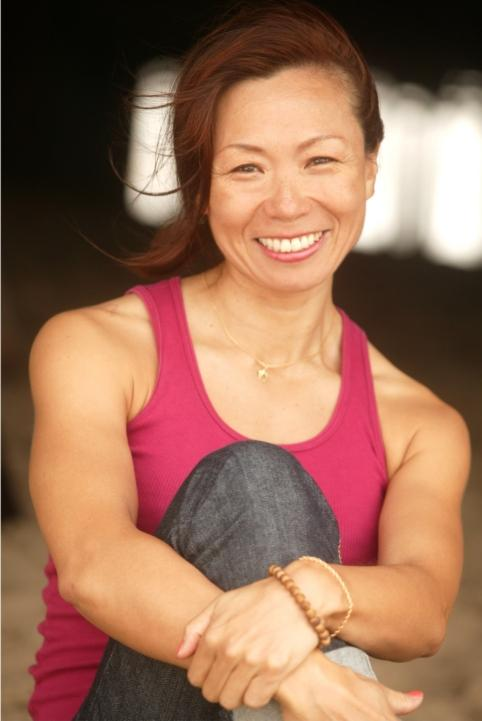

Personal information
- Native name: 三島千里 (Mishima Chisato)
- Nationality: Japan
- Born: November 17, 1967 (age 58) Nagoya, Japan
- Occupations: yoga instructor, fitness coach

Sport
- Country: Japan
- Sport: bodybuilding, fitness
- Rank: 17
- Event: 1998: Fitness Olympia 98

Achievements and titles
- World finals: 47, Women's Fitness Professional Ranking 1998

Chisato Mishima (三島千里 (Mishima Chisato)) is a retired professional fitness competitor from Japan. To date she is the only fitness competitor from Japan to qualify and compete in both the Ms. Fitness Olympia and Ms. Fitness IFSB competitions. She lives and teaches yoga and coaches fitness in Japan.

== Biography ==
Chisato Mishima was born on November 17, 1967, in Nagoya, Japan She was a Japan national gymnastics champion during high school. After graduating from University she worked as a fitness coach for several professional baseball teams. She won the All Japan Aerobics competition in 1994 and 1995. Mishima moved to England in 1995 to train and compete in Europe. She won the British Championships in 1997.

== Other notes ==
- Mishima is a Jōdō Instructor at the Kaori-jiku Kobudo Dojo in Osaka, Japan.
