= Mary Elizabeth Lado =

American figure competitor (born 1978)

- Professional bodybuilder
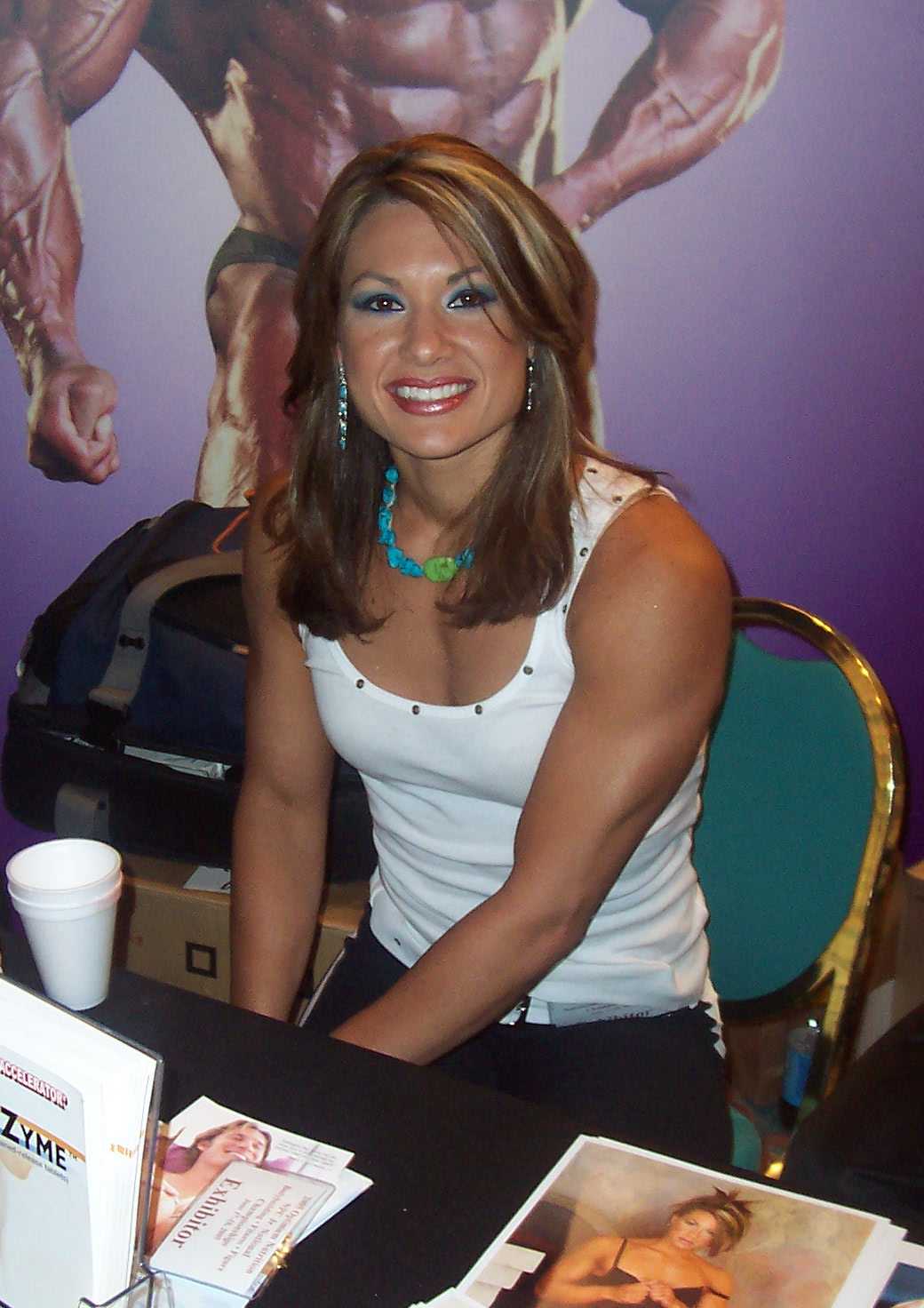
- Mary Elizabeth Lado in 2005

Personal info
- Nickname: Queen Mary
- Born: September 16, 1978 (age 47); New Orleans, Louisiana, United States

Best statistics
- Height: 5 ft 7 in (1.70 m)
- Weight: (In Season) 128-130 lb (Off-Season) 138-142 lb

Professional (Pro) career
- Pro-debut: IFBB Figure International; 2005
- Best win: IFBB Figure International Champion, 2 times; 2005-2007
- Predecessor: Jenny Lynn
- Successor: TBA
- Active: Since 2003

Mary Elizabeth Lado (born September 16, 1978) is a figure competitor from the United States. Mary quickly moved up the amateur ranks in 2003 and soon became a professional figure competitor in 2004 by winning NPC National Figure Championships. Today Lado is one of the top figure competitors in the Industry, winning the Ms. Figure International on two consecutive occasions and placing in the top-five at the Ms. Figure Olympia on two occasions.

== Biography ==
Mary Lado was born in New Orleans, Louisiana. Lado was raised amid Spanish culture; her mother, Marianela, was born in Cuba and her father, Jose, in Spain. The oldest of three, Mary along with her two brothers, Jose and Carlos were raised to be active, well-mannered individuals, who go after their dreams and work hard to achieve them. She still lives at her home state of Louisiana near her friends in a close-knit family. At an early age her parents encouraged her daughter to get involved in sports. Even as a child Lado was a naturally competitive child in different fields such as sports. In high school, Lado was on the volleyball, basketball, softball and track teams. This competitive fire helped her in her education; excelling in volleyball and softball, she received a full four-year scholarship to attend Chipola Junior College in Marianna, Florida as a pitcher, and then to Georgia Southwestern State University to play Softball. There she majored in sociology, and while she treasured her education, she felt uncomfortable studying and having to do homework was not a very enjoyable activity for her during her college years.

After graduation Lado felt that she needed something to do in order to deal with her competitive energy since school was over and she had no sports nor people to play sports with. She toyed with free weights to stay active when she was encouraged by relatives in the gym to compete in figure competitions. In 2003, after six months of hard training, she entered her first NPC figure contest, the New Orleans Figure Championships, and won her height class. In 2004, she came in second in the NPC Junior Nationals in her height class and won the figure overall title at the Nationals, catapulting her into the pros. In 2005, Lado entered five pro figure contests, winning the Pittsburgh Pro Figure Championships and the California Pro Figure Championships. Everything was going well at the professional level for Lado, but soon she would find herself with some personal issues that began to take their toll on her competitive career. While visiting family in Spain her hometown was hit by Hurricane Katrina. Unable to communicate with her family members in Louisiana for more than a week after her the disaster, Mary was in serious emotional turmoil and for some time thought of not attending the 2005 Ms. Figure Olympia contest (her first Olympia). She decided to attend the Olympia after being able to talk to her family in Louisiana.

Unable to find adequate gyms in Spain, Lado only relied on Theraband exercise and outdoor cardio sessions to prepare for the Olympia contest. After returning to Louisiana, she stayed with some friends and continued her last few preparations for the contest. While she was not in her best condition, she managed to place 4th at the Sacramento Pro Figure, and 5th Figure Olympia, which were her last two competitions of 2005. During this time Lado asked some of the judges and professional figure competitors about what she needed to do to improve her performance on stage as well as other areas that she needed work on in order to be more competitive at the pro level. She was told that she needed more stage presence and needed to work at her conditioning. Mary put her newfound knowledge to work and began her preparations for the 2006 Arnold Classic, where she placed 1st. Her crowning achievement to date came at the Arnold Fitness Weekend, in which she became the only athlete besides Jenny Lynn to hold the Figure International title. In total Lado has won the title twice.

== Vital stats ==
- Full Name: Mary Elizabeth Lado
- Birthday: September 16
- Place of Birth: New Orleans
- Current state of Residence: New Orleans
- Occupation: Figure competitor, personal trainer, and fitness model.
- Height: 5'7"
- Weight (In Season): 128-130 lbs. (Off-Season):138-142 lbs.
- Marital Status: Married
- Eye Color: Brown
- Hair Color: Light Brown
- Measurements: 36-28-36
- Size: 4
- Shoe: 10.5

== Bodybuilding philosophy ==
Lado's training consists of weight training 6 days a week in the off-season (usually two to three body parts per day off-season, and only one body part per day on-season). She uses a variation of compound and isolation movements (with free weights, machines and cables) in her training, focusing on her hamstrings, back, and shoulders. Mary uses between 9 sets for small body parts and up to 16 sets per large body part. She will train her legs early in the week when she is fresh and trains hamstrings twice a week. For cardio Mary uses the StepMill, Elliptical machine and the incline treadmill as her main tools. She does one to two sessions of cardio six days a week in the off-season and three sessions in the on-season.

== Competition history ==
- 2003 NPC New Orleans Championships, 1st (Tall)
- 2003 NPC Louisiana State Figure Championships, 2nd (Tall Class)
- 2003 NPC New Orleans Figure Championships, 1st (Tall Class)
- 2003 NPC Greater Gulf States Figure Championships, 1st (Tall Class) and Overall
- 2004 NPC Junior National Figure Championships, 2nd (Class D)
- 2004 NPC National Figure Championships, 1st (Tall Class) and Overall
- 2005 IFBB Figure International, 3rd
- 2005 IFBB Pittsburgh Pro Figure, 1st (Tall Class) and Overall
- 2005 IFBB California Pro Figure, 1st (Tall Class) and Overall
- 2005 IFBB Sacramento Pro Figure, 4th
- 2005 IFBB Figure Olympia, 5th
- 2006 IFBB Figure International, 1st
- 2006 IFBB Figure Olympia, 5th
- 2007 IFBB Figure International, 1st
- 2007 IFBB Figure Olympia, 10th
- 2008 IFBB Jacksonville Pro-Figure, 1st

== Magazine references ==
- CSCS, MS, Peña, Jimmy. Queen Mary from unknown Newcomer To The Sport's New Force, Figure International Champ Mary Lado Shares Her Unbelievable Quads Routine. California: Muscle and Fitness. September 2006 Edition. ISSN 0744-5105. (New York, NY: Weider Publications, LLC., a division of American Media Inc., 2006.). Section: Training and Fitness: 224-226, 228, 230, 231 covers Lado's article.
