= Marietta Žigalová =

Slovak fitness competitor (born 1968)

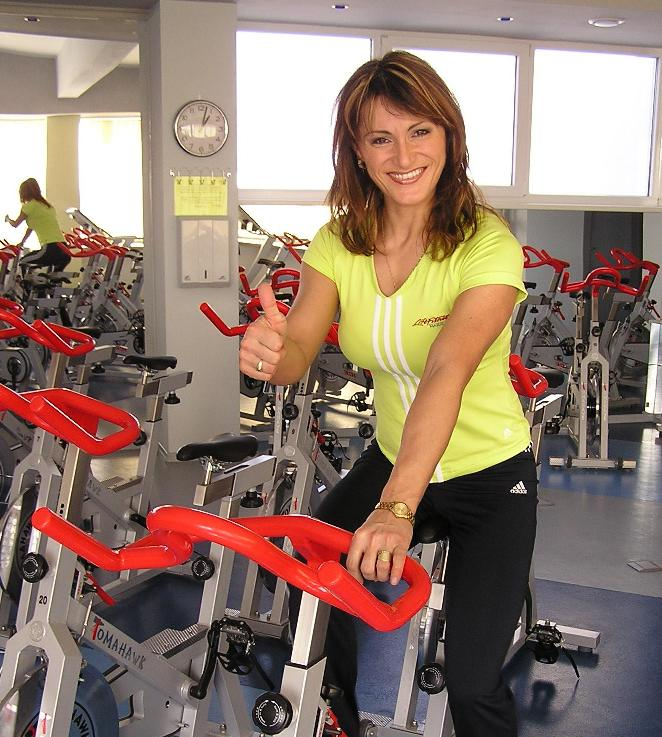
Marietta Žigalová

Marietta Žigalová (born 23 November 1968, in Ružomberok) is a former professional Slovak female fitness competitor. She was the Absolute World and Europe Fitness Champion and the Fitness Olympia competitor.
