= Jodi Leigh Miller =

American bodybuilder

- professional bodybuilder
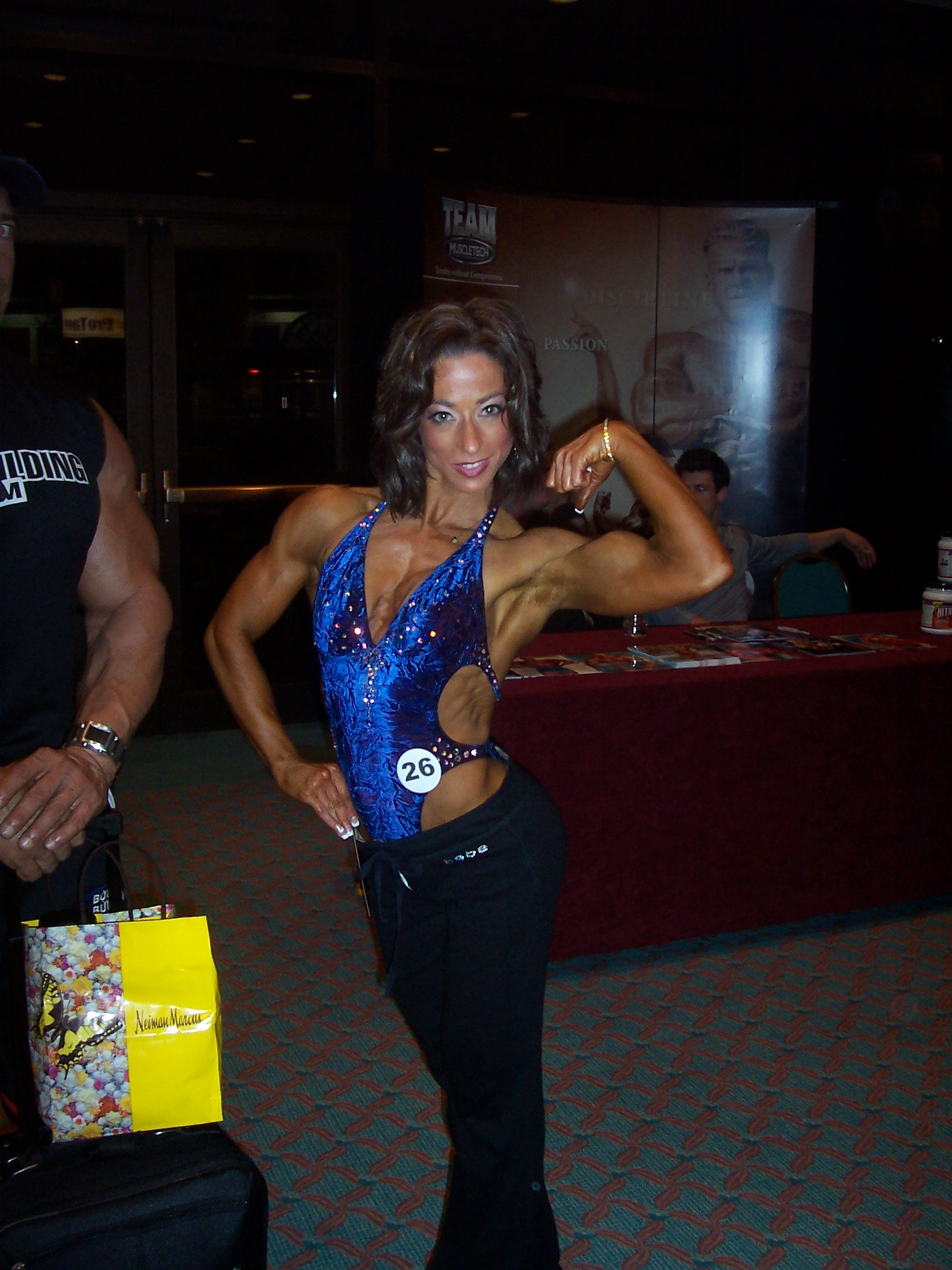
- Jodi Leigh Miller in 2005

Personal info
- Born: November 8, 1972 (age 52); Chicago, Illinois U.S.

Best statistics

Professional (Pro) career
- Pro-debut: 2006 Europa Supershow amateur bodybuilding (LW) Champion
- Best win: 2007 NPC Team Universe (bodybuilding) - 1st (LW)
- Active: since 1995

Jodi Leigh Miller is an American female bodybuilder and figure competitor.

== Biography ==
Miller, a bodybuilder and figure competitor, was born in Chicago, Illinois on November 8, 1972, and currently resides in Dallas, Texas. She graduated from the University of Texas at Austin with a BA in English and a Secondary Teaching Certification, and earned certification as a personal trainer from the Cooper Institute in Dallas. In the mid-1990s, her interest in powerlifting led her to try her hand in competition. She won first place in her first two powerlifting appearances, and began to consider competing in other fields. She is also an accomplished kickboxer. By the early 2000s she had been successful in sporting challenges and turned to bodybuilding, along with fitness and figure competition.

In 2001, Miller began competing in events for the NPC, an affiliate of the IFBB and the largest amateur bodybuilding organization in the United States. She won her division and the overall champion title in her first event, and since then has gradually gained repute on the national level. Miller actively markets herself through the Internet, and has attracted sponsorship from several national sporting equipment and apparel companies. She has also written as a guest columnist for Oxygen magazine. Miller is a former public school teacher as well.

In 2006, Miller transitioned back to bodybuilding. She won the lightweight class in the amateur bodybuilding division of the Europa Supershow. That qualified her to compete in the bodybuilding Nationals, where she placed eighth in the lightweight class.

Miller's transition into bodybuilding has been a successful one. She won the lightweight division of the 2007 Team Universe, the only drug-tested NPC event at the national level. This qualified her for the IFBB Women's Amateur Bodybuilding World Championships, held in Santa Susana, Spain, on September 21. She placed 13th in a field of 16 women in the <55 kg category.

== Contest history ==
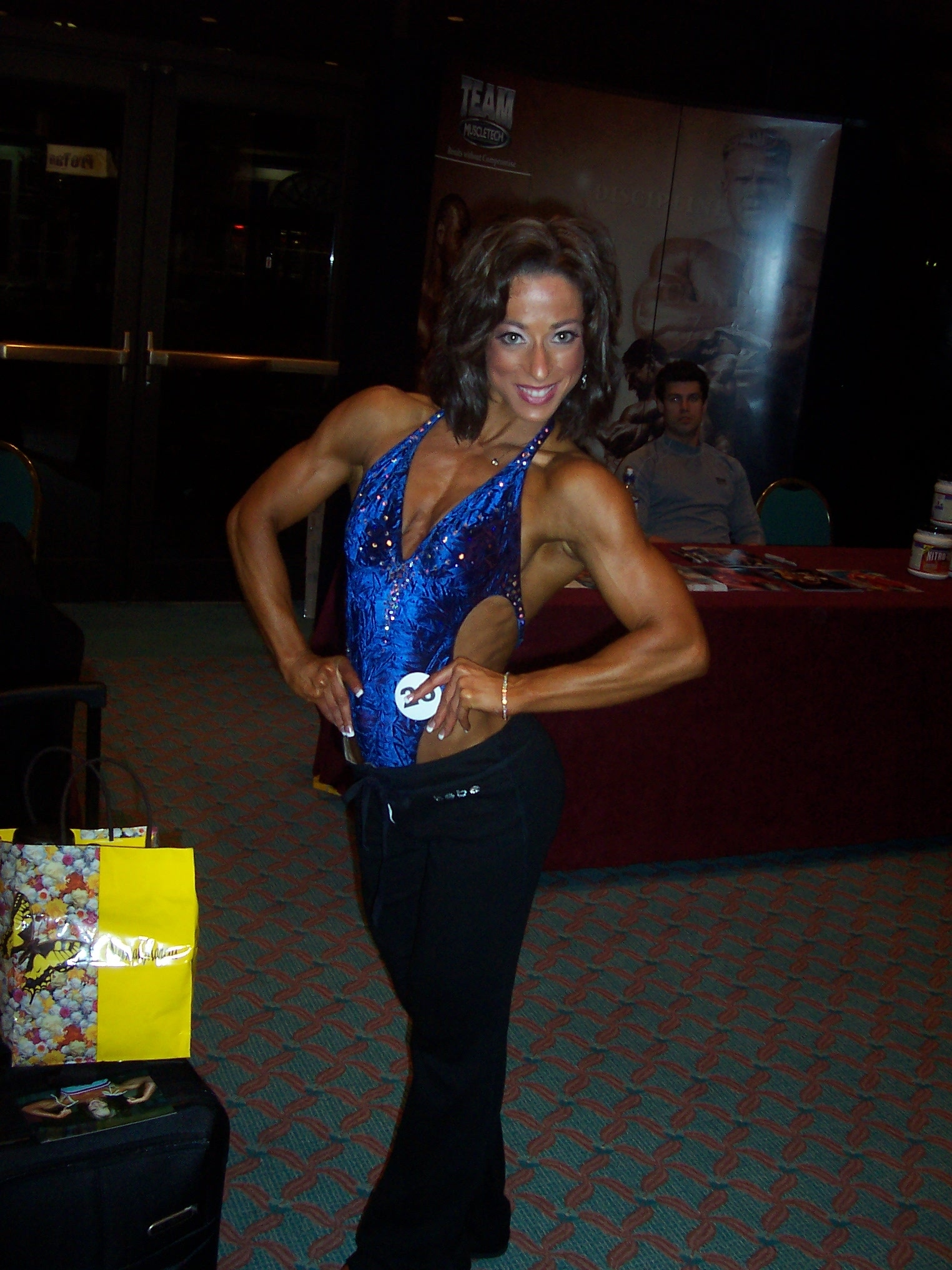

=== Powerlifting ===
- 1996 USA Powerlifting Federation Texas State Championships - 1st (111 lb. weight class)
- 1996 ADFPA Powerlifting Federation Longhorn Open - 1st (104 lb. weight class)

=== 24-Hour Fitness Gyms Triathlon Fitness Challenge ===
- 1998 Club Level, Texas - 1st
- 1998 Regional Level, Texas - 1st
- 1998 National Level - 4th

=== Galaxy Nova Federation ===
- 2000 Texas Grand Prix - 12th (physique round)
- 2001 Nationals - 15th (physique round)
- 2001 Nova USA Championships - 12th (physique round)

=== NPC ===
- 2001 NPC Texas State Championships - 1st-Overall Champion (novice lightweight bodybuilding division), 4th (figure division)
- 2001 NPC Heart of Texas - 2nd (open bodybuilding division), 3rd (figure division)
- 2002 NPC Lone Star Classic - 4th (short figure division)
- 2002 NPC Junior Nationals - 17th (short figure division)
- 2002 NPC Team Universe Figure Nationals - 19th-tie (short figure division)
- 2003 NPC Junior USA's - 7th (5'2" and under division)
- 2003 NPC Pittsburgh - 4th (short figure division)
- 2003 NPC Junior Nationals - 6th (short figure division)
- 2003 NPC Team Universe Figure Nationals - 5th (5'2" and under division)
- 2004 NPC Junior USA's - 5th (5'2" and under Figure Division)
- 2004 NPC Emerald Cup - 2nd (5'3" and under Figure Division)
- 2004 NPC Junior Nationals - 12th (5'2" and under Figure Division)
- 2005 NPC Junior Nationals - 11th (5'2" and under Figure Division)
- 2005 NPC USA's - 4th (5'2" and under Figure Division)
- 2006 NPC Team Universe/Figure Nationals - 10th (5'2" and under Figure Division)
- 2006 NPC USA's - 12th (5'2" and under Figure Division)
- 2006 NPC Europa Supershow amateur bodybuilding - 1st (LW)
- 2006 NPC Nationals (bodybuilding) - 8th (LW)
- 2007 NPC Team Universe (bodybuilding) - 1st (LW)
- 2007 IFBB Amateur World Championships (bodybuilding) - 13th (<55 kg)
