= Jennifer Nicole Lee =

American fitness model

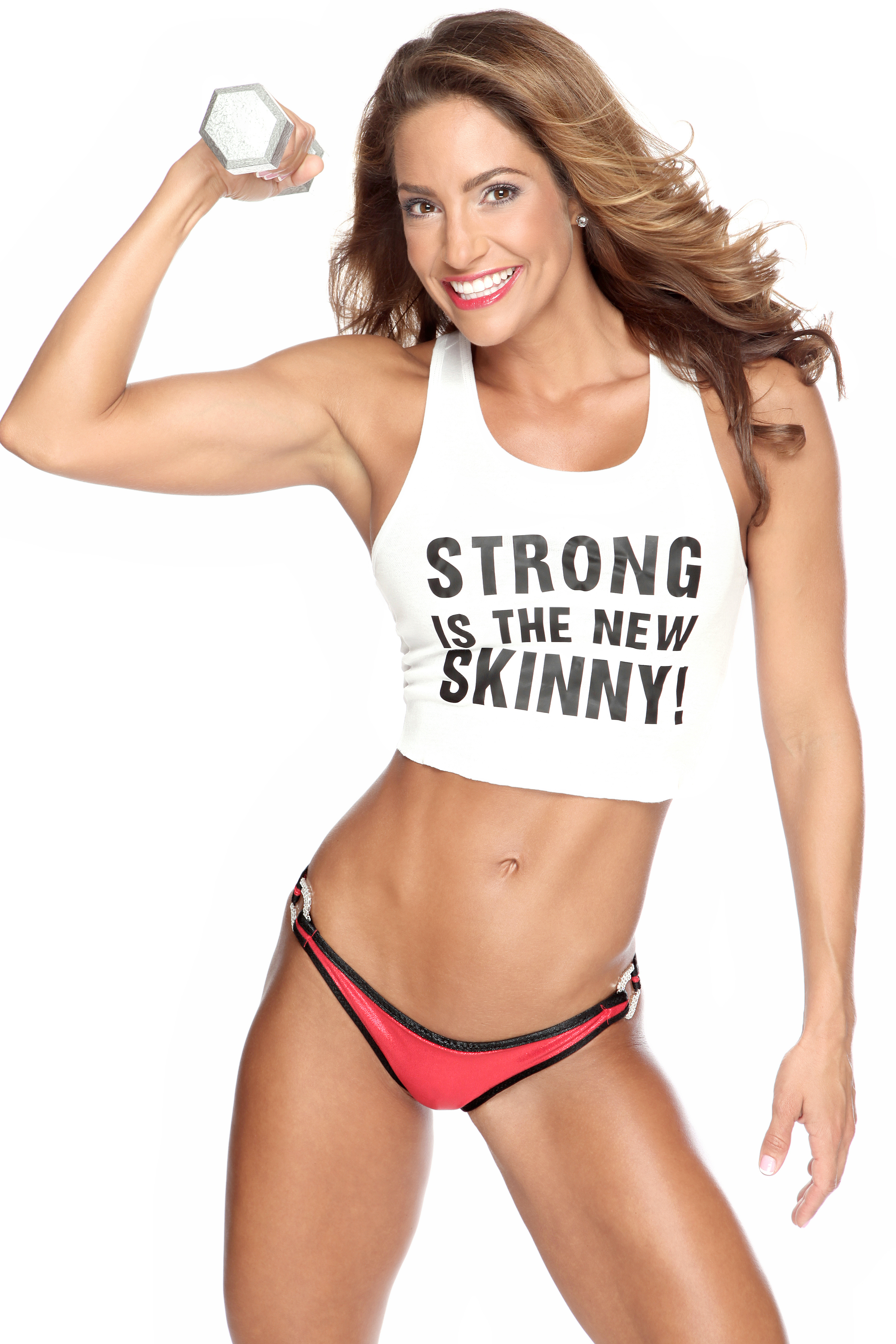
- Born: Jennifer Nicole Siciliano; June 13, 1975 (age 51); Rochester, New York, U.S.
- Occupations: Television personality, author, fitness celebrity
- Years active: 1996–present
- Spouse: Edward Lee (1997-2014)
- Children: 2
- Modeling information
- Height: 1.77 m (5 ft 9 1/2 in)
- Website: jennifernicolelee.com

Jennifer Nicole Lee (born Jennifer Nicole Siciliano on June 13, 1975) is an American fitness model, motivational speaker, and author. She is known for losing 70 pounds and launching a career as a fitness guru after bearing two children.

== Early life and education ==
Jennifer Nicole Siciliano was born in Rochester, New York, to Italian immigrants; the family later moved to Tennessee. She earned a bachelor's degree in international relations from the University of Tennessee at Knoxville.

== Career ==
Lee describes herself as having "no athletic background whatsoever," and says she has struggled with her weight her entire life. She weighed 170 pounds when she married, and continued to gain weight during both of her pregnancies, eventually reaching 200 pounds after the birth of her second child. Lee lost 70 pounds, was crowned "Miss Bikini America" in 1996, and launched a career as a "fitness guru". JNL, Inc. (now JNL, Inc. Worldwide) was founded in January 2004. Her books have been published both electronically and in print. She also launched a line of swimwear.

Lee has two clothing lines. The Jennifer Nicole Lee Collection through Rogiani is designed by Elisabetta Rogiani for fitness model photo shoots. Lee's own line is called the JNL Clothing Line, which includes gym and streetwear.

In March 2011, Lee opened the Fitness Model Factory in Miami, Florida, a production studio containing photography and videography studios, hair and makeup styling, and coaching for fitness models.

Lee is the creator of a fitness program called JNL Fusion, which emphasizes "super spiking," or the introduction of cardio between weight training exercises. Lee states that JNL Fusion is designed after her own workout routine: 4 training sessions of 45 minutes each per week. The workout method is targeted at women. JNL Fusion is a home exercise system and DVD set. It requires several small pieces of equipment. JNL Fusion has a certification program for personal trainers. Lee recruits and educates the trainers. She also holds an annual wellness retreat called the JNL Fusion World Conference & Fitness Revival.

She has appeared on "Inside Edition", "Oprah", "The Early Show," "E! Entertainment," "Fox and Friends," and "Extra." Lee appeared in the 2013 film Pain & Gain. As of 2012, Lee has appeared on 44 magazine covers, including three appearances on the cover of Oxygen magazine. She is also the subject of a calendar titled "The Jennifer Nicole Lee Body Paint Calendar."

== Published work ==
Lee stars in the "Fabulously Fit Moms" fitness DVD series. The series started in 2007 with "The New Mom Workout", "Total Body Workout", "Lower Body Burn" and "Super Energized Workout." Two more titles were released in 2008, "Upper Body Blast" and "Sleek and Sexy Workout".

Her first book to be published in print was The Mind, Body & Soul Diet: Your Complete Transformational Guide to Health, Healing Happiness, released on January 1, 2010. Jennifer Nicole Lee's second hard copy published book is entitled "The Jennifer Nicole Lee Fitness Model Diet: JNL's Super Fitness Model Secrets to a Sexy, Strong, Sleek Physique". In addition to her published cookbooks, Lee has her own online cooking show called "Fun Fit Foodie." She also has a published cookbook called "The Jennifer Nicole Lee Fun Fit Foodie Cookbook."

== Honors and awards ==
Lee was named Muscle & Fitness Magazine's 2006 Ms. Muscle and Fitness, a title she shared with Alicia Marie. Lee is a brand ambassador for nutritional supplement company Bio-Engineered Supplements and Nutrition (BSN). In 2011, Lee was mentioned as one of the "Top Three Females in the Fitness Industry" on Yahoo Sports. Lee was also named one of Splash Online's "Best Celebrity Bikini Babes of 2011." In 2012, CBS News named Lee as "America's Sexiest Fitness Mom."

== Personal life ==
Lee lives in Miami, Florida, with her sons, Jaden and Dylan. She and former husband, Edward Lee, divorced in 2014.
