= Finnish Australians =

Finnish Australians Australiansuomalaiset
Total population
- 7,939 (by birth, 2011 Census); 22,420 (by ancestry, 2011 census)

Regions with significant populations
- Sydney, Melbourne, Brisbane, Adelaide, Mount Isa

Languages
- Australian English · Finnish

Religion
- Lutheranism, irreligion

Related ethnic groups
- Finnish New Zealanders, Danish Australians, Estonian Australians, Norwegian Australians, Swedish Australians

Finnish Australians (Finnish: Australiansuomalaiset) are Australian citizens of Finnish ancestry or Finland-born people who reside in Australia. According to Finnish estimates, there are approximately 30,000 Australians of Finnish ancestry, and about 7,500 Finland-born Finns residing in Australia.

== History ==
The first person from Finland to arrive in Australia was Herman Spöring Jr. from Turku, who was part of the first voyage of James Cook that landed on the continent in 1770. The first Finns to migrate permanently were joining the Victorian gold rush in the 1850s. More migration followed in the following decades to Queensland. In 1899, Matti Kurikka tried to establish a utopian community in Chillagoe with about a 100 Finns, though the experiment failed within a year.

Many Finnish immigrants began arriving in Australia between 1947 and 1971. When these new immigrants came to Australia, they were taken to migrant camps. Once in the camp, they were given free room and board until the head of the family was assigned his first job. The largest and best-known of these camps was Bonegilla, a former military camp in northern Victoria. Most of these Finns, along with more than 300,000 immigrants from other countries, began their new lives in Bonegilla during this period.

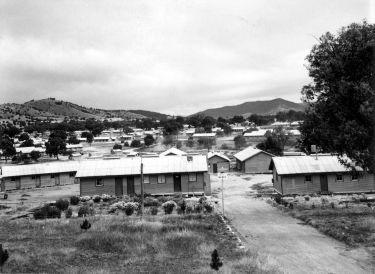
A migrant camp located in Bonegilla, Victoria in 1954. Groups of immigrants were housed there until they were destined for a job and a place to settle with their families.

The first group of Finnish immigrants who arrived in Australia came to work in the gold mines of Victoria in the 1850s. Years later, after the first significant wave of Finnish immigration in the 1920s, a second major wave of immigrants from the Nordic country takes place again, this being more numerous than the first one. Finns were usually hired to perform heavy physical labour. Despite this, they were particularly attracted by the income from the sugar cane fields and mining in Mount Isa, in north Queensland. As a result, Mount Isa has one of the largest Finnish communities in Australia.

At the end of the Second World War, around 20,000 Finns had moved to Australia. In the last three decades the Finnish immigration has dropped significantly.

In the mid-1950s an economic crisis occurs in Finland causing a new wave of Finnish immigration to Australia. One of the main reasons for leaving Finland, besides crisis, was Australia's reinvigorated assisted passage scheme.

== Statistics ==
The below table shows the number of residents in Australia that were Finnish-born or Australian-born with Finnish ancestry at different times.

Year	Finnish-born	Finnish ancestry
1921	1,358	
1954	1,733	
1961	6,488	
1971	10,359	
1991	9,110	
2011	7,939	22,420
2016	7,711	24,144
2021	7,831	27,811

== Notable people ==
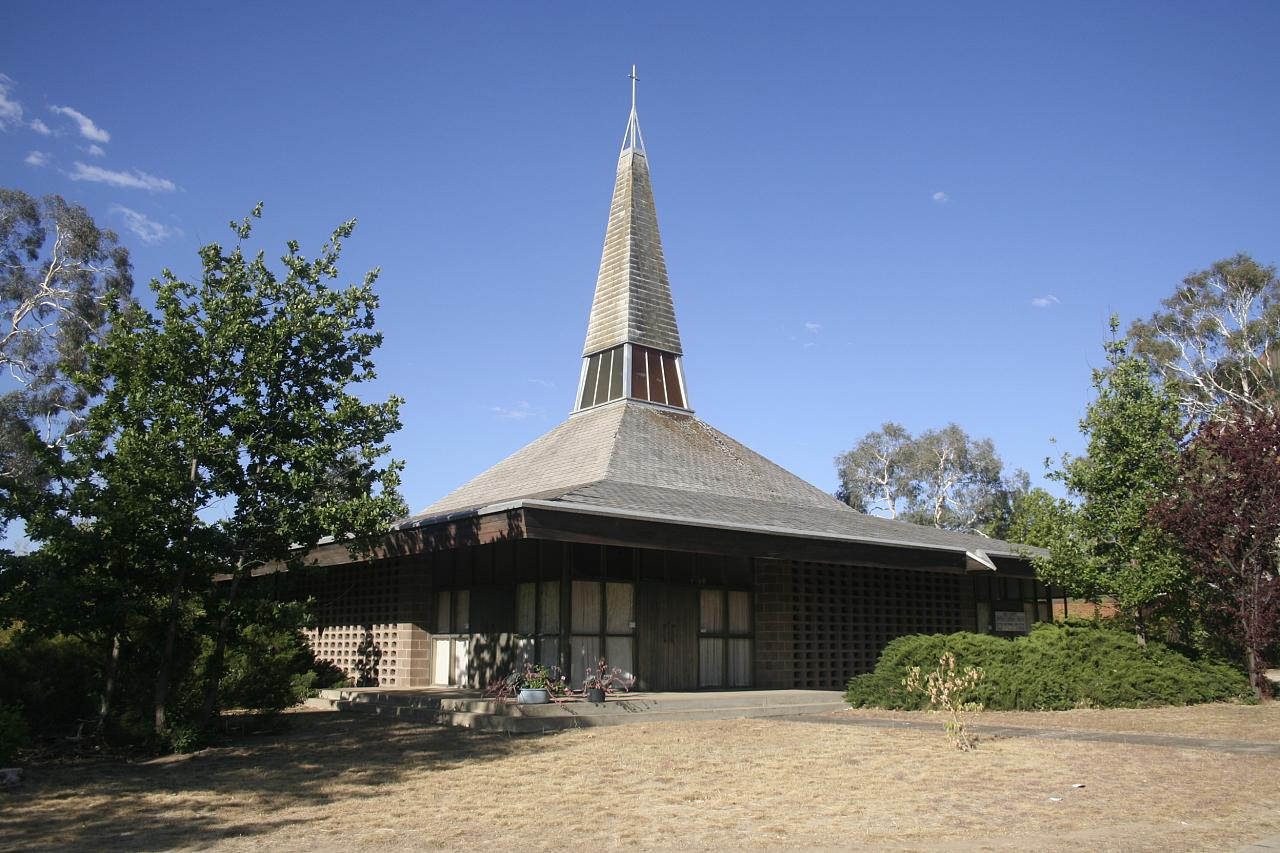
The Holy Trinity Finnish Lutheran Church in Canberra

- Matt Acton, goalkeeper
- Lucas Herrington, Australian footballer
- Carsten Haitzler, software engineer
- Greg Norman, professional golfer
- Connie Garner, bodybuilder, actor, fitness model and cybersecurity
- Sanna Jalomäki, singer, songwriter and painter
- Paul Sironen, rugby league player
- Satu Vänskä, violinist
- Shane Jacobson, actor, director, writer, and comedian
- David Michael, Western Australian politician

== See also ==
- Australia–Finland relations
- European Australians
- Europeans in Oceania
- Finnish diaspora
- Immigration to Australia
- Danish Australians
- Norwegian Australians
- Scandinavian Australians
- Swedish Australians
