= Kristi Tauti =

American bodybuilder

- Professional bodybuilder

Personal info
- Born: February 7, 1979 (age 47); Dayton, Oregon, U.S.

Best statistics
- Height: 5 ft 3 in (160 cm)
- Weight: (In Season) 104–108 lb (Off-Season) 118–120 lb

Professional (Pro) career
- Pro-debut: IFBB Pittsburgh Pro Figure; 2007
- Best win: 2006 NPOC Team Universe Champion (class B); 2006
- Predecessor: Jeanette Freed
- Successor: Tara Chandler
- Active: since 2001

Kristi Tauti (/ˈtaʊti/; born February 7, 1979) is a professional figure competitor, fitness model, and personal trainer from Oregon.

== Biography ==
Kristi Tauti was born and raised in Dayton, Oregon, the middle child of five daughters. Tauti grew up in a small town where her parents, according to Tauti, taught her the meaning of discipline, self-motivation, determination, and goal setting which she considers to be important qualities that have enabled her to accomplish her goals in life and in figure competition. At a young age she was involved with all sorts of sports and activities. In high school, she was involved in sports such as volleyball, basketball, softball, and track and field. Outside of sports she also played musical instruments such as the flute and piccolo in concert bands as well as the alto sax in jazz bands. Besides all this she also participated in many other activities and clubs at school.

After graduating from high school Tauti went to a junior college for two years in Idaho, and later moved on to Brigham Young University in Hawaii with her sister. Soon after graduating with a bachelor's degree in Exercise Sport Science, Tauti got an internship at Gold's Gym Honolulu. There she was approached by Debbie Bullman who suggested Tauti compete, Bullman became Tauti's personal trainer and trained her for her first competition: the 2001 Hawaiian Hurricane Fitness Challenge. Tauti won both rounds of the fitness challenge and took the overall title. After this victory, Tauti decided to continue a career in the fitness industry. During this time she married her Polynesian boyfriend Pati Tauti and settled in Oahu. She continued to compete in other fitness contests such as the 2002 NPC Mrs. Hawaiian Islands, 2003 Ms. Designer Body Hawaiian, and 2003 NPC Team Universe, placing well on all shows.

Kristi Tauti was planning to compete at the 2005 Team Universe, but changed her plans. After placing 4th at the 2003 NPC Team Universe, she moved from Hawaii to her hometown in Oregon, became a mother for the first time and now works at Hawthorn Farm Athletic Club & Powerhouse Gym as a personal trainer. A year after giving birth, Tauti returned to competition in 2006, entering the 2006 Emerald Cup and Oregon Ironman, where she placed second and first respectively qualifying for a pro card. Kristi Tauti is now training to compete at the Pittsburgh Pro, California Pro, Denver Pro, and Tournament of Champions, in the hopes of qualifying for the 2007 Miss Figure Olympia.

In 2008 Tauti formed Team i-Physique, a competitive women's figure/fitness team. The team has grown quickly based on its solid success in the 2008 and 2009 season. Recently Tauti won her first IFBB pro show in Sacramento California.

== Vital stats ==
- Place of Birth: Dayton, Oregon
- Current state of Residence: Dayton, Oregon
- Occupation: Figure competitor, fitness model, personal trainer
- Marital Status: Married to Pati Tauti, daughter Taliamalefiafia
- Height: 5'3" (160 cm)
- Weight (In Season): 104–108 lb (47–49 kg) (Off-Season):118–120 lb (54 kg)
- Eye Color: Light Brown
- Hair Color: Brown
- Bust: 34 inches (86 cm)
- Waist 24 inches (61 cm)
- Hips: 34 inches (86 cm)
- Size: 2-4 (U.S.)

== Competition history ==
- 2001 Ms. Hawaiian Hurricane; 1st (Short) and Overall
- 2002 Ms. Hawaiian Hurricane; 1st (Short) and Overall
- 2002 NPC Mrs. Hawaiian Islands; 1st (Short) and Overall
- 2003 Ms. Designer Body Hawaiian; 1st (Short) and Overall
- 2003 NPC Team Universe; 4th
- 2006 NPC Emerald Cup; 2nd
- 2006 NPC Emerald Cup; 2nd (Class A)
- 2006 NPC Oregon Ironman; 1st (Class A), and Overall
- 2006 NPC Team Universe; 1st (Class B), (qualified for Pro Card)
- 2007 IFBB Pittsburgh Pro Figure; 21st
- 2007 IFBB California Pro Figure Championships; 9th
- 2007 IFBB Colorado Pro/Am Classic Figure Contest; 11th
- 2007 IFBB Jan Tana Women's Figure; 9th
- 2007 IFBB Sacramento Pro Figure Grand Prix; 12th
- 2008 IFBB California Pro Figure; 3rd
- 2008 IFBB Jacksonville Pro Figure; 6th
- 2008 IFBB Miss Figure Olympia; 18th
- 2008 IFBB Sacramento Pro Figure Grand Prix; 6th
- 2009 IFBB California Pro Figure; 3rd
- 2009 IFBB Miss Figure Olympia; 14th
- 2009 IFBB Border States Pro Figure; 2nd
- 2009 IFBB Sacramento Pro; 1st
- 2010 IFBB Ms. International - 8th
