= Tracey Greenwood =

American fitness competitor

- Professional bodybuilder
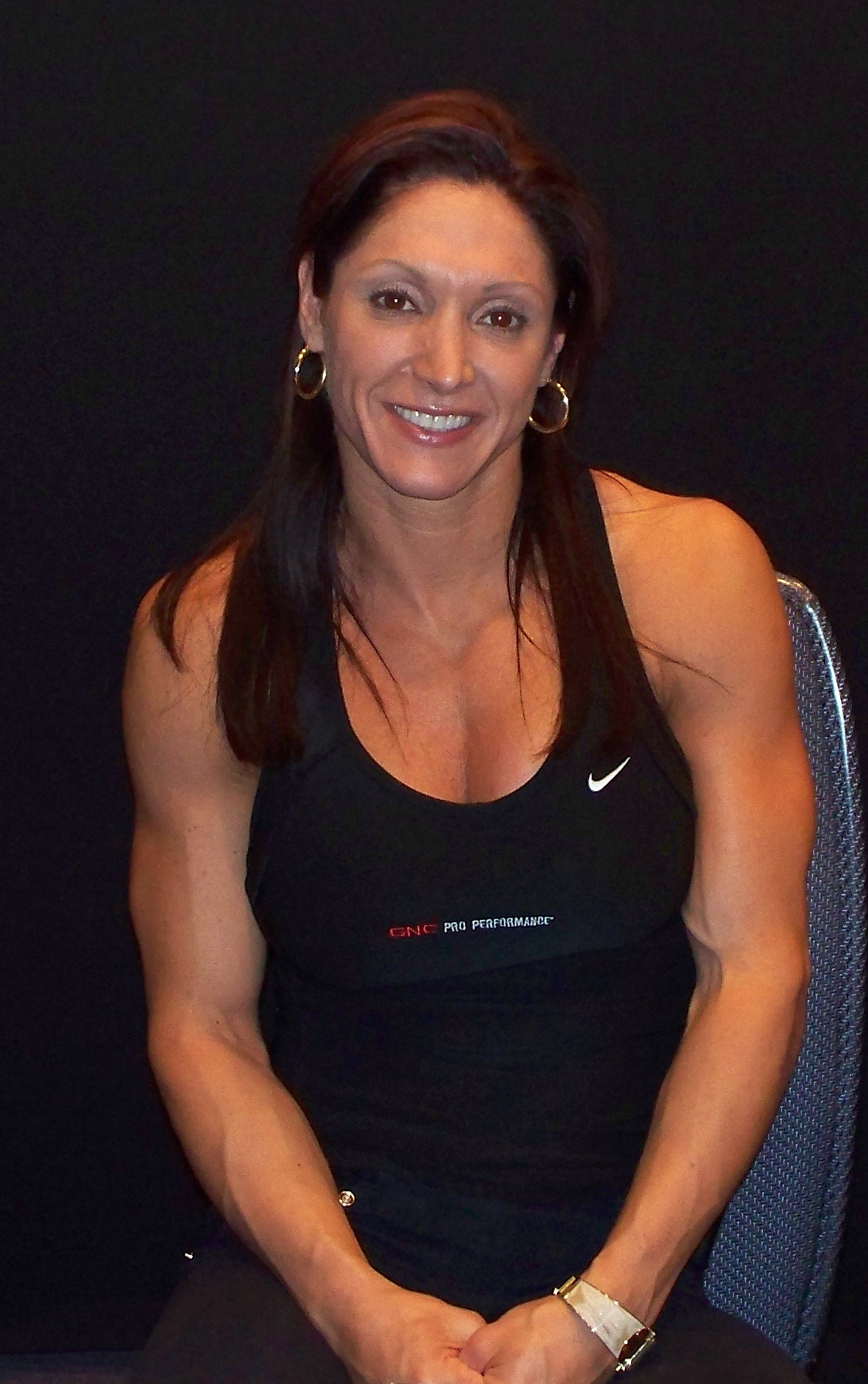
- Tracey Greenwood in 2008

Personal info
- Born: February 21, 1970 (age 56); New Jersey, United States

Best statistics

Professional (Pro) career
- Pro-debut: NPC USA Championships; 2001
- Best win: Stephanie Collins IFBB PRO Figure Champion
- Active: Since 1997

Tracey Greenwood is a professional fitness competitor on the IFBB circuit.

== Biography ==
Tracey became interested in fitness and bodybuilding during high school. Tracey would buy copies of Muscle & Fitness and would see pictures of early bodybuilders such as Cory Everson, Tonya Knight, and Rachel McLish. These early pioneers of female bodybuilding inspired Tracey and she decided to pursue her dream of becoming a fitness competitor. She started training in her senior year of high school, but didn't become serious until college. She won her first contest as an amateur in 1997 at the Europa Fitness Championships. Tracey continued competing as an amateur until 2001 when she took second place at the NPC USA Championships thus earning her Pro Card.

Aside from competing as an IFBB professional, Tracey also trains aspiring athletes for figure and fitness competition. She sponsors her own NPC contest (Tracey Greenwood Fitness and Figure Classic) and is a judge at the NPC state level. She earned a B.S. in exercise physiology from the University of Delaware in 1991 and a M.S. in health education from Saint Joseph's University in 1996. She possesses a Ph.D. in exercise physiology at Temple University. She also volunteers time for the animal rescue Adopt a Boxer Rescue.

== Contest history ==
- 1997 Pittsburgh NPC Fitness Championships – 4th
- 1997 Europa NPC Fitness Championships – 1st
- 1998 New Jersey Gold's Classic – 1st
- 1999 North American Championships – 3rd
- 2000 NPC USA Championships – 9th
- 2000 Team Universe Championships – 5th
- 2000 NPC Pittsburgh Amateur – Overall champion
- 2000 NPC National Championships – 4th
- 2001 NPC USA Championships – 2nd (earned Pro Card)
- 2002 IFBB Southwest Pro – 9th
- 2002 IFBB Atlantic States – 9th
- 2002 Carl van Vechten Fitness Championships – 19th
- 2002 Jan Tana Classic (now defunct) – 3rd
- 2002 Fitness Olympia – 7th
- 2003 Fitness International – 6th
- 2003 Night of Fitness – 5th
- 2003 Jan Tana Classic (now defunct) – 1st
- 2003 Fitness Olympia – 4th
- 2003 GNC Show of Strength – 6th
- 2004 Fitness Olympia 5th
- 2005 Europa Supershow Champion
- 2005 Fitness Olympia – 4th
- 2005 Bulk Nutrition – 2nd place
- 2006 Fitness Olympia – 5th
- 2007 Fitness International – 6th
- 2007 New York Pro – 1st
- 2007 Atlantic City Pro – 1st
- 2008 Europa Supershow Champion
