= Jen Cassetty =

American bodybuilder (born 1974)

Jen Cassetty (born in 1974 in Atlanta, Ga.) is a female fitness figure competitor formerly with the IFBB Fitness Organization and current personal trainer, sports model and fitness columnists.

== Biography ==
Cassetty became interested in fitness and bodybuilding during college. Cassetty studied nutrition and exercise physiology in college. In 2000, Cassetty entered the competitive body building industry and earned her Pro card with the IFBB organization.

Cassetty currently holds NSCA CSCS and ACSM EP certifications. She is an exercise physiologist in New York City, working with collegiate athletes and corporate clients.

== Current projects ==
Cassetty was recently signed with the Wilhelmina Modeling Agency in New York City in the summer of 2009. In addition to her fitness training and modeling, she is a columnist for the CVS Pharmacy publication ReInventing Beauty.

== Body Building Competition Ranking ==
2008 IFBB New York Pro Fitness: Pro Fitness (11th)

2007 IFBB Atlantic City Pro Fitness: Pro Fitness (16th)

2007 IFBB Europa Super Show Fitness: Pro Fitness (16th)

2007 IFBB New York Pro Fitness: Pro Fitness (16th)

2006 IFBB Atlantic City Pro Fitness: Pro Fitness (9th)

2006 IFBB Europa Super Show Fitness: Pro Fitness (18th)

2005 NPC National Fitness Fitness: Class C (1st)*

- IFBB Pro Card

2005 NPC Team Universe Fitness: Tall (4th)

2005 NPC Emerald Cup Fitness: Tall (3rd)

2004 NPC National Fitness Fitness: Tall (7th)

2004 NPC Junior Nationals Fitness: Tall (6th)

2004 NPC Pittsburgh Fitness: Tall (5th)

2003 NPC Midwestern States Fitness: Tall (1st) Figure: Tall (4th)

2003 NPC Indiana Fitness: Tall (1st) Figure: Tall (1st)
