= Krisztina Sereny =

Hungarian fitness competitor

- ♀ Professional bodybuilder

Personal info
- Born: 6 August 1976 (age 50); Budapest, Hungary

Best statistics
- Contest weight: 160–170 lb (73–77 kg)
- Height: 5 ft 10 in (1.78 m)
- Off-season weight: 170–180 lb (77–82 kg)

Professional (Pro) career
- Best win: NAC World Championship; 2007

Krisztina Sereny (born 6 August 1976) is a professional fitness competitor from Budapest, Hungary, but moved to Spain in 2007. Krisztina has appeared in various fitness magazines such as Robert Kennedy's Oxygen magazine. FLEX magazine, Monde du muscle magazine, CKM, FHM magazine etc. In 2003, she became the first IFBB pro to make the cover of Playboy worldwide.

== Contest history ==
- 1998 IFBB Hungarian Championship – 4th
- 1998 NABBA Hungarian Championship – 2nd
- 1998 IFBB Hungarian Cup – 1st
- 1999 IFBB Hungarian Championship – 2nd
- 1999 IFBB Austrian International Championship – 1st
- 1999 IFBB Burizer Cup 1st
- 2000 IFBB Slovakian International Championship – 3rd
- 2000 IFBB HPLBF. Burizer Cup – 3rd
- 2001 IFBB Pro Fitness European Cup – 8th
- 2003 WABBA European Championship – 6th
- 2003 WABBA World Championship – 7th
- 2004 WABBA European Championship – 1st
- 2006 NAC world championship 3rd
- 2006 WABBA world championship 3rd
- 2007 NAC World Championship – 1st
