= Rhonda Lee Quaresma =

Canadian bodybuilder

- Professional bodybuilder

Personal info
- Born: December 11, 1968; Kingston, Ontario, Canada
- Died: November 26, 2021 (aged 52); Kingston, Ontario, Canada

Best statistics
- Height: 5 ft 1 in (1.55 m)

Professional (Pro) career
- Pro-debut: Jan Tana; 1998
- Best win: Canada Nationals Champion Middleweight and overall; 1995

Rhonda Lee Quaresma was a Canadian professional female bodybuilder and International Federation of BodyBuilding & Fitness (IFBB) competitor.

== Early life and career ==
Rhonda Lee Quaresma was born in Kingston, Ontario, Canada. In an interview, she says post-puberty weight gain and the encouragement of her family, especially from her father, was what drove her initial interest in fitness. She lived in Toronto, Ontario, Canada and frequently visited Los Angeles, California as a professional bodybuilder and personal trainer.

Quaresma made her debut in the Kingston Open in 1989, placing first in the lightweight division. After a series of successful amateur competitions on the Canadian tier system, in 1995 Quaresma won the title of Miss Canada at the Canadian Nationals Level-4, placing first in the middleweight division and winning the overall title; the win also secured Quaresma as a professional bodybuilder, earning her IFBB Pro card after winning the Canadian Nationals through the Canadian Bodybuilding Federation (CBBF).

Quaresma's IFBB debut was the 1998 Jan Tana Classic, placing 13th out of 28 women, making the comparison rounds with the event's winner. She last competed at the 2016 IFBB Pro Ferrigno Legacy in the Women's Physique category.

She returned to physique-exhibition events and last competed at the 2016 IFBB Pro Ferrigno Legacy in the Women's Physique category. She then retired from bodybuilding competitions.

Quaresma was also a private trainer and nutrition tech certified by 'PROPTA: The professional personal trainers association.'

In 2011, Quaresma was arrested in a prostitution sting in Florida. Using the name "Miss Sparkle", she met with an undercover police officer posing as a client. She was released on bond.

== Illness and death ==
Quaresma died of colon cancer on November 26, 2021, after three years of illness. News of her death was confirmed on her Instagram account by a long time friend.

== Post-retirement ==
Quaresma retired from bodybuilding competition in 2016 for health reasons. She opened up about her cancer on her YouTube channel in 2020.

In 2018 she turned her love for art into a career along with still working as a personal trainer and active in bodybuilding.

== Bodybuilding competition history ==
- Kingston Open Level-1 1989 1st Place LW 101 lbs (amateur open).
- Ottawa Open Level-1 1990 1st Place LW 103 lbs (amateur open).
- Ontario Eastern Regional Level-2 1992 1st Place LW 105 lbs (amateur regional).
- All Ontario Level-3 1993 1st Place LW 110.5 lbs (amateur provincials).
- Canadian Nationals Level-4 1995 1st Place MW 121 lbs. (amateur nationals)
- Jan Tana Classic 1998 13th Place 128 lbs.(professional International)
- Night of Champions 2003 14th place (Pro International)
- Toronto Pro Show 2012 (pro physique) 13th place
- Titans Grand Prix (Pro Physique) 16th place
- Ferrigno Legacy 2016 16th place (Pro physique)
