= Fitness Gurls =

US magazine

- Editor: Jason Miller
- Categories: Fitness; Health; Lifestyle
- Frequency: Bi-monthly
- Company: Fitness Gurls, LLC
- Country: United States
- Based in: Las Vegas, Nevada
- Language: English
- Website: www.fitnessgurls.com

Fitness Gurls is a fitness based magazine. It covers fitness, health, nutrition and exercise routines.

The magazine is published bi-monthly in print and digitally. The magazine has been compared to a Maxim for Fitness.

== Cover Models ==
Their cover models are most often popular women in the world of sport, fitness and entertainment.

Their cover models have included Miesha Tate, Brittney Palmer, Felice Herrig, Audrina Patridge, Arianny Celeste and other UFC fighters.

Hope Beel, Paige Hathaway, Torrie Wilson, Chelsea Green and some other fitness models have also appeared on their cover.

== See also ==
- Men's Fitness
- Powerlifting USA
