= Satu Vänskä =

Finnish Australian violinist

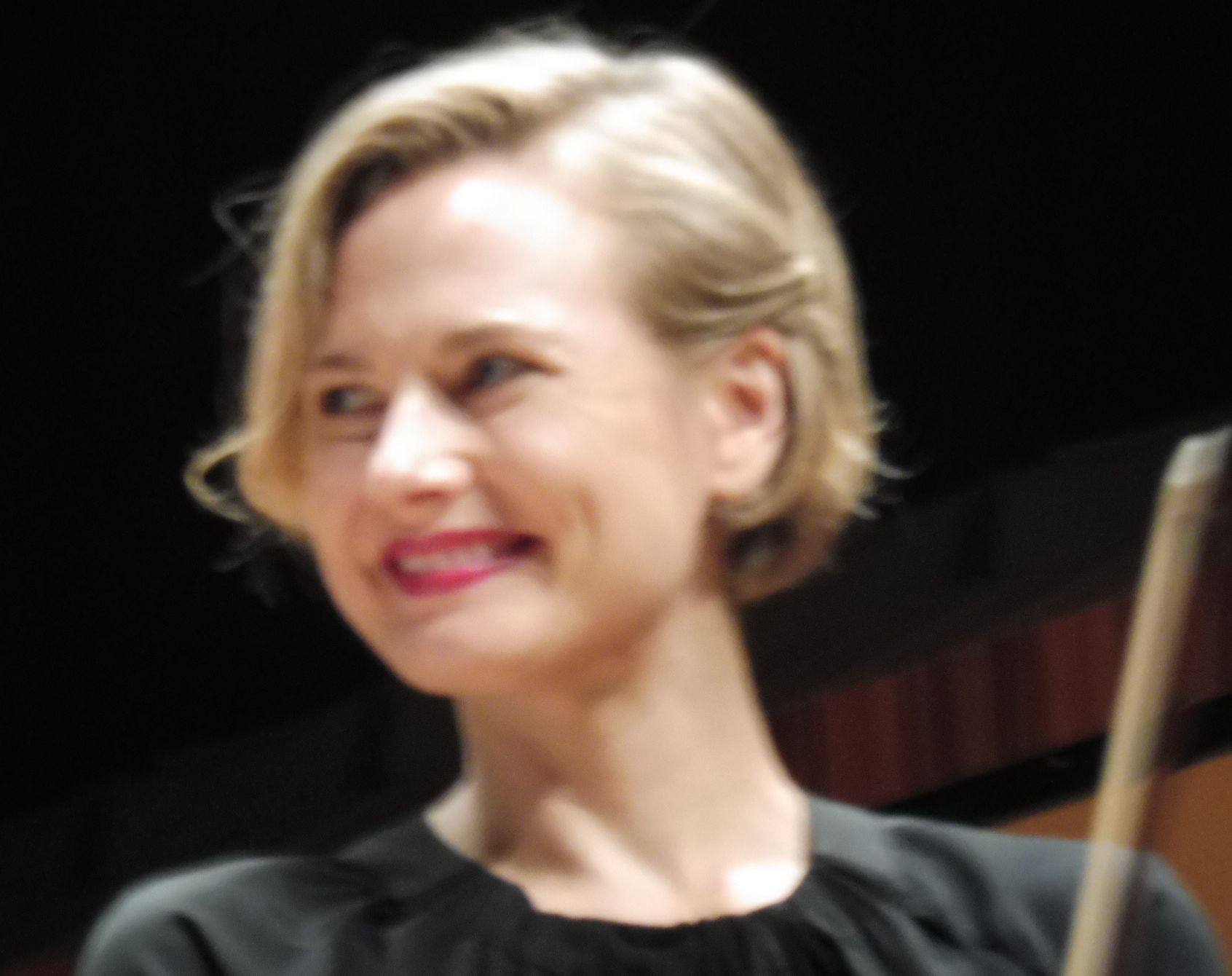
Satu Vänskä, 2018

Satu Vänskä (born 1979) is a Finnish Australian violinist.

== Early life ==
Vänskä was born to a Finnish family in the Kinki region of Japan, where she took her first violin lessons at the age of three. Her family moved back to Finland in 1989 and she continued her studies with Pertti Sutinen at the Lahti Conservatorium and the Sibelius Academy. At the age of 11 Vänskä was selected for the Kuhmo Violin School in Finland, a special institution for talented young violinists where she attended master classes with Ilya Grubert, Zinaida Gilels and Pavel Vernikov and had the opportunity to perform at the Kuhmo Chamber Music Festival with the Kuhmo Virtuosi Chamber Orchestra.

In her teens Vänskä studied violin at Hochschule für Musik in Munich, Germany. This led to her performances with the Munich Philharmonic, the Bavarian Radio Symphony Orchestra, at the Tuusulanjärvi Festival, and at Festivo Aschau. From 1997 Vänskä was a pupil of Ana Chumachenco at the Hochschule für Musik in Munich where she finished her diploma in 2001.

Vänskä has received high acclaim for her violin excellence, most notably the Young Soloist of the Year (1998) award by Sinfonia Lahti.

== Career ==
Vänskä is Principal Violin of the Australian Chamber Orchestra. She has performed as lead violin and soloist with the ACO and performs on the 1726 'Belgiorno' Stradivarius violin on loan from Guido and Michelle Belgiorno-Nettis.

Vänskä performed as orchestra leader and soloist in the 2018 London production of Barry Humphries’ Weimar Cabaret with the Aurora Orchestra at the Barbican Centre. She has appeared as soloist with the Tasmanian Symphony Orchestra and Arctic Chamber Orchestra and in recital at the Sydney Opera House and the Melbourne Recital Centre, opening their Great Performers Series in 2019.

== ACO Underground ==
Vänskä is the director, frontwoman, violinist and vocalist of the Australian Chamber Orchestra’s electronic spin-off band, ‘ACO Underground’. With ACO Underground, Vänska has performed collaborations with artists that include Midnight Oil's Jim Moginie, Violent Femmes’ Brian Ritchie, Jonny Greenwood, Meow Meow and producer Paul Beard in venues including New York's Le Poisson Rouge and Sydney's Oxford Art Factory, and at Slovenia's Maribor Festival.

In 2022, Vänska established ACO Underground: Satu in the Beyond.

== Personal life ==
Vänskä is married to violinist and artistic director of the Australian Chamber Orchestra, Richard Tognetti.
