= Jelena Abbou =

Serbian fitness competitor

Jelena Djordjevic
- Professional bodybuilder

Personal info
- Nickname: Jelena Abbou
- Born: April 2, 1977 (age 48); Gornji Milanovac, Serbia

Best statistics

Professional (Pro) career
- Pro-debut: 1996
- Best win: Ms. Buffalo Figure Championship Overall Champion; 2004

Jelena Abbou, née Jelena Đorđević, (born April 2, 1977) is a figure competitor model and personal trainer, born in Serbia and now living in the United States. She has also appeared in MAC advertisements.

Abbou grew up in Gornji Milanovac, Serbia.

== Contest history ==
- 2001 NPC Women's Extravaganza - 5th
- 2002 NPC East Coast Championship - 3rd
- 2002 INBA Fitness Model Quest - 3rd
- 2003 WNFB Worlds Natural Pro Figure - 5th
- 2003 INBF Natural Monster Mash - Overall winner
- 2004 WNBF Worlds Pro Natural Figure (New York City) - 1st
- 2004 Northeast Classic Pro Figure - 2nd (and Ms. Photogenic)
- 2004 Natural Atlantic Coast INBF Pro Figure - 1st
- 2005 Ms. Buffalo Figure Championship - Overall winner
- 2006 Junior Nationals, Class C, 8th Place
