= Malika Zitouni =

French bodybuilder

- Professional bodybuilder

Personal info
- Born: 12 December 1973 (age 52); Limoges, France

Best statistics
- Height: 5 ft 7 in (1.70 m)
- Weight: (Contest) 135 lb (Off-Season) 145 lb

Malika Zitouni is a French professional fitness athlete. She earned her WBFF Professional status by winning the Fitness Model Over 35 class at the WBFF World 2015 in Las Vegas.

Malika is an advocate for healthy lifestyles and nutrition. In September 2018, she opened La petite graine, a vegetarian restaurant in Limoges, France.

== Competitions ==
- Nabba Northern Ireland 2004: 2nd figure
- Nabba Britain 2004: 3rd figure class 1
- Nabba Universe 2004: 8th figure class 1
- Nabba UK 2004: 3rd figure
- Nabba Northern Ireland 2005: Winner figure Overall
- Nabba Britain 2005: 2nd figure 1
- NABBA Universe 2005: 6th figure class 1
- Nabba Northern Ireland 2006: Winner
- NABBA Britain 2006: 2nd figure class 1
- WPF Scotland 2006: Winner
- WPF European 2006: Overall Figure Winner
- Nabba World 2006: 3rd figure class 1
- Nabba Universe 2006: Winner Class 1
- Pro Am Caledonia 2007: Winner
- Nabba Britain 2007: Figure Overall Winner
- Nabba World 2007: Overall Figure Winner
- Nabba Universe 2007: Winner class 1
- NAC World 2008: Overall Figure Winner
- NAC Universe 2008: Winner class 1
- WBFF 2015 PRO FITNESS Diva Over 35
