= Jenny Lynn =

American figure competitor (died 2021)

Jenny Lynn (February 1971 – July 18, 2021) was an American International Federation of BodyBuilders (IFBB) professional figure competitor.

Lynn began weight-training after high school when she was an aerobics instructor and competitor. She was a fitness competitor who earned pro status at the 2001 USA Championships. Jenny Lynn competed in four professional fitness contests in 2002. She then crossed over to figure when the figure category was created in 2003. She won consecutive Figure Olympia titles in 2006 and 2007. She retired from competing following the 2009 Olympia competition.

Jenny Lynn-Powell died on July 18, 2021, from a seizure, aged 49.

== Contest history ==
- 2002 IFBB Arnold Classic And Internationals - 12th
- 2002 IFBB New York Pro Fitness - 5th
- 2002 IFBB Pittsburgh Pro Fitness - 7th
- 2002 IFBB GNC Show Of Strength - 5th
- 2003 IFBB Figure International - 1st
- 2003 IFBB Night of Champions, Figure - 2nd
- 2003 IFBB Figure Olympia - 3rd
- 2003 IFBB Pittsburgh Pro Figure, Figure - 1st
- 2003 IFBB Show of Strength Pro Championship, Figure - 1st
- 2004 IFBB Figure International - 1st
- 2004 IFBB Figure Olympia - 2nd
- 2004 IFBB Show of Strength Pro Championship, Figure - 1st
- 2005 IFBB Figure International - 1st
- 2005 IFBB Figure Olympia - 2nd
- 2005 IFBB Sacramento Pro Championships, Figure - 1st
- 2005 IFBB San Francisco Pro Championships, Figure - 1st
- 2006 IFBB Colorado Pro Championships, Figure - 2nd
- 2006 IFBB Pittsburgh Pro Figure, Figure - 1st
- 2006 IFBB Figure Olympia - 1st
- 2007 IFBB Figure Olympia - 1st
- 2008 IFBB Figure Olympia - 4th
- 2009 IFBB Jacksonville Pro - 3rd
- 2009 IFBB Europa - 1st
- 2009 IFBB Figure Olympia - 7th

== See also ==
- List of female fitness & figure competitors
