= Muscle & Fitness =

American fitness magazine

- Categories: Fitness; Bodybuilding
- Frequency: Monthly
- Total circulation: 320,399 (2014 estimate)
- Founder: Joe Weider
- Founded: 1935
- First issue: 1936
- Company: JW Media
- Country: United States
- Based in: Woodland Hills, California, U.S.
- Language: English
- Website: www.muscleandfitness.com
- ISSN: 0744-5105

Muscle & Fitness is an American fitness and bodybuilding magazine founded in 1935 by Canadian entrepreneur Joe Weider. It was originally published under the title Your Physique, before being renamed to Muscle Builder in 1954, and acquiring its current name in 1980. There is also a companion magazine called Muscle and Fitness Hers, oriented toward women.

== History ==
Muscle & Fitness has a more mainstream fitness and bodybuilding lifestyle focus than its companion publication, Flex, which mainly covers more specialised "hardcore" and professional bodybuilding topics. It offers many exercise and nutrition tips, while at the same time advertising a variety of nutritional supplements from companies.

Many professional bodybuilders are featured in each monthly issue of Muscle & Fitness, such as Gustavo Badell, Darrem Charles, Ronnie Coleman, and Jay Cutler. Figure competitors such as Monica Brant, Jenny Lynn, and Davana Medina are also featured, as are entertainers and other public figures such as Muhammad Ali, Steve Austin, John Cena, 50 Cent, Jean-Claude Van Damme, Todd Duffee, Triple H, Evander Holyfield, Dwayne Johnson, Brock Lesnar, Nate Marquardt, Stephanie McMahon, Vince McMahon, John Morrison, Mike O'Hearn, Maryse Ouellet, Arnold Schwarzenegger, and Joe Weider himself.

In its December 2015 issue, Muscle & Fitness named Dwayne Johnson its "Man of the Century", crediting him for being "emblematic" of the growth of the fitness industry. Johnson said in the issue, "During the lowest point of my life, this magazine was my rock."

M&F, along with Mr. Olympia, Flex, and Muscle & Fitness Hers was sold to Arizona-based female bodybuilding enthusiast Jake Wood in February 2020.
