= Fitness and figure competition =

Form of physique training

Fitness and figure competition is a class of physique-exhibition events mainly for women but also men. While bearing a close resemblance to bodybuilding, its emphasis is on muscle definition, not size. The class was introduced when bodybuilding's popularity began to decline.

== Overview ==
Fitness and Figure are distinct forms of competition. In the older Fitness discipline, female competitors showcase their physiques (which are less massive than bodybuilders') while performing a demanding, time-limited, aerobic/dance routine. In a Figure contest the most important attributes are a curvaceous-yet-trim body and facial beauty. The guidelines are similar and many contestants move back and forth between the two disciplines. The Figure division emerged when the numbers for Fitness pageant competitions started to dwindle. Typically, Fitness and Figure competitions are held in conjunction with bodybuilding contests.

== History ==
Body building has traditionally been seen as a male-appropriate activity, and beauty pageants were the main way for women to compete. Various authors have documented the struggle faced by pioneering women body builders as they entered the competitive body building world in the 1970s. Gold's Gym is said to have prided itself on being ‘ovary free’ until the late 1970s. Women's fitness competitions started in the 1980s, and have shown a significant increase in popularity since.

Wally Boyko produced the first women's Fitness competition in 1985, at the National Fitness trade show in Las Vegas, Nevada; it included a swimsuit round, an athletic routine, and an evening gown segment. Louis Zwick, then the producer of American Muscle Magazine (a bodybuilding TV show on ESPN), aired a segment on the pageant, and in 1989 launched Fitness America (now Fitness Universe). The International Federation of BodyBuilding & Fitness held its own, sanctioned fitness pageant—Fitness Olympia—in 1995.

In 2001, the National Physique Committee (the major sanctioning body for bodybuilders) held the first women's Figure competition: the Figure Nationals at Borough of Manhattan Community College's Performing Arts Center in New York City. It was a qualifier for, and precursor to, the 2003 International Federation of BodyBuilding & Fitness Figure Olympia in Las Vegas, Nevada. The Fitness Universe organization launched their own Figure division in 2005.

== Categories ==
=== Fitness competition ===
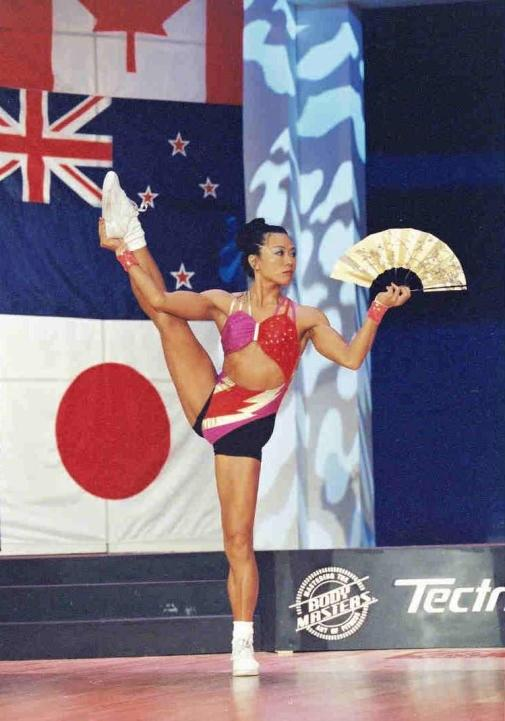
A fitness competitor during her show

A typical fitness competition consists of a swimsuit round and a routine round. In the swimsuit round, the competitors wear two-piece swimsuits and high-heeled shoes, presenting their physiques with a series of quarter- or half-turns toward the judges and audience. Physique guidelines for fitness competitions typically suggest a small amount of muscular mass; clear separations between muscle groups (but, no visible striations); and, leanness. The swimsuit must cover at least fifty percent of the gluteus maximus muscle; no thongs or G-strings are allowed. The routine round requires a physically active stage performance; most competitors attempt aerobic, dance, and/or gymnastic routines.

Fitness contests sanctioned by the International Federation of BodyBuilding & Fitness (IFBB) are the Fitness Olympia and the Fitness International. Fitness contests sanctioned by Wally Boyko Productions are the National Fitness Sanctioning Body (NFSB) Ms. Fitness USA and the International Fitness Sanctioning Body (IFSB) Ms. Fitness World. Fitness contests sanctioned by the Fitness Universe organization are the Fitness America Pageant and the Fitness Universe Pageant.

=== Figure competition ===
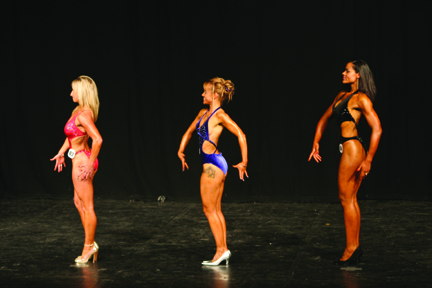
During figure competition show

Figure competition is a newer sub-category of fitness contests. Figure shows exclude the routine round common to fitness shows. The competitors are judged solely on muscular symmetry and definition; as in fitness shows, muscle size is downplayed. Figure competitions appeal most to women who want to compete in a body competition, but wish to avoid fitness shows' additional athletic and creative demands (the routine round), or bodybuilding's demands for heavy muscle mass.

A typical figure competition includes two rounds, though this varies by organization. In the symmetry round, the competitors appear on stage in high-heeled shoes and a one-piece swimsuit in a side-by-side line that faces the judges. They execute a series of quarter-turns to the right, allowing the judges to view and compare them from all sides for symmetry, presentation, and other aesthetic qualities such as skin tone, hair, make-up, and stylishness of clothing. In the next round (the group comparisons), competitors return in high heels and a two-piece bathing suit, executing a series of quarter-turns. At this stage, they are judged more critically against the others for conditioning, leanness, and how "feminine" and "athletic" (as opposed to brawny) their muscularity is. Included in either of these rounds, or perhaps just the evening show, the competitors come out individually on stage for a model walk where they are judged on presentation, gracefulness, confidence, poise, and professionalism.

Figure contests sanctioned by the International Federation of BodyBuilding & Fitness (IFBB) are the Figure Olympia and the Figure International. Figure contests sanctioned by the Fitness Universe organization is the Figure Universe Pageant.

=== Bikini competition ===
Bikini competition was created as a category with much less emphasis on muscularity to accommodate even more women into the world of physique competitions and IFBB recognized bikini competition as an independent competition category on 7 November 2010. Rapidly growing, bikini category looks for lean and firm physique and "competitors are scored on proportion, symmetry, balance, shape and skin tone". Women that are not willing to be as muscular as bodybuilders can still participate in bikini competition. The tan that they have is also a point that should be taken into consideration when it comes to participating at a bikini competition. The first Bikini Olympia was introduced in 2010, since then it has grown to become the largest and most popular division on the fitness stage.

=== Physique competition ===
Women's physique category has been created to give a platform for women who enjoy weight training, competing, and contest preparation. Competitors should display a toned, athletic physique showcasing femininity, muscle tone, and beauty/flow of physique. The following are examples of common terms used in the bodybuilding industry. These words can be helpful to assess what should not be descriptive to the physiques being judged in women's physique: ripped, shredded, peeled, striated, dry, diced, hard, vascular, grainy, massive, thick, and dense. While all types of physiques will be considered when it comes to height, weight, structure, etc. Excessive muscularity should be scored down accordingly. Women's physique competitors should have the overall aesthetics and look that is found in figure with a little more overall muscularity. Women's physique categories are broken down into two parts, a group comparison and an individual performance routine. During group comparisons competitors will be directed through a series of poses that can consist of any of the following: quarter turns, front or rear double biceps with open hands, left or right-side chest with front leg and arms extended, left or right-side triceps with front leg extended, hands over head abdominals. In the individual performance routine contestants perform a small choreographed routine to music. Not only do they have to look good on stage they have to show their personality on stage depending on the physique competition some will require you to wear a one-piece bikini or a two-piece bikini. Some competitions depending on the organization for instance NPC or IFBB will require the use of high heels or bare feet. Along with the use of jewelry or no jewelry, physique competitors also have to worry about their tan, makeup and hair.

== See also ==
- Fitness Gurls
- Fitness model
- List of female fitness & figure competitors
